= Altira Macau =

Casino resort in Cotai, Macau

- 新濠鋒酒店 (Yue Chinese)
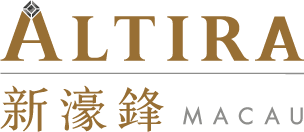

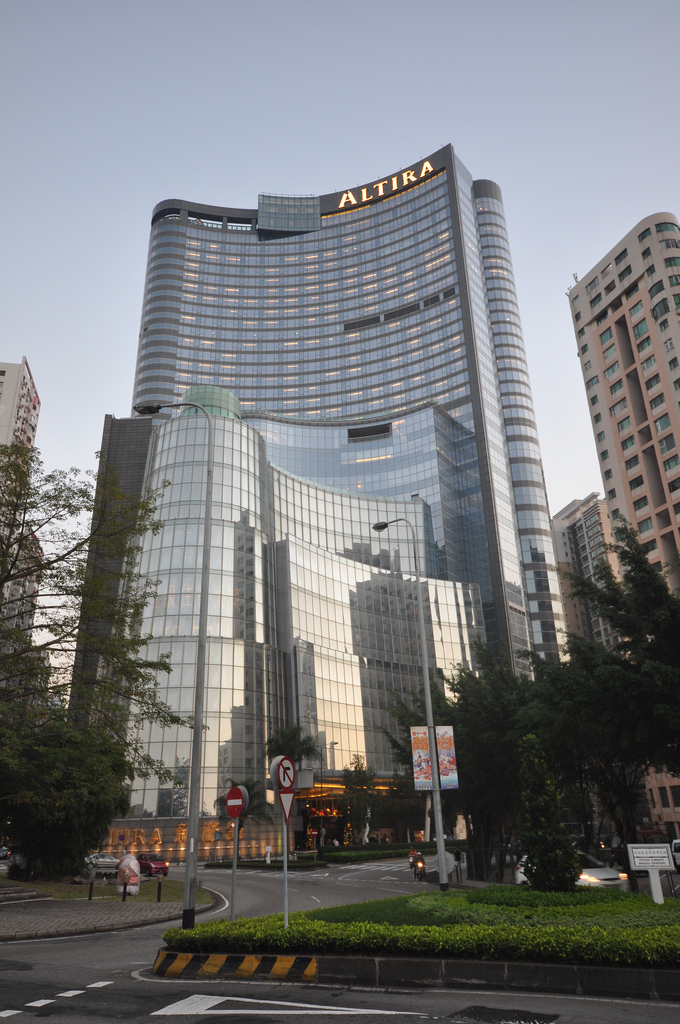

- Location within Macau
- Interactive map of Altira Macau
- Location: Taipa, Macau; Altira Macau, Avenida de Kwong Tung; 22°9′42.2532″N 113°33′17.924″E
- Opened: 12 May 2007; 19 years ago
- No. of rooms: 216
- Notable restaurants: Ying Chinese Restaurant Tenmasa Japanese Restaurant; Aurora Italian Restaurant; Yi Pavilion; Monsoon; Herbal Treasures; Qi Long 38 Lounge
- Casino type: Land
- Owner: Melco Resorts & Entertainment
- Architect: Wong Tung & Partners
- Previous names: Crown Macau
- Website: altiramacau.com

Altira Macau (Chinese: 新濠鋒酒店, formerly known as Crown Macau), is an integrated resort and casino in Taipa, Macau. The hotel complex has 216 guest rooms and a spa. Altira Macau is the tallest building in Taipa and among the tallest 20 buildings in Macau.

== History ==
The integrated resort was built and initially operated by Melco Crown Entertainment, a joint venture by Hong Kong–based Melco International Development Limited and Australian based Crown Limited. It opened as Crown Macau on May 12, 2007. It was renamed Altira Macau on April 27, 2009, prior to the June opening of the Crown Towers Macau by Melco. Catering to clientele from Asia, management of Altira Macau operated as a partnership until May 2017, when Melco International acquired a $1.16 billion controlling interest in Crown Resorts. Melco Crown Entertainment was then renamed Melco Resorts & Entertainment. The resort closed for 15 days in February 2020 due to the coronavirus pandemic.

== Facilities ==
The 160-meter Altira Macau is Taipa's tallest building. A 38 floor complex of 183,000 sq. feet, it has 216 guest rooms including suites and villas with interiors designed by Peter Remédios. The casino has 220 gaming tables and 550 slot machines. Hotel features include The Spa At Altira Macau, an indoor infinity pool, a fitness center, and a business center.

Restaurants and bars include the restaurant Ying specializing in Cantonese cuisine, the Japanese restaurant Tenmasa, the Italian restaurant Aurora, Yi Pavilion, Monsoon, Mocha Cafe, the classical Chinese restaurant Qi Long, and the 38 Lounge.

== See also ==
- List of Macau casinos
- List of tourist attractions in Macau
- List of tallest buildings in Macau
- Macau gaming law
- Gambling in Macau
- List of integrated resorts
