= Melco Resorts & Entertainment =

Integrated resorts company based in Hong Kong

Melco Resorts & Entertainment Limited
- Type: Public
- Traded as: Nasdaq: MLCO
- Industry: Hospitality, Tourism
- Genre: Casino, Entertainment, Hotels
- Founder: Lawrence Ho
- Headquarters: Hong Kong
- Area served: 6 (Hong Kong, Macau, Japan, Cyprus, Philippines, Sri Lanka)
- Key people: Lawrence Ho Yau Lung (Chairman & CEO)
- Revenue: $5.7 billion USD (2019)
- Operating income: $747 million USD (2019)
- Net income: $394 million USD (2019)
- Owner: Melco International
- Number of employees: 21,000
- Parent: Melco
- Website: melco-resorts.com

Melco Resorts & Entertainment Limited is a developer, owner and operator of integrated resorts with entertainment and casino gaming facilities in Asia and Europe. Based in Hong Kong, the company is listed on the NASDAQ. Originally known as Melco Crown Entertainment (Melco Crown or MPEL), Melco Resorts was founded in 2004 as a joint venture between Melco International and Crown Limited. Melco Crown became Melco Resorts & Entertainment in May 2017 and currently operates as a subsidiary of Melco International. Melco Resorts owns a number of integrated casino resorts, having launched Altira Macau in 2007, City of Dreams Macau in 2009, City of Dreams Manila in 2015, Studio City Macau in 2015, City of Dreams Mediterranean in 2021, the largest casino-resort in Europe and City of Dreams Sri Lanka in 2024. It also operates the Mocha Clubs slot machine brand.

== History ==
=== Founding as Melco Crown Entertainment (2004-2015) ===
In 2004, Melco International Development Limited partnered with James Packer's Australian casino company Crown Limited, creating the joint venture Melco Crown Entertainment Limited to invest in gaming ventures in Macau. Melco International's chief executive, Lawrence Ho, was appointed CEO and executive director of Melco Crown Entertainment in December 2004, with both Ho and Packer appointed co-chairmen. In March 2006, Melco Crown spent US$900 million to purchase the last of Macau's six gaming licenses from Wynn Resorts. The license allowed Melco Crown to "operate an unlimited number of casinos, tables and machines in Macau until June 2022," and the company began developing its first casino. Melco Crown listed on the NASDAQ in December 2006 and launched Altira Macau in July 2007, which was built for $1.45 billion.

Crown Limited's interest in Melco Crown was around 36% by June 2009, and in that year Melco Crown opened its flagship $2.4 billion casino resort City of Dreams Macau in Cotai. Melco Crown listed its shares on the Hong Kong Stock Exchange at the end of 2011. Also in 2011, Melco Crown acquired a 60% interest in Studio City Macau, a large-scale integrated resort project in Cotai. Designed with a Hollywood theme, the casino resort opened in October 2015 with a cost $3.2 billion. In its first project outside of Macau, in 2012 Melco Crown began partnering with SM Investments on the $1 billion casino resort City of Dreams Manila in the Philippines, in which Melco Crown was expected to invest up to $580 million. The casino resort opened in 2015.

=== Melco Resorts & Entertainment (2016-present) ===
Melco International became the majority shareholder of Melco Crown in May 2016. Crown Limited subsequently "suffered debts from ill-timed investments," according to the South China Morning Post, giving Melco International "the chance to buy up Packer’s shares." After developing four integrated resorts together, Melco International ended its partnership with Crown Resorts in May 2017 and purchased stake in Crown for $1.16 billion, with Melco Crown rebranded as Melco Resorts & Entertainment. Ho officially became COO, CEO, and chairman of Melco Resorts in April 2017, overseeing three resorts in Macau, eight Mocha Clubs, the resort in the Philippines, and the development in Cyprus. Melco's Mocha Clubs, opened in 2003 by Melco International in Macau, earlier had helped introduce "cafe-style slot-machine parlors" to Macau.

Melco Resorts announced in December 2017 that its Crown Towers hotels at City of Dreams in Macau and Manila would be rebranded as Nüwa. In June 2018, Melco Resorts & Entertainment opened Morpheus, a $1.1 billion hotel tower designed by Zaha Hadid for City of Dreams Macau. In July 2018, Melco Resorts opened the first esports stadium in Macau at Studio City. In the same year, Melco Resorts also won a license to build the largest casino-resort in Europe, securing a 30-year license for an integrated resort in Limassol, Cyprus with 15 years of exclusivity. Melco Resorts purchased a controlling stake in the Cyprus project in June 2019. Also that year, Melco Resorts announced that it was purchasing a stake in Crown Resorts from James Packer, with further stake increases to take place as it received regulatory approval. Melco Resorts sold the entirety of its stake in Crown Resorts to Blackstone Group Inc. in May 2020.

After new legislation legalized casinos in Japan in 2018, three integrated resort licenses were made available to bidders. new legislation legalized casinos in Japan in 2018, Melco Resorts submitted preliminary documents to the Osaka government to bid there for an integrated resort and announced it would be willing to invest as much as $10 billion in such a project. Describing project features such as an esports stadium, Melco Resorts also asserted that the project would bring tens of thousands of foreign workers to Japan. In August 2019, Yokohama became the second Japanese city besides Osaka to begin accepting bids, announcing its candidate site as Yamashita Pier. Adopting a "Yokohama-First" policy and stating that the location had become their "main focus," Melco Resorts dropped its bid in Osaka in September 2019 and began pitching "the world's biggest integrated resort" in Yokohama. Also in September 2019, Melco Resorts began constructing an office in Yokohama.

In August 2019, Melco Resorts became the official sponsor of Manchester City in Japan, while also sponsoring its sister club Yokohama F. Marinos. Melco Resorts announced that it has appointed tennis player Naomi Osaka to serve as its brand ambassador in October 2019, and that she was also director of sports for Melco's Japanese resorts. On October 29, Melco Resorts announced that it has invested $248 million in a fund to back hospitality projects in Japan. Independent of the integrated resort bid in Yokohama, The Melco Creative Exchange Fund was created specifically for non-gaming hotel projects.

During the COVID‑19 pandemic, Melco launched its “Simple Acts of Kindness” program, under which employees volunteered during work hours to support more than 1,600 community organizations. The Company also donated HKD 20 million (approximately USD 2.6 million) to assist Wuhan and Hubei in procuring medical supplies. The initiative received the Community Award – Asia at the 2020 Industry Community Awards.

In 2021, amid continued travel restrictions, Melco adjusted its operations while further developing its environmental, social and governance (ESG) framework. The company strengthened its group‑wide responsible gaming initiatives, with its Macau properties becoming the first in the market to obtain international third‑party responsible gaming accreditation – RG Check.

In 2022, Melco was granted a new 10-year gaming concession in Macau, effective January 1, 2023. The Company announced a long‑term investment commitment of MOP 11.82 billion in Macau over the following decade, including MOP 10 billion allocated to non‑gaming developments and initiatives aimed at attracting overseas visitors.

In 2023, Melco opened Studio City Phase 2 in Macau, a US1.2 billion expansion designed by Zaha Hadid Architects. The predominantly non‑gaming development includes two hotels — Epic Tower and W Macau Studio City — a 26,000‑square‑metre indoor water park, and facilities for meetings, incentives, conferences and exhibitions (MICE).

During the same year, Melco launched its Residency Concert Series, featuring Asian artists including Aaron Kwok, Joey Yung, and Leon Lai. The Company also expanded into Europe with the opening of City of Dreams Mediterranean in Limassol, Cyprus. The development, costing over US$660 million, marked Melco’s entry into the European market and was described as Europe’s first and largest integrated resort.

In 2024, Melco expanded its non‑gaming entertainment offerings in Macau with the opening of Studio City Cinema, featuring the first Dolby Cinema in Macau and Hong Kong. In subsequent years, the “Simple Acts of Kindness” initiative continued to receive industry recognition, including Best CSR Initiative at the IAG Academy Awards in 2024 and 2025.

In May 2025, the aquatic show, 'House of Dancing Water' returned to City of Dreams Macau. Originally premiered in 2010, the show has been hailed as a groundbreaking achievement in live entertainment. With a production budget exceeding RMB 2 billion, the show has staged nearly 4,000 performances, attracting audiences from all over the globe. In the same year, Melco also opened iRad Hospital with medical facility equipped with MRI and CT scan equipment in Studio City, as part of efforts to support Macau’s economic diversification.

Melco further expanded in South Asia with the opening of City of Dreams Sri Lanka in Colombo, a US$1.2 billion integrated resort developed in partnership with John Keells Holdings. As the largest integrated resort in Sri Lanka, the property includes two hotels with 800 rooms, retail outlets, and conference and exhibition facilities. Melco operates the gaming faciality under a 20 year licence and manages the Nüwa hotel.

== Properties ==
- Studio City Macau (60% ownership)
- City of Dreams
- City of Dreams Manila
- Altira Macau
- Morpheus Macau
- City of Dreams Mediterranean
- Mocha Clubs
- City of Dreams Sri Lanka

== See also ==
- List of integrated resorts
- List of casino hotels
