= Hann Resorts =

Casino hotel in Pampanga, Philippines

- Casino building with Swissôtel Clark in the background. May 2024

- Location in Luzon Location in the Philippines
- Interactive map of Hann Resorts
- Location: Clark Freeport Zone, Angeles City, Pampanga, Philippines; 15°11′27″N 120°31′29″E
- Opened: 2008 (as Widus Hotel); 2009 (start of casino operations)
- Casino type: Integrated resort
- Owner: Hann Philippines
- Operating license holder: PAGCOR
- Previous names: Widus Hotel and Casino
- Website: www.hannresorts.com

Hann Resorts (stylized as HANN), or Hann Casino Resort, is an integrated resort at the Clark Freeport Zone in Angeles City, Pampanga, Philippines.

== History ==
Hann Resorts is operated and owned by Hann Philippines, a company linked to South Korean businessman Dae Sik Han. Han would start developing the casino-hotel complex as early as 2006 with no connections to Filipinos.

The development of the Hann Resorts began with the opening of the Widus Hotel in 2008. The hotel initially suffered low occupancy rates during the 2008 financial crisis until the owners were granted a license to operate a casino in 2009.

The complex would expand with the opening of the 260-room Clark Marriott Hotel in 2018.

The complex would then be re-inaugurated under its current name "Hann Casino Resort" in December 15, 2021.

Another hotel, the Swissôtel Clark would open within the integrated resort in 2022.

== See also ==
- List of integrated resorts
