= Zakaki =

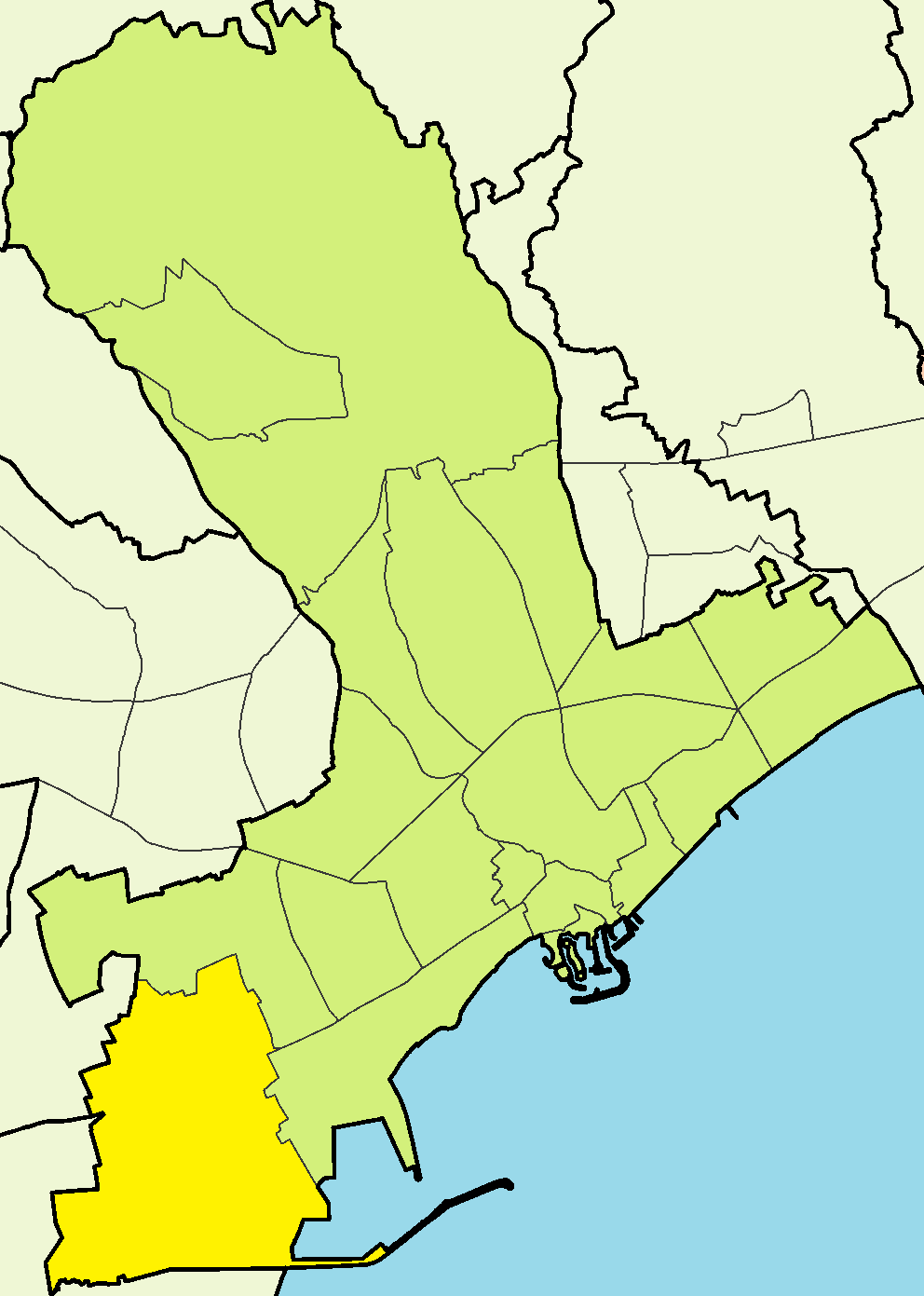
Zakaki quarter in Limassol

Zakaki is a suburb of Limassol, Cyprus, known for its significant developments and strategic location. In recent years, Zakaki has seen substantial growth and transformation, becoming a prominent area for business and leisure.

== City of Dreams Mediterranean ==
In June 2023, the City of Dreams Mediterranean luxury integrated resort and casino complex opened in Zakaki. This development, which spans 14.8 acres, is Europe's first and largest integrated resort. It features 500 rooms, a 7,500 square meter gaming space, and numerous high-end restaurants. The project, developed by Melco Resorts & Entertainment Limited, represents an investment of over €600 million and has significantly boosted the local economy and tourism.

== Economy and Development ==
The presence of the City of Dreams Mediterranean has accelerated the economic development of Zakaki, attracting both local and international investors. The area is also home to various businesses and residential projects, contributing to its growth as a key urban center in Limassol.

== Transportation ==
Zakaki is well-connected to the rest of Limassol and Cyprus through a network of roads and public transportation options, facilitating easy access for both residents and visitors.

== Points of Interest ==
In addition to the City of Dreams Mediterranean, Zakaki boasts several shopping centers, parks, and recreational facilities, making it an attractive destination for families and tourists alike.

== Future Prospects ==
With ongoing developments and increasing investments, Zakaki is poised for continued growth and transformation, further solidifying its position as a significant suburb of Limassol.
