= City of Dreams Sri Lanka =

- Hotel chain: Melco Resorts & Entertainment

General information
- Location: Colombo, Sri Lanka
- Coordinates: 6°55′30.51″N 79°50′51.73″E
- Opened: 2 August 2025; 14 months ago
- Cost: US$1.2 billion
- Owner: Melco Resorts & Entertainment

Height
- Height: 153 metres (502 ft)

Technical details
- Floor count: 47

Design and construction
- Architect: Cecil Balmond
- Main contractor: Hyundai Engineering and Construction

Other information
- Number of rooms: 800
- Number of restaurants: 14

Website
- cityofdreamssrilanka.com

City of Dreams Sri Lanka, formerly branded as Cinnamon Life Integrated Resort, is an integrated resort in Colombo, Sri Lanka. It is the first integrated resort in Sri Lanka and the largest private investment in the country. Designed by Sri Lankan-British architect Cecil Balmond with Hyundai Engineering and Construction as the main contractor, the resort was opened to the public on 2 August 2025.

Construction of the resort began in 2014, and all buildings in the resort were topped off by May 2019. Although the resort was originally planned to be completed by 2018, the project was delayed several times due to various reasons. John Keells Holdings began handing over keys to the suites apartments in August 2021. With the handing over of residential and commercial units, revenue recognition started at Cinnamon Life. In April 2024, John Keells Holdings announced an agreement with Melco Resorts & Entertainment to operate the gaming facility of the development initially known as Cinnamon Life. The project was subsequently rebranded as City of Dreams Sri Lanka, marking its evolution into a fully integrated resort in partnership with Melco. With this transformation, the development expanded to include Nuwa Hotel, featuring 113 rooms, alongside the 687-room Cinnamon Life hotel, bringing the total inventory to over 800 rooms. Together, the integrated resort now comprises two hotels, a casino, fine dining experiences, entertainment offerings, retail outlets, wellness facilities, and event spaces, all within a single destination.

== History ==
=== Construction ===
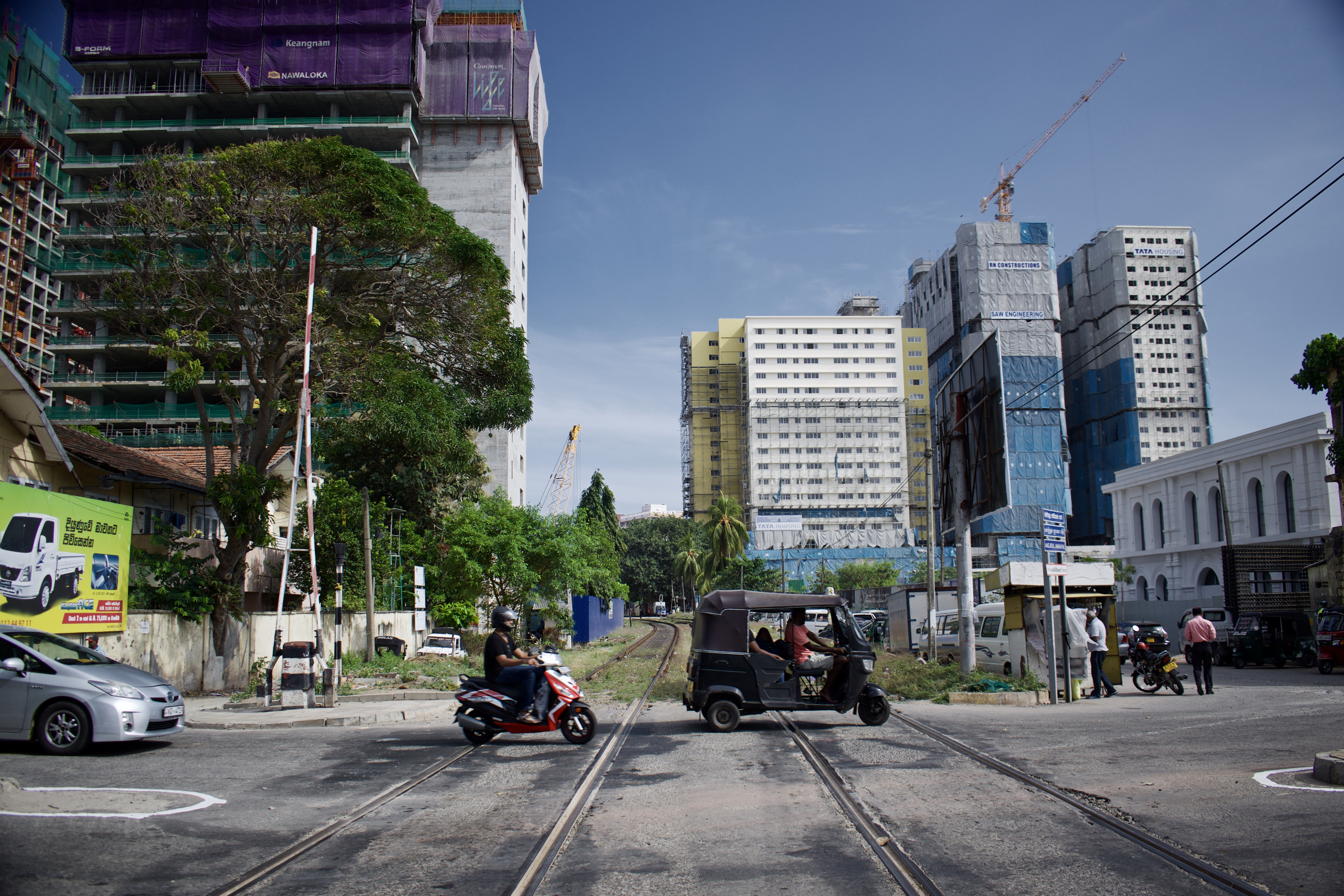
Cinnamon Life construction site (left) in September 2018

Construction of Cinnamon Life began in 2014, with Cecil Balmond as the main architect of the project and Hyundai Engineering & Construction as the main contractor. Waterfront Properties (Pvt) Ltd, a subsidiary of John Keells Holdings, managed the property which covered 4.5 million square feet (0.42×10^{6} m^{2}) total floor area. Over 50% of the floor area of the first residential tower was already sold by September 2016. In December 2018, the 'Suites Tower' was topped off.

65% of the residential tower's floor area including six penthouses out of 25 were presold by March 2019. A quarter of buyers were expatriates while 7%-8% were foreign investors, with an apartment having a starting price of US$400,000. All buildings including the Cinnamon Life Integrated Resort were topped off in May 2019. The project was scheduled to finish in 2018 but was eventually postponed, with completion of the Office Tower being postponed to March 2020, and the first quarter of 2023 for the hotel and retail mall. The cost of the project had also risen due to the depreciation of the Sri Lankan rupee against the US dollar. The revenue expected from the residential apartment and commercial office space would be US$250 million. Construction was paused in March 2020 due to the outbreak of the COVID-19 pandemic but resumed in May 2020 while keeping up with health guidelines imposed by health authorities. Prime minister Mahinda Rajapaksa paid a brief impromptu visit to the site in October 2020.

In December 2020, Daily Mirror reported that Cinnamon Life Integrated Resort may get licences from the government to operate casinos within the resort. On the dawn of the new year, the resort's residential tower lightened up to read "2021 Hope". In February 2021, the resort's office and suites towers received the certificate of conformity and were scheduled to be handed over to occupants in March 2021. John Keells Properties began handing over the keys to the suites apartments in August 2021. The apartment tower consisted of 196 units with two-four bedrooms. Revenue recognition at Cinnamon Life commenced after the handing over of residential and commercial units.

=== Inauguration ===
On 30 April 2024, John Keells Holdings announced that the company would be partnering with Melco Resorts & Entertainment of Hong Kong to operate the gaming facility of Cinnamon Life under a Melco's subsidiary. Melco will invest US$125 million to furnish the gaming space. As part of the agreement, the resort will be rebranded as City of Dreams Sri Lanka. Cinnamon Life at City of Dreams Sri Lanka was declared on 15 October 2024. On 2 August 2025, the resort was inaugurated and opened to the public. Melco is hoping to attract tourists and gamblers from neighboring India with the City of Dreams Sri Lanka.

== Resort ==
The US$1.2 billion investment used to build the resort was the largest private investment in the resort and leisure industry in Sri Lanka. The resort will also include 427 apartments. The hotel consists of 800 rooms and twenty restaurants and bars including six specialty restaurants. A five-storied shopping mall connects to the hotel.

Building	Floor count
Car park and exhibition center	10
Hotel	32
Car park and retail building	12
Residence Tower	47
Suites Tower	41
Office Tower	31

=== Hotels ===
The integrated resort comprises two luxury hotel properties operated by different hospitality partners. The 687-room Cinnamon Life hotel is operated by John Keells Holdings, while the 113-room Nuwa Hotel is operated by Melco Resorts & Entertainment. Together, the hotels provide more than 800 rooms within the City of Dreams Sri Lanka development.

The hotels are designed as part of a larger mixed-use integrated resort concept, where hospitality is combined with gaming, retail, dining, entertainment, and MICE (meetings, incentives, conferences, and exhibitions) facilities.

=== Leisure ===
The development comprises approximately 14 restaurants and bars, including food and beverage facilities located within the casino, an all-day dining buffet, poolside bar services, and multiple lounge and nightlife venues.

The gaming facility at City of Dreams Sri Lanka is located on Level 6 of the integrated resort in Colombo. It spans approximately 180,000 sq. ft. and forms part of South Asia’s first fully integrated resort, combining gaming, hospitality, entertainment, retail, and MICE facilities.

The gaming operation is managed by Melco Resorts & Entertainment in partnership with John Keells Holdings.

The retail precinct at City of Dreams is located on Levels 7 and 8 of the integrated resort. It features a mix of international and regional brands across fashion, beauty, accessories and lifestyle categories, along with selected dining outlets.

== MICE facilities ==
City of Dreams Sri Lanka incorporates a large-scale Meetings, Incentives, Conferences and Exhibitions (MICE) component. The resort features over 160,000 square feet of flexible event space.

== See also ==
- List of hotels in Sri Lanka
- List of most expensive buildings
- List of integrated resorts
