= MGM Osaka =

Planned hotel resort in Osaka, Japan

Coordinates: 34.652°N 135.388°E

- Interactive map of MGM Osaka
- Location: Yumeshima, Osaka, Japan
- Opened: 2030
- No. of rooms: 2,500
- Casino type: Resort
- Operating license holder: MGM Resorts International

MGM Osaka (MGM大阪) is an under-construction integrated resort developed by MGM Resorts International and Orix being built on Yumeshima island in Osaka, Japan. Construction on the resort commenced on April 24, 2025.

== History ==
In April 2014, Governor Ichirō Matsui of Osaka Prefecture announced that it would promote Yumeshima as a possible location for an integrated resort.

Construction on the resort began on April 24, 2025 and is expected to open by 2030. The resort is also expected to have a rail link built via an extension of the Nara Line which will connect it to the rest of Osaka. The resort will be located on Yumeshima island, which hosted Expo 2025.

== Features ==
MGM Osaka will feature 2,500 guest rooms across three hotels; MGM Osaka, MGM Villas, and MUSUBI Hotel. The resort will also feature 67,820 square meters of convention space and will feature the first casino in Japan. A 3,500 seat theater, retail and dining options will also be part of the development.

== See also ==
- List of integrated resorts
- Gambling in Japan
