= City of Dreams Mediterranean =

Largest casino hotel in Europe

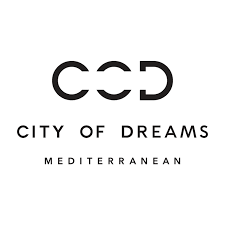
- Logo

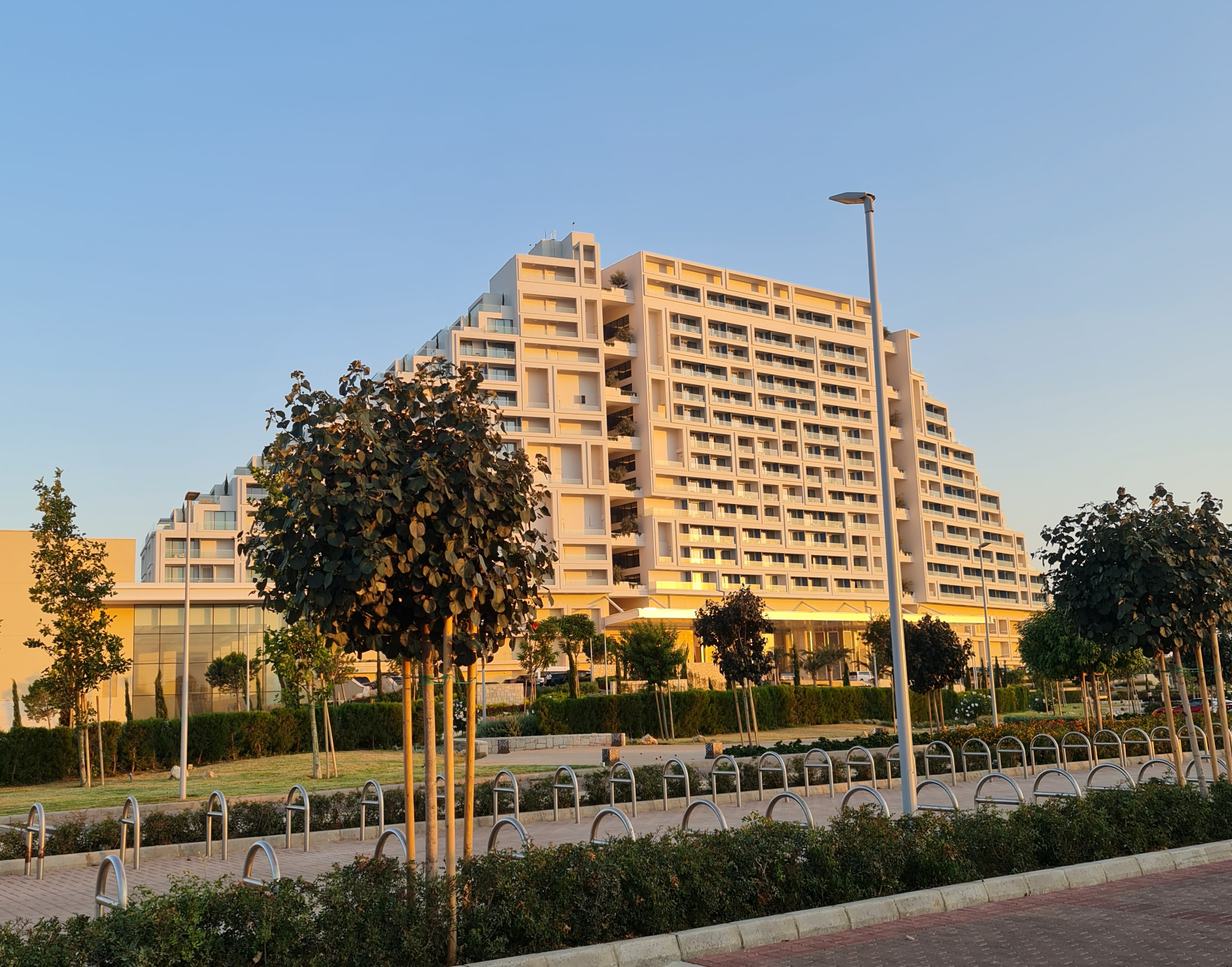
- Front view of the resort
- Interactive map of City of Dreams Mediterranean
- Location: Zakaki, Limassol, Limassol, Cyprus; Nikou Kavvadia, Limassol, 3150; 34.6472°N 32.9939°E
- Opened: Soft opening June 12, 2023; Grand opening July 10, 2023
- No. of rooms: 500
- Gaming space: 7,500 square metres (81,000 sq ft)
- Notable restaurants: Anaïs; Amber Dragon; Oléa; Center Stage; Aura; The Lounge; Aqua Bar; Veranda Café
- Casino type: Land-based; American-style casino
- Owner: Melco Resorts & Entertainment
- Website: cityofdreamsmed.com

City of Dreams Mediterranean is a 14.8-acre (6.0 ha) luxury integrated resort and casino in the Zakaki suburb of Limassol, Cyprus. It opened fully on 10 July 2023 as Europe’s first integrated resort and, as of 2024, the largest of its kind in the European Union, with a fourteen-storey hotel (500 rooms and suites), 7,500 square metres (81,000 sq ft) of casino floor and more than 8,000 square metres (86,000 sq ft) of meeting and event space.

== History ==
The project is owned and operated by Melco Resorts & Entertainment. Melco increased its stake in the project to 75% in 2019, before completion.

A soft opening took place on 12 June 2023, followed by the official opening on 10 July 2023. Upon opening, Melco confirmed it would continue operating its licensed “C2” satellite casinos around Cyprus, while the prior temporary casino at Limassol ceased operations.

== Design and architecture ==
The main building rises 14 storeys in a glass-fronted trapezoidal form overlooking Limassol's coastline. Local firm J+A Philippou acted as Architect of Record and Structural Engineer of Record, collaborating with Atkins (Hong Kong) as lead architect. Interiors follow Melco's international luxury standards with Mediterranean influences.

== Facilities ==
- Accommodation. 500 guestrooms and suites with floor-to-ceiling windows; selected rooms and suites include sea-view terraces.
- Dining and retail. Multiple outlets including Amber Dragon, Oléa and Anaïs, alongside lounges and bars; on-site luxury retail is positioned around the central atrium.
- Leisure. Outdoor pool complexes, spa (Lotus Spa), fitness facilities, a family adventure park and an open-air amphitheatre for live entertainment.

== Casino ==
The casino occupies about 7,500 square metres (81,000 sq ft) and, at launch, included roughly 1,000 slot machines and about 100 live gaming tables, with dedicated VIP rooms.

== Meetings and events ==
The resort includes more than 8,000 square metres (86,000 sq ft) of indoor and outdoor MICE facilities (EXPO Centre), including a grand ballroom seating up to 880 guests, a high-volume hall (The Forum, 12 m ceiling), a 200-seat amphitheatre and terraced lawns for outdoor functions. The EXPO Centre is among the largest dedicated event venues in Cyprus.

== Sustainability and awards ==
At the design stage the project achieved a BREEAM “Excellent” rating (score 80.4%), the first Cyprus development reported to receive this level at that time. Melco has also publicised further sustainability recognitions for the property since opening.

== Access ==
The resort is located in Zakaki, western Limassol, near the A6 approach to Limassol and the city's port district; the address is Nikou Kavvadia Street, Zakaki 3150.

== See also ==
- List of casino hotels
- List of integrated resorts
- Hard Rock Hotel & Casino Athens
