= List of integrated resorts =

Casino resort list

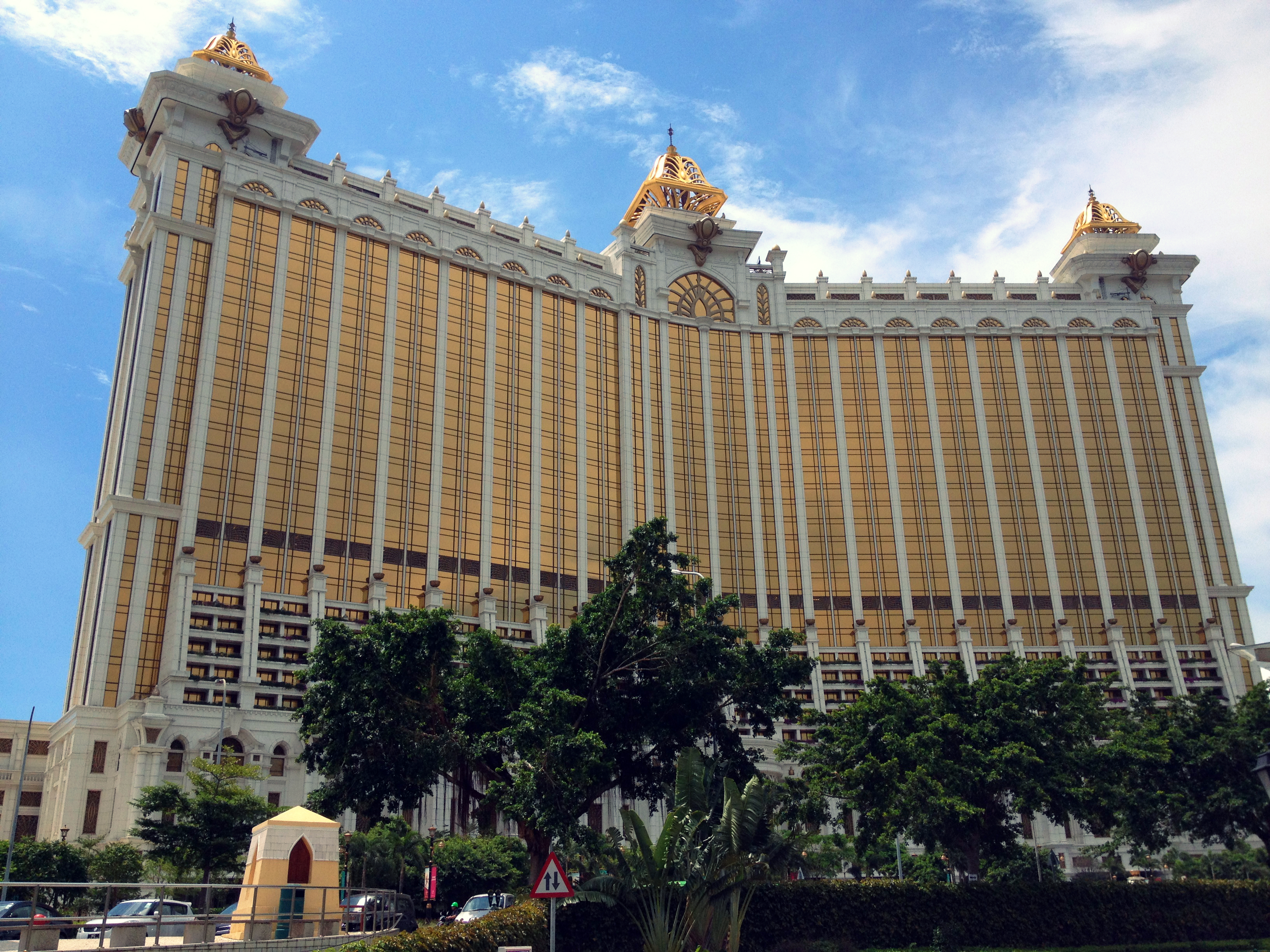
The Galaxy Macau in Macau is a prominent example of an integrated resort.

An integrated resort is a type of casino hotel that features hotel space, a casino, convention or meeting space, retail, dining and entertainment options. This article lists integrated resorts by their locations. Integrated resorts which are currently in operation or are scheduled to open are listed on this page. Integrated resorts which have closed are not listed on this page.

== Australia ==
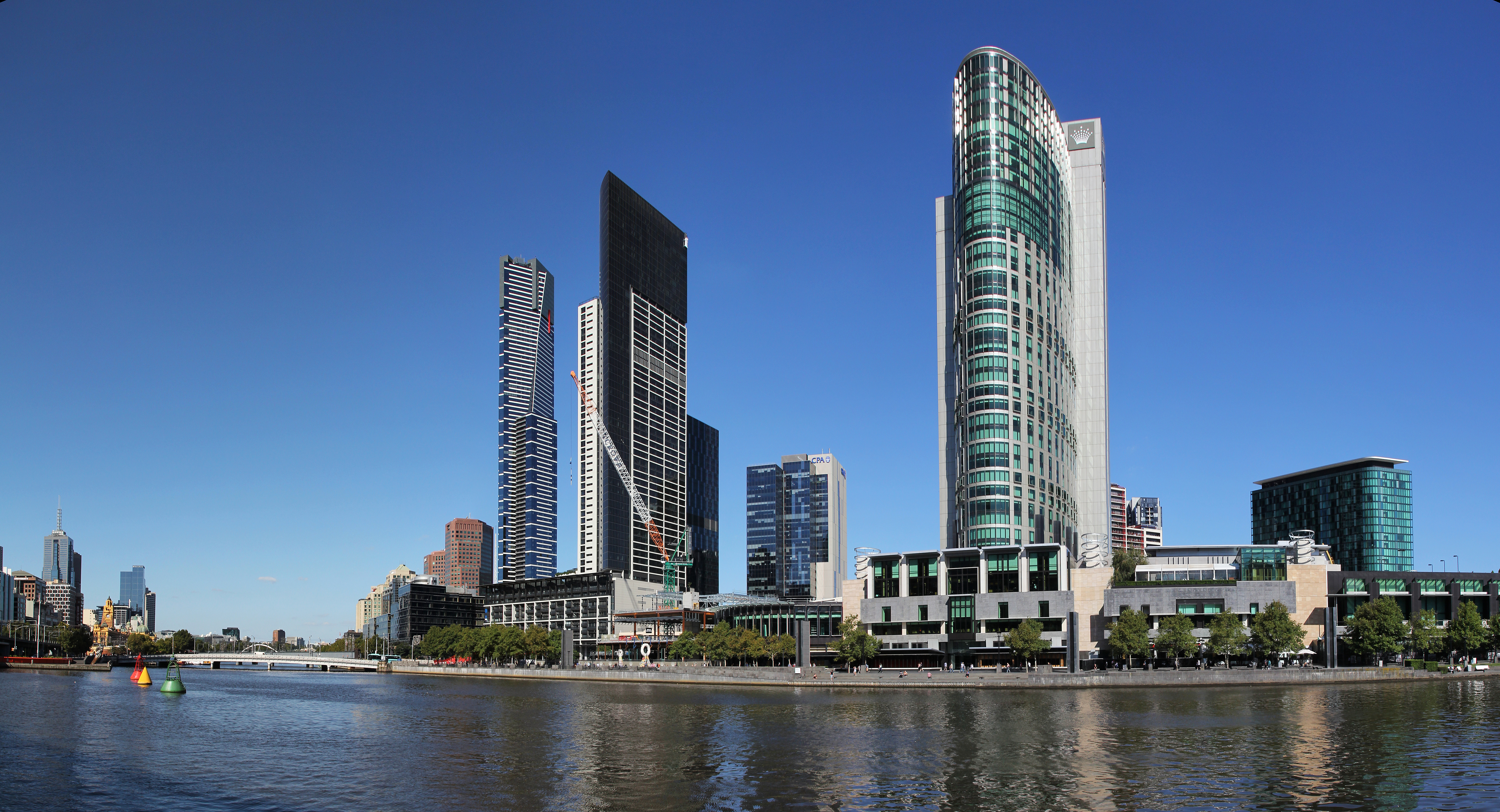
The Crown Melbourne in Southbank, Victoria contains the largest casino in the Southern Hemisphere.

Gambling is widely popular in Australia and the country is home to multiple casinos. Crown Resorts and Bally's Corporation through its Star Entertainment Group subsidiary are the two Australian companies that operate the six integrated resorts that are located in Australia.

=== New South Wales ===
- Crown Sydney
- The Star, Sydney

=== Queensland ===
- The Star Brisbane
- The Star Gold Coast

=== Victoria ===
- Crown Melbourne

=== Western Australia ===
- Crown Perth

== Bahamas ==
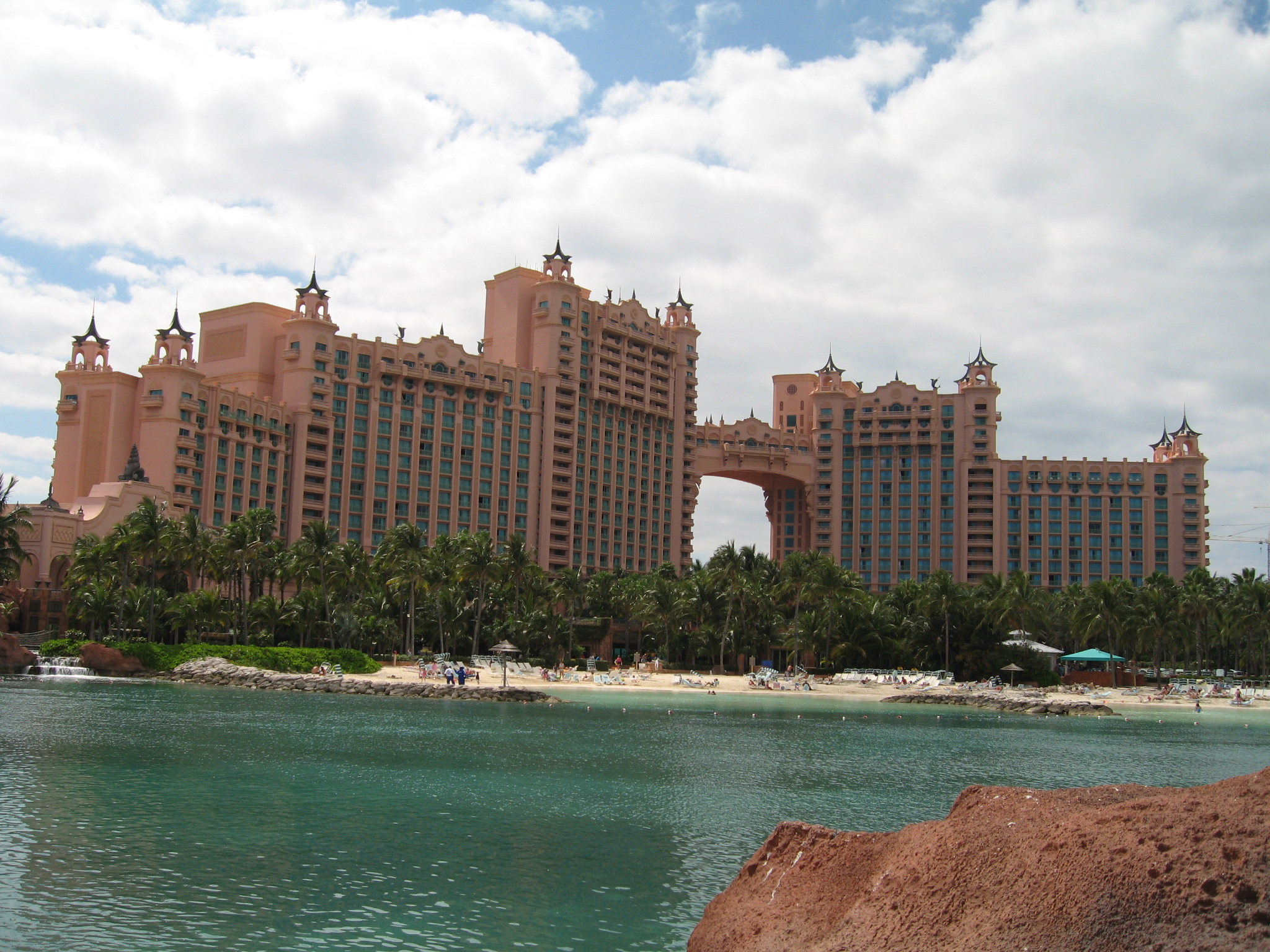
Atlantis Paradise Island is located close to Nassau and is amongst the most popular hotels in The Bahamas.

The Bahamas is home to three integrated resorts, two of which are in and around Nassau. The Caribbean nation is the only country in the Caribbean that has integrated resorts.

=== Bimini ===
- Resorts World Bimini

=== Nassau ===
- Atlantis Paradise Island
- Baha Mar

== Canada ==
Ontario is the only Canadian province that has integrated resorts. Windsor's gambling market competes with its US neighbor of Detroit, which contains three integrated resorts.

=== Ontario ===
- Caesars Windsor
- Casino Rama
- Niagara Fallsview Casino Resort

== China ==
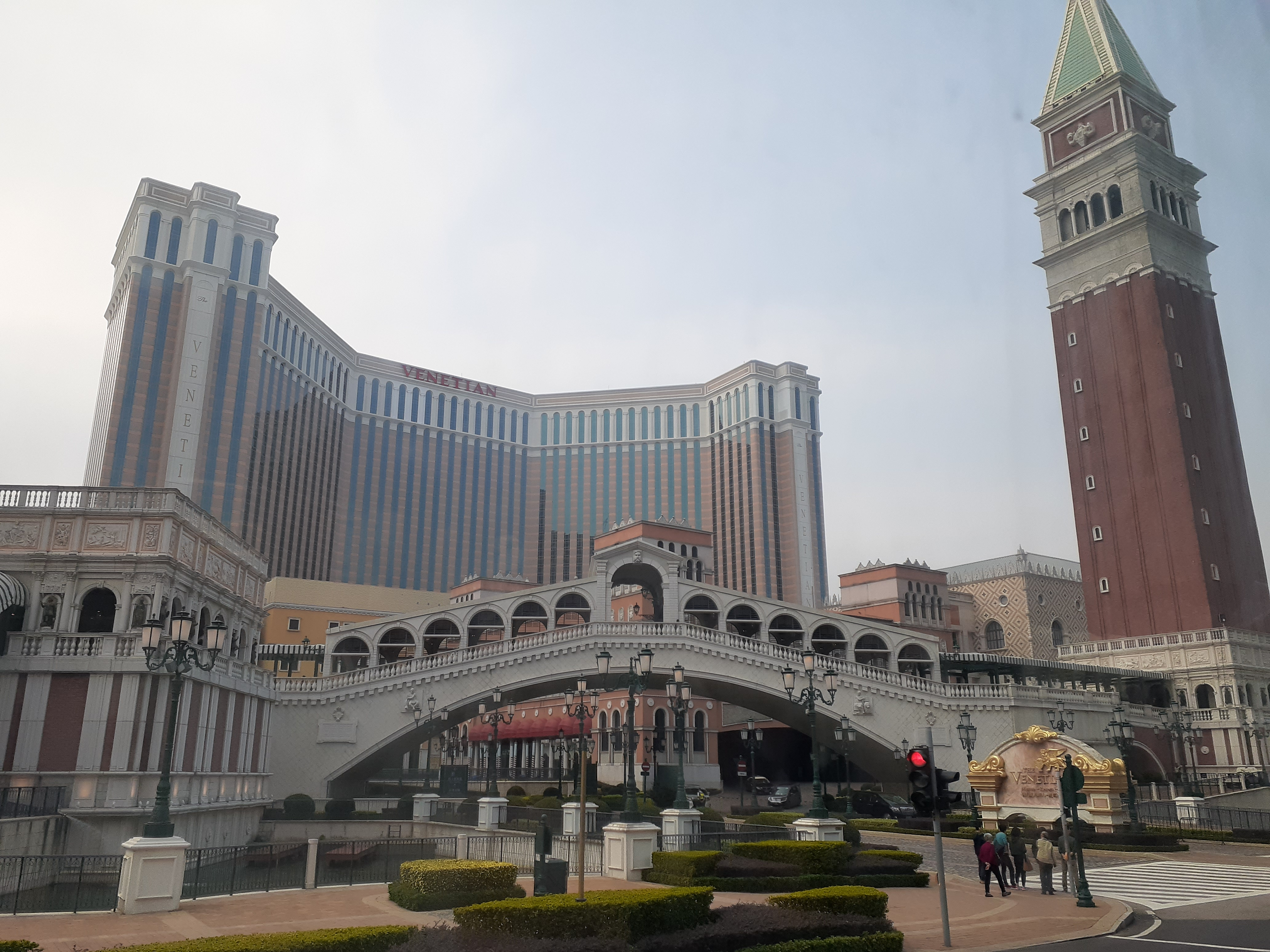
The Venetian Macao is located on the Cotai Strip and features one of the world's largest casinos.

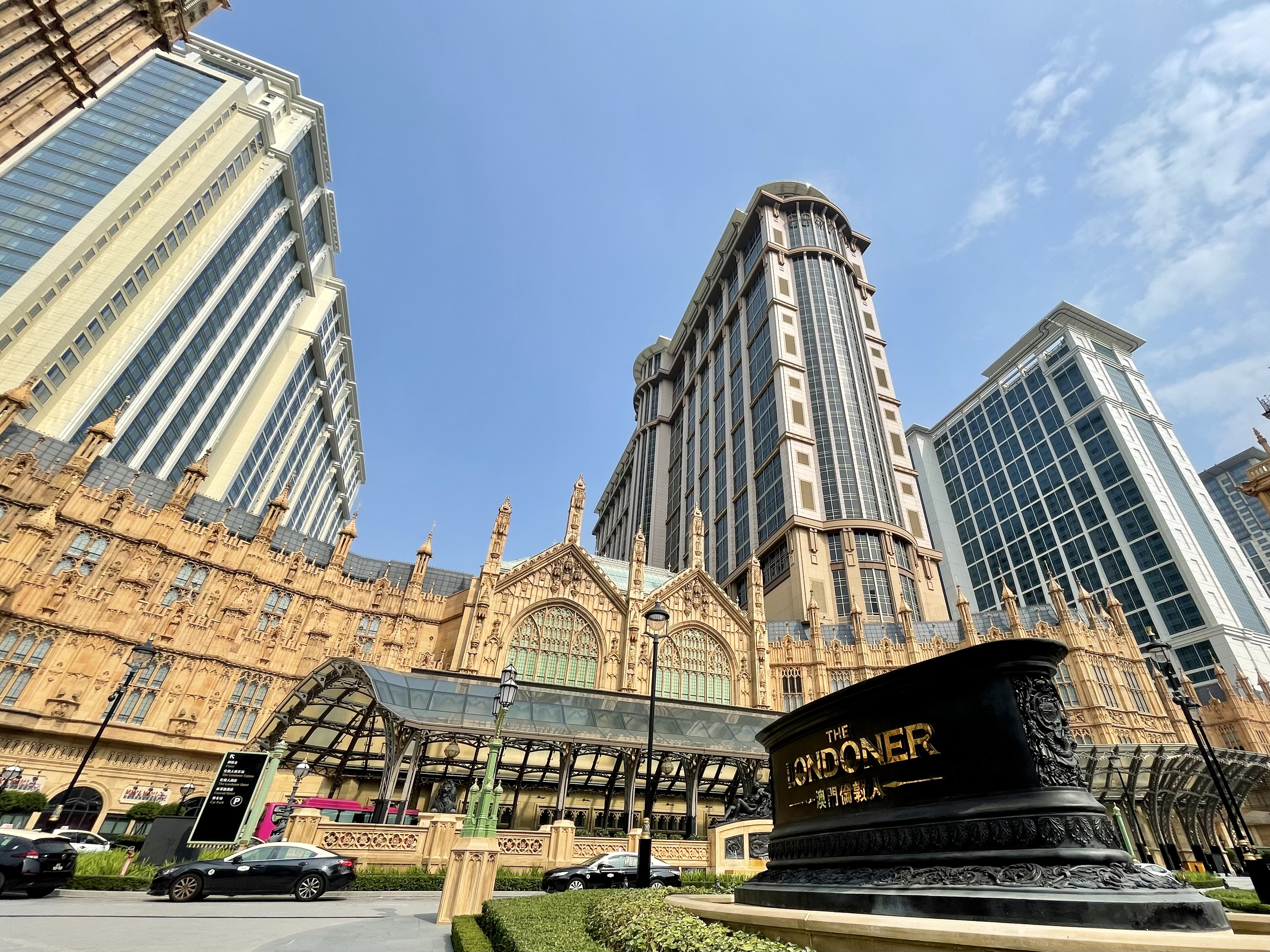
The Londoner Macao is the largest hotel in Macau.

Macau is one of two Special administrative regions of China and is the only place in China where gambling is legal. Macau is the world's number one gambling market. Las Vegas Sands, Melco Resorts & Entertainment, Wynn Resorts, MGM Resorts and Galaxy Entertainment Group operate the majority of the integrated resorts in Macau.

=== Macau ===
==== Cotai ====
- City of Dreams
- Galaxy Macau
- The Londoner Macao
- MGM Cotai
- The Parisian Macao
- Studio City
- The Venetian Macao
- Wynn Palace

==== Santo António ====
- Ponte 16

==== Sé ====
- Casino Lisboa & Grand Lisboa
- MGM Macau
- Sands Macao
- Wynn Macau & Encore at Wynn Macau

==== Taipa ====
- Altira Macau

== Cyprus ==
In 2023, Cyprus became the first and only country in the European Union to become home to an integrated resort, despite the presence of casinos throughout the European Union. Melco Resorts & Entertainment became the first company to develop an integrated resort in the European Union.

=== Limassol ===
- City of Dreams Mediterranean

== Greece ==
Greece will become the home of the first integrated resort in Continental Europe by 2027.

=== Athens ===
- Hard Rock Hotel & Casino Athens (Opening 2027)

== Japan ==
MGM Resorts is building Japan's first integrated resort which will open by 2030. It will also contain the first legal casino in the country.

=== Osaka ===
- MGM Osaka (Opening 2030)

== Malaysia ==
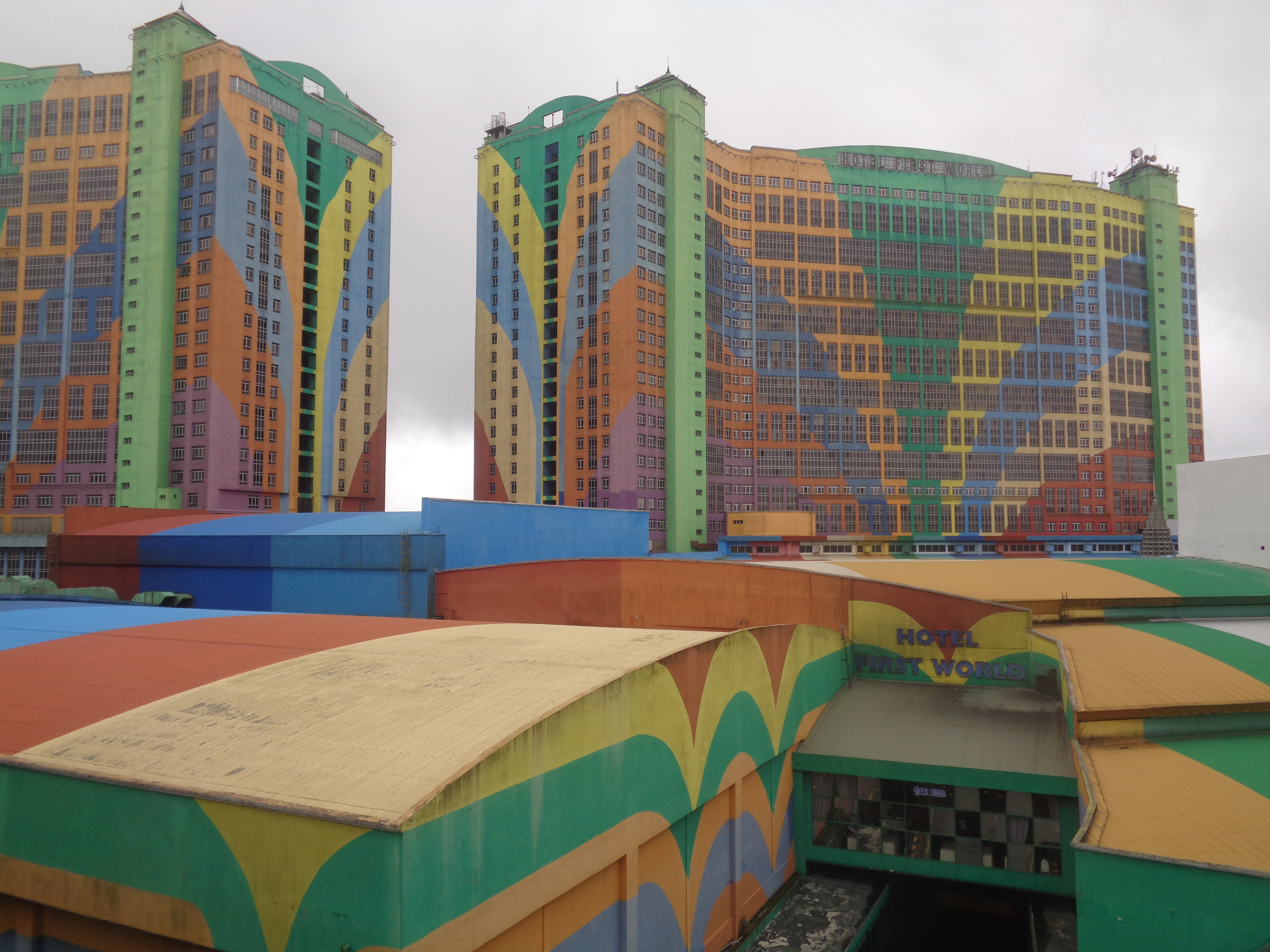
The First World Hotel & Plaza is the largest hotel in the world. It is part of the Genting Highlands development.

Malaysia is home to one integrated resort, located in Pahang and it is also the largest hotel in the world. The country is home to Genting Group which operates integrated resorts and casinos in multiple countries all over the world.

=== Pahang ===
- First World Hotel & Plaza (Genting Highlands)

== New Zealand ==
New Zealand is home to one integrated resort, located in Auckland.

=== Auckland ===
- SkyCity Auckland

== Philippines ==
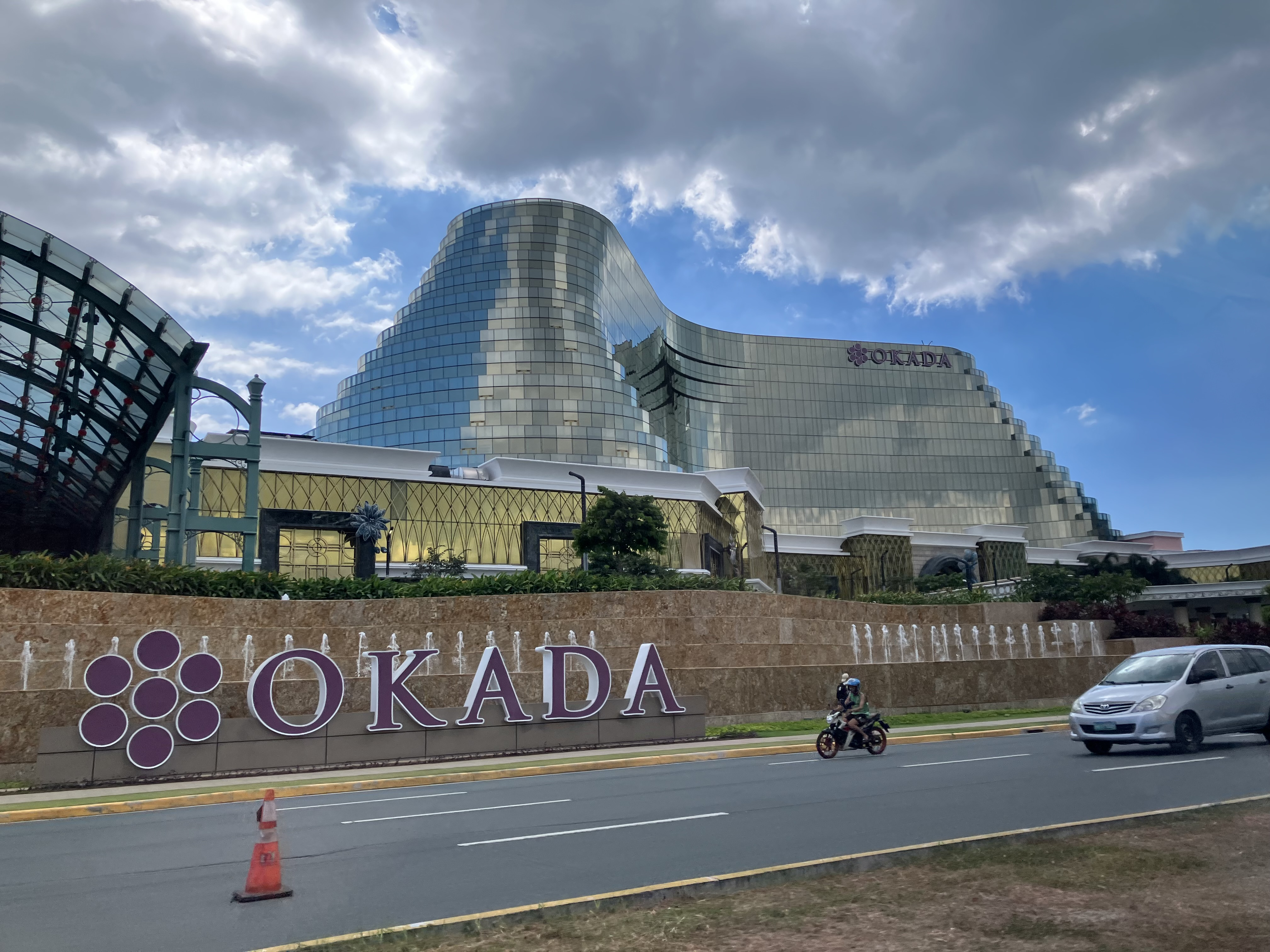
Okada Manila is one of several popular integrated resorts in the Philippines.

Gambling has a long history in the Philippines and the country is home to many casinos. Today the country is home to eight integrated resorts.

=== Cebu City ===
- Nustar Resort and Casino
- Waterfront Cebu City Hotel & Casino

=== Manila ===
- City of Dreams Manila
- Newport World Resorts
- Okada Manila
- Solaire Resort Entertainment City

=== Pampanga ===
- Hann Resorts

=== San Fernando ===
- Thunderbird Resorts

== Singapore ==
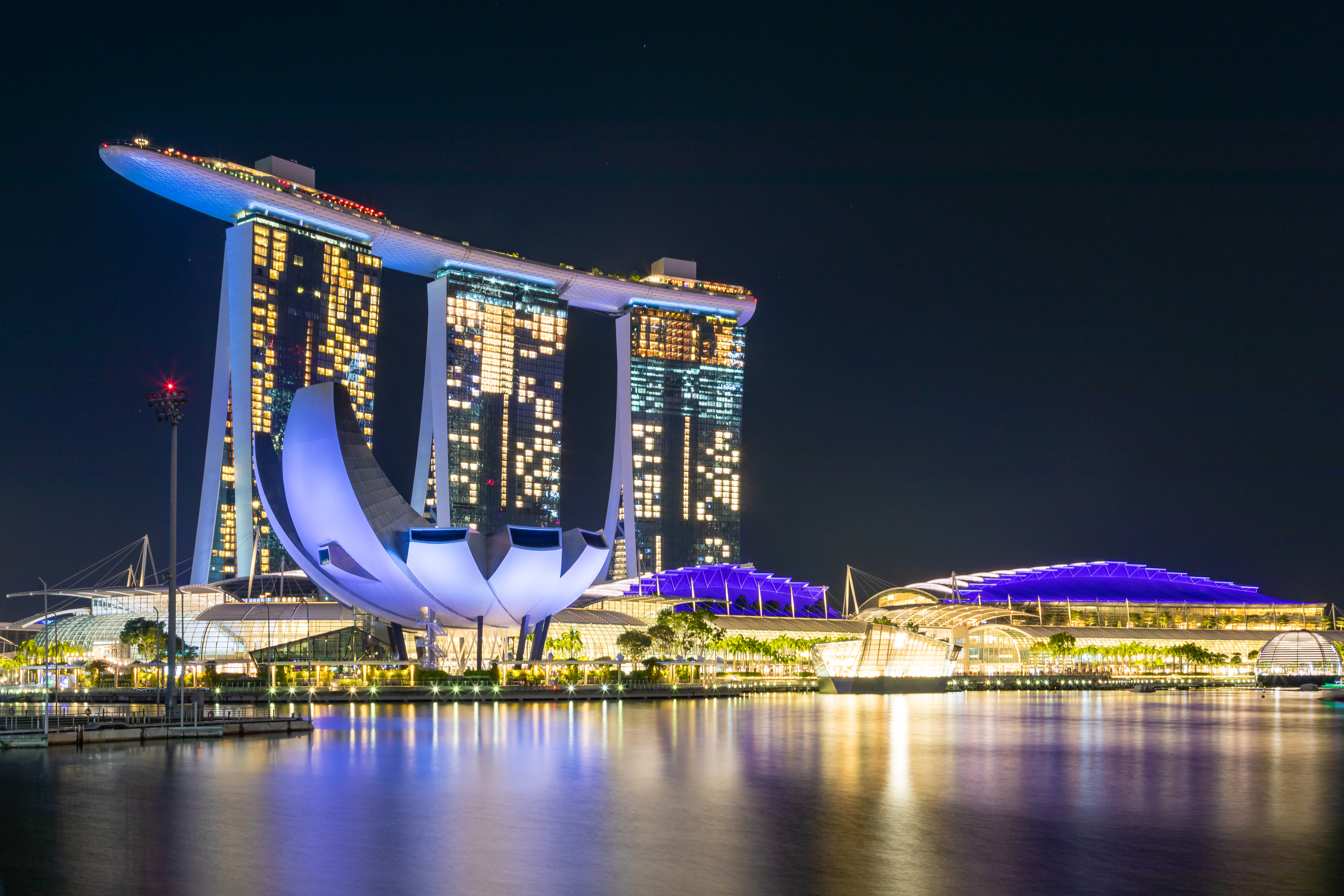
The Marina Bay Sands is one of Singapore's most recognized landmarks.

Singapore contains two integrated resorts, both of which opened in 2010. Genting Group and Las Vegas Sands were the two companies to secure gaming licenses in Singapore. The term, integrated resorts was first coined in Singapore. Since then the term has become widely used in the hospitality industry throughout the world. Singapore's integrated resorts have played an important role in Singapore's tourism industry.

=== Marina Bay ===
- Marina Bay Sands

=== Sentosa ===
- Resorts World Sentosa

== Sri Lanka ==
Sri Lanka is home to one integrated resort which opened in 2025 and became the first of its kind in the South Asia. Melco Resorts & Entertainment became the first gaming company to enter the market with their integrated resort.

=== Colombo ===
- City of Dreams Sri Lanka

== United Arab Emirates ==
By 2027, the United Arab Emirates will become the first and only country in the Middle East and the Arab World to feature an integrated resort. Wynn Resorts is the first company and currently the only company to hold a gaming license in the UAE.

=== Ras Al Khaimah ===
- Wynn Al Marjan Island (Opening 2027)

== United Kingdom ==
Gambling is popular throughout the UK and England is home to one integrated resort. There are no integrated resorts in Scotland, Wales or Northern Ireland.

=== England ===
==== Birmingham ====
- Resorts World Birmingham

== United States ==
Gambling is widely popular in the US. The US has more integrated resorts than any other country in the world. Integrated resorts in the US are either commercial casinos or are Native American gaming resorts which sit on reservation land. MGM Resorts, Caesars Entertainment, Las Vegas Sands and Wynn Resorts are among the top gaming companies in the world and are all based in the US state of Nevada.

=== California ===
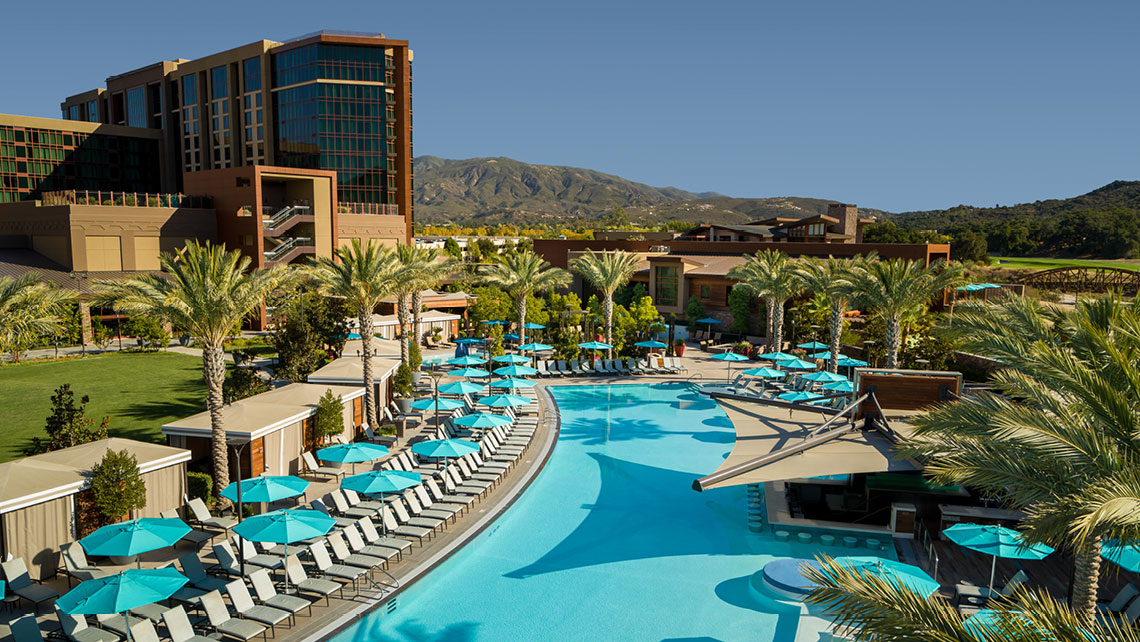
The Pechanga Resort Casino in Temecula, California is the largest integrated resort in the state.

Despite having no commercial casinos, Native American gaming in California has been lucrative and in 2022 generated more revenue than the Las Vegas Strip. Amongst Native American gaming in the state, California is currently home to three integrated resorts.

- Harrah's Resort Southern California
- Morongo Casino, Resort & Spa
- Pechanga Resort Casino

=== Connecticut ===
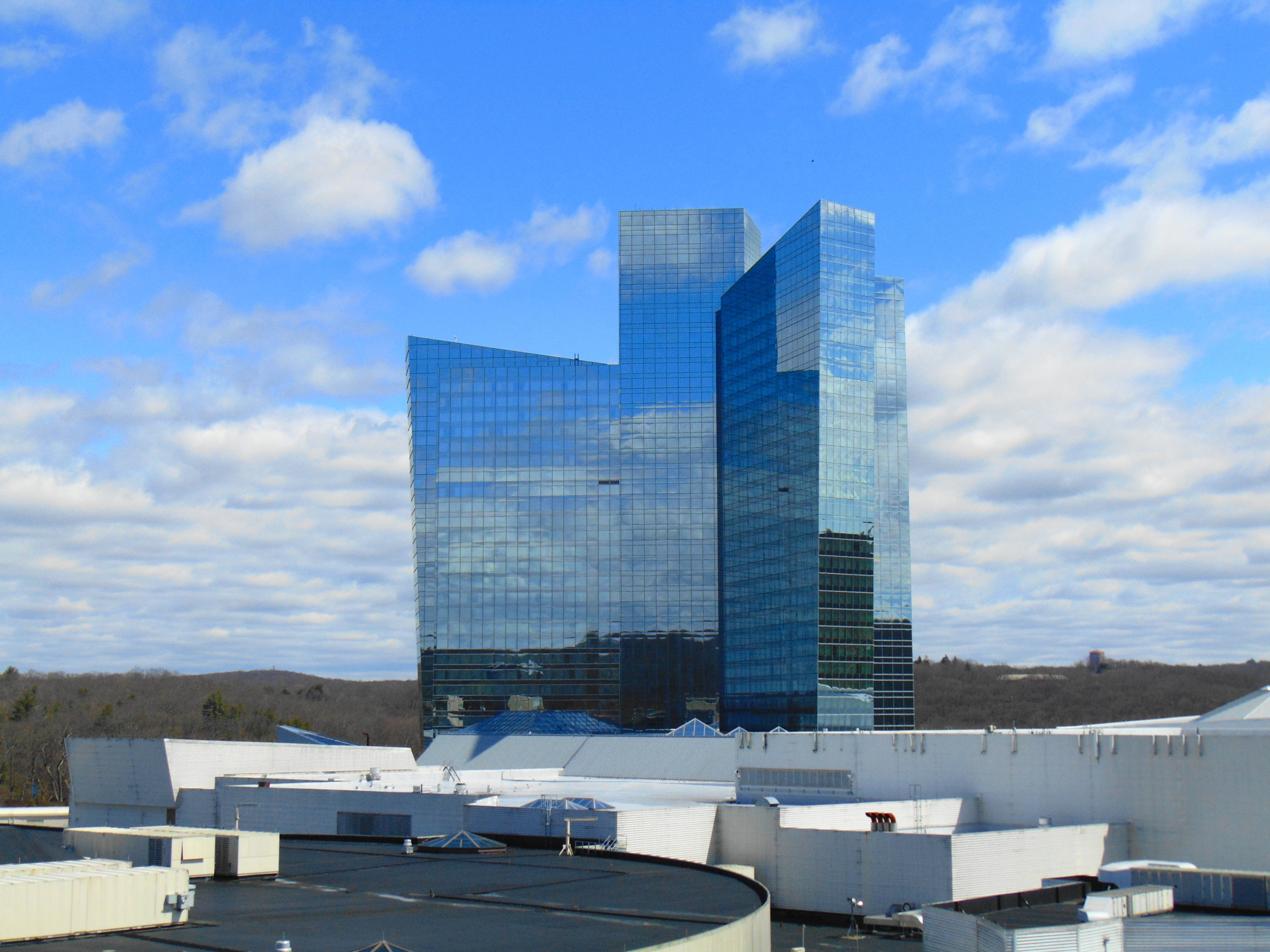
Mohegan Sun in Uncasville, Connecticut has one of the largest casinos in the US.

Tribal gaming in Connecticut began in 1986. The following decade saw the development of two Native American integrated resorts in the state with the Mashantucket Pequot and Mohegan Tribes developing their resorts. Today, both hotels have two of the largest casinos in the United States.

- Foxwoods Resort Casino
- Mohegan Sun

=== Florida ===
The Seminole Tribe of Florida operates multiple casinos in Florida and owns Hard Rock International, which operates casinos, hotels, and restaurants around the world. Florida is currently home to two integrated resorts, both of which are operated by the Seminole Tribe.

- Seminole Hard Rock Hotel & Casino Hollywood
- Seminole Hard Rock Hotel and Casino Tampa

=== Illinois ===
- Bally's Chicago (Opening 2027)

=== Indiana ===
- Caesars Southern Indiana

=== Maryland ===
- MGM National Harbor

=== Massachusetts ===
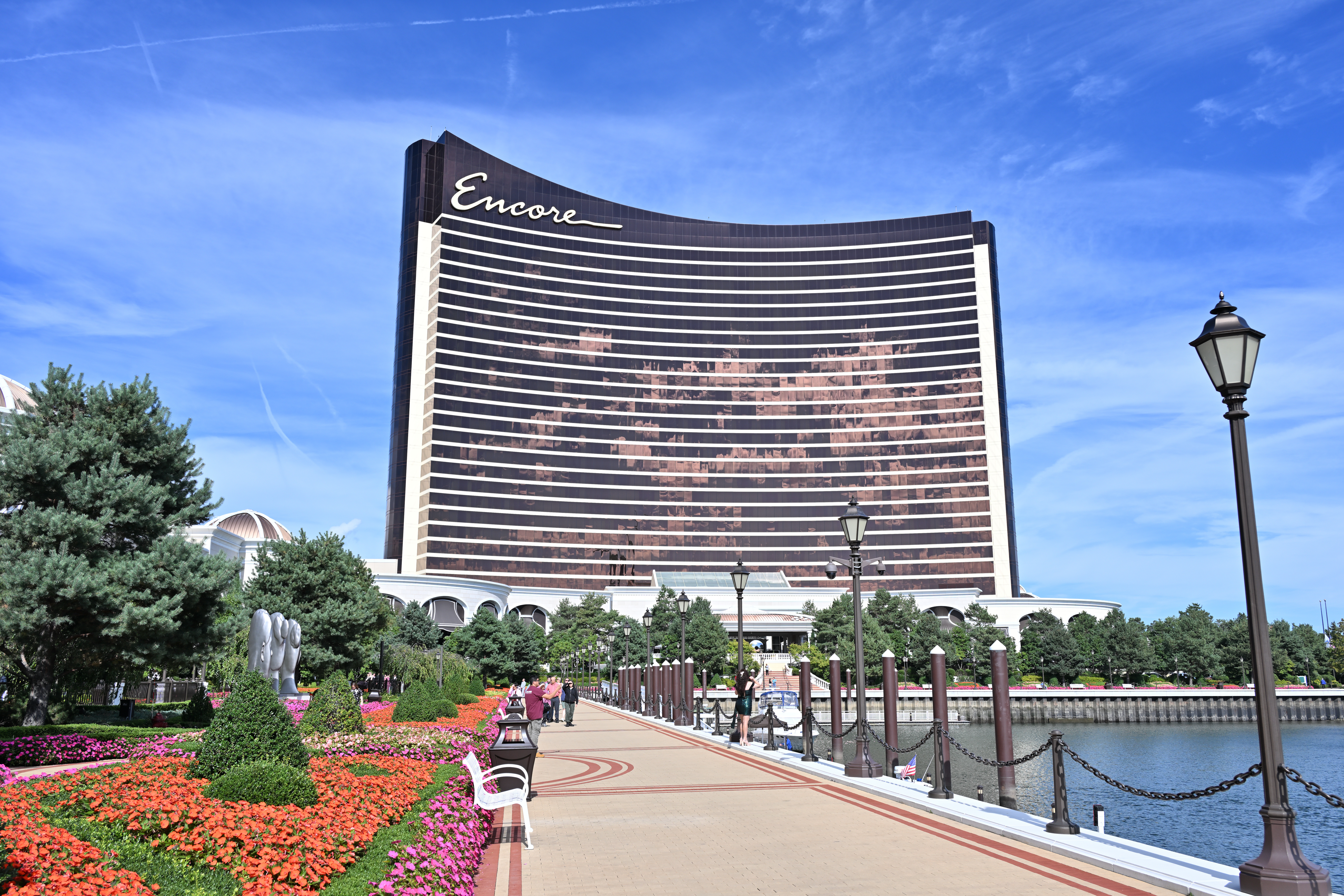
Encore Boston Harbor in Everett, Massachusetts opened in 2019.

The passage of the Expanded Gaming Act in 2011 allowed for the addition of commercial casino resorts to be built in the state. As a result, one integrated resort was developed by Wynn Resorts outside of Boston.

- Encore Boston Harbor

=== Michigan ===
Michigan is home to over two dozen casinos with the state's three integrated resorts being located in Detroit, all of which opened between the late 1990s and 2000s.

==== Detroit ====
- Hollywood Casino at Greektown
- MGM Grand Detroit
- MotorCity Casino Hotel

=== Minnesota ===
- Treasure Island Resort & Casino

=== Mississippi ===
- Beau Rivage
- Hard Rock Hotel & Casino Biloxi

=== Nevada ===
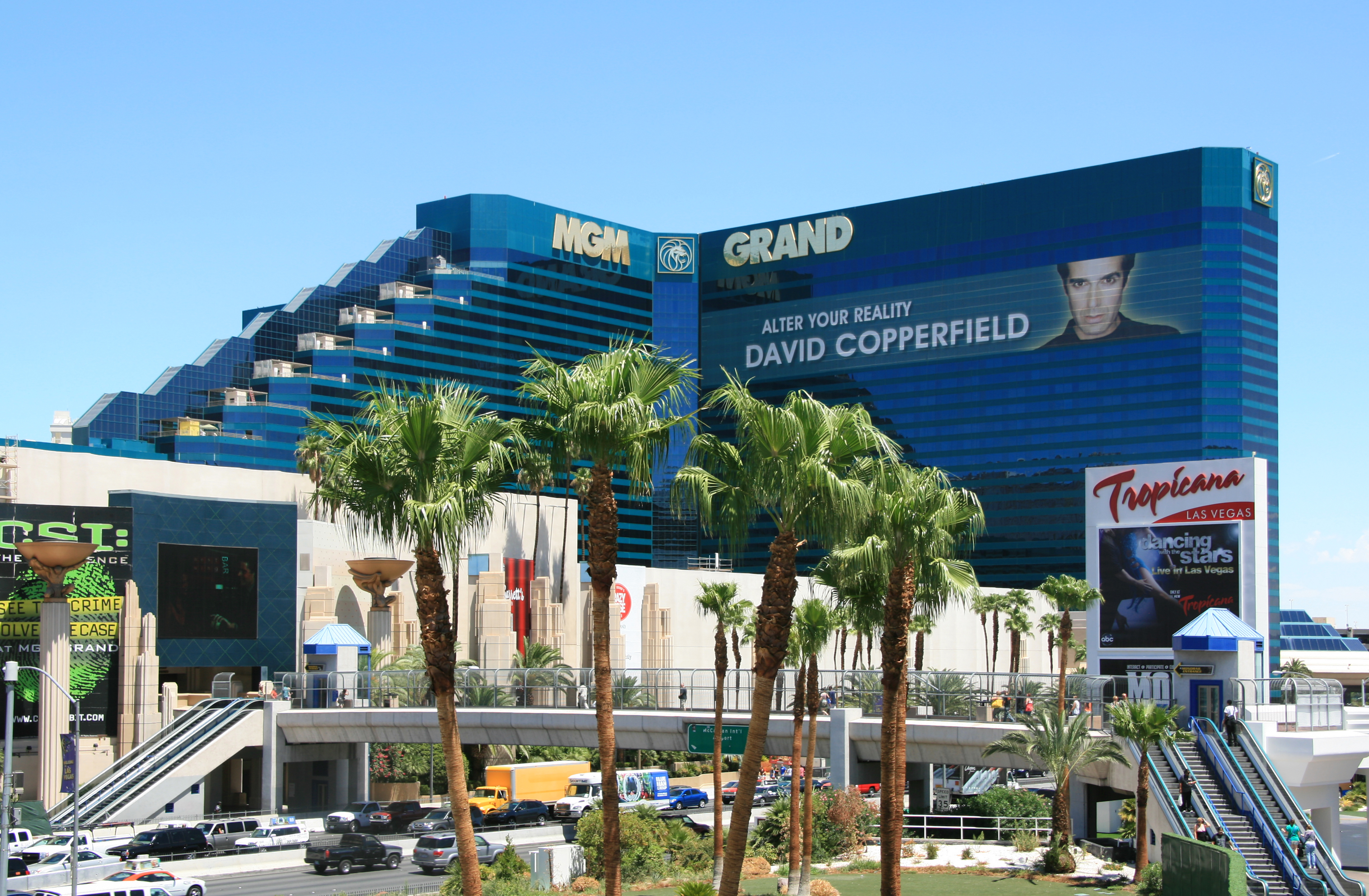
MGM Grand Las Vegas was the largest hotel in the world when it opened.

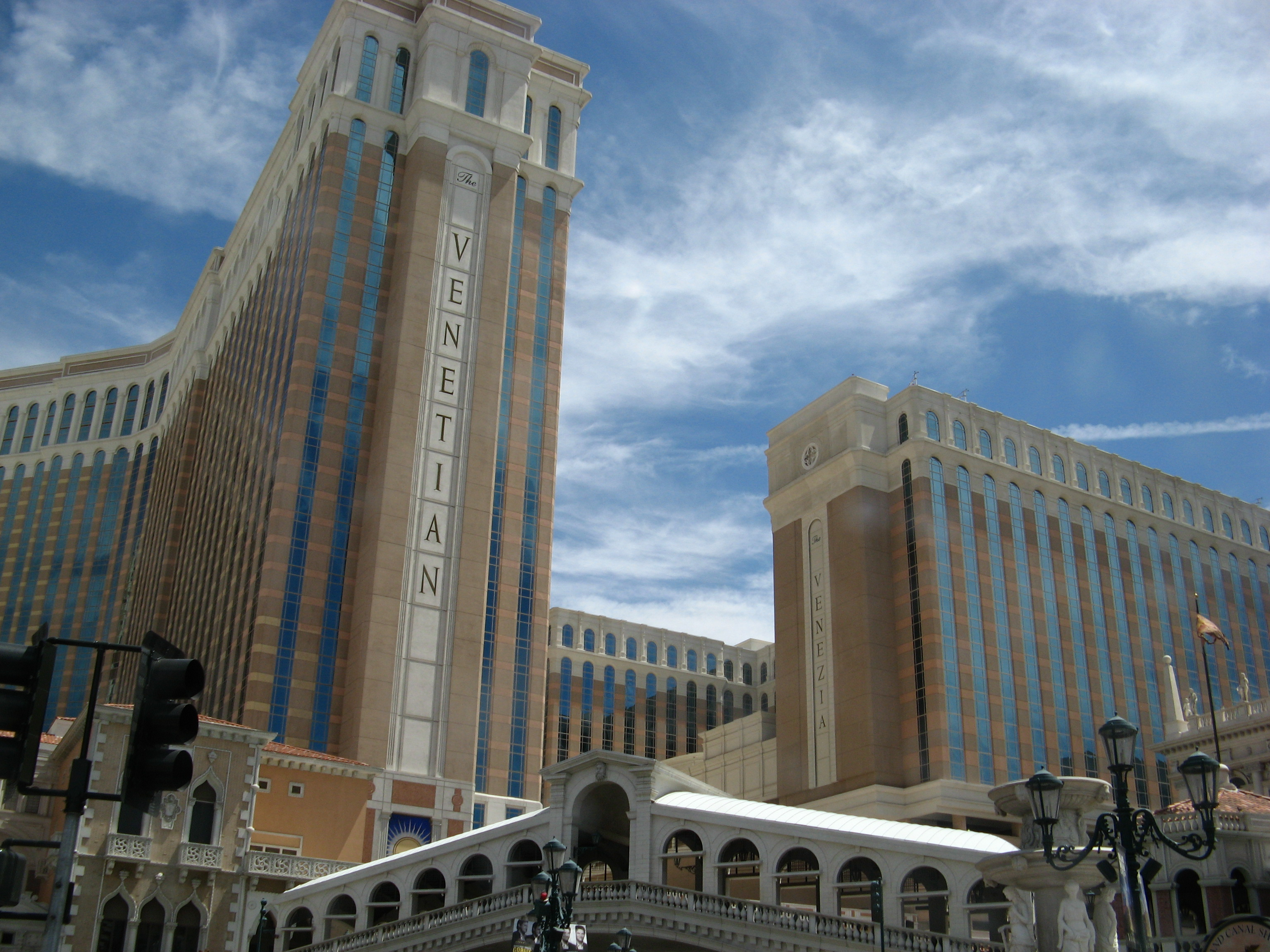
The Venetian Las Vegas along with The Palazzo (not pictured) make up the largest hotel in the US.

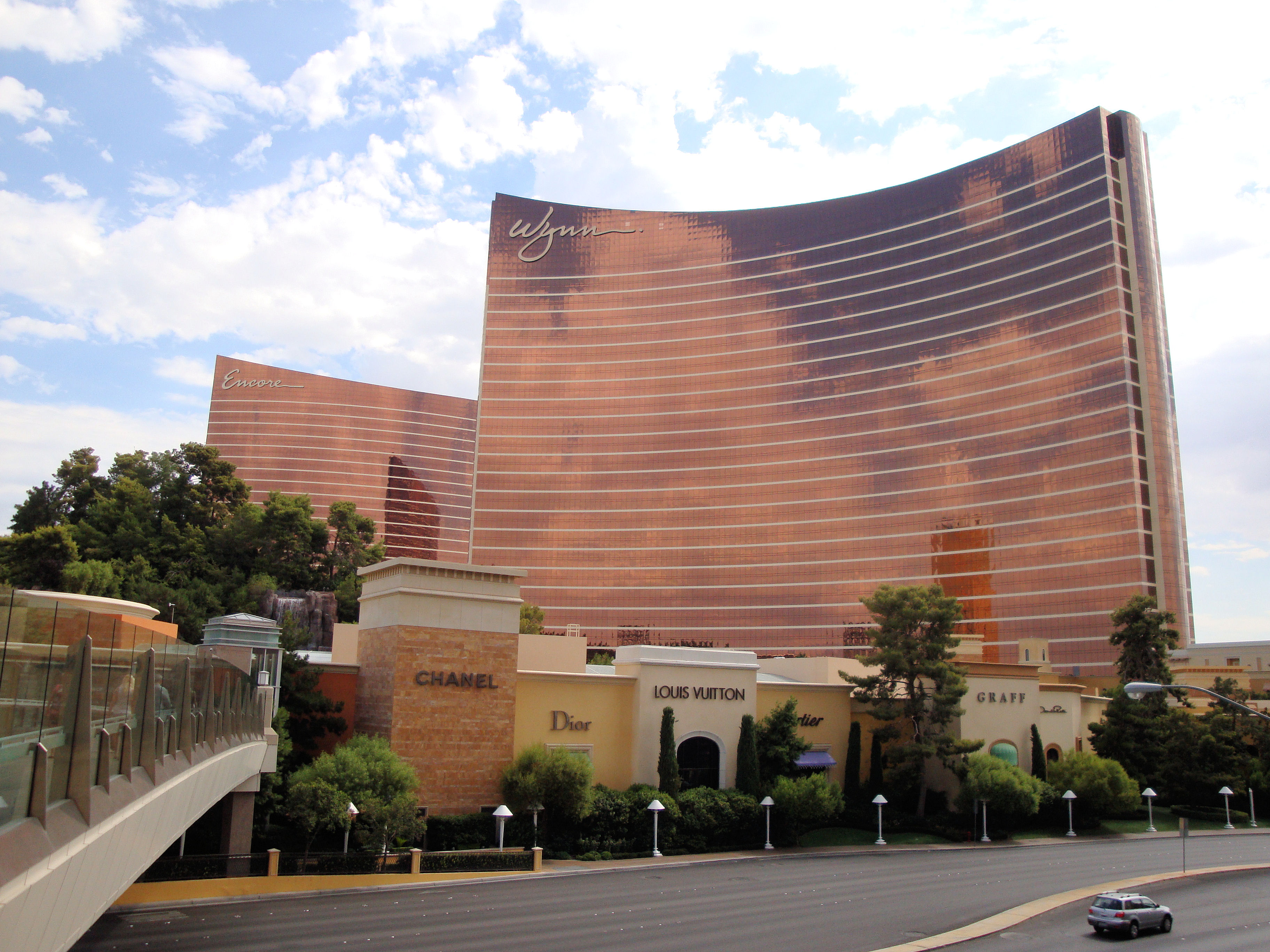
Wynn & Encore Las Vegas combined have the most casino space on the Las Vegas Strip.

Las Vegas has more integrated resorts than anyplace else in the world. Most of the integrated resorts in Las Vegas are located along the Las Vegas Strip in Paradise and Winchester. Las Vegas is the top gambling market in the US and is a top tourist destination. MGM Resorts, Caesars Entertainment and Wynn Resorts are amongst the top operators of the integrated resorts in Las Vegas. Nevada's only integrated resort outside of Las Vegas is located in Reno.

==== Las Vegas ====
- Aria Resort and Casino (CityCenter)
- Bellagio
- Caesars Palace
- Circus Circus Las Vegas
- Cosmopolitan of Las Vegas
- Excalibur Hotel and Casino
- Flamingo Las Vegas
- Fontainebleau Las Vegas
- Hard Rock Las Vegas (Opening 2027)
- Harrah's Las Vegas
- Horseshoe Las Vegas
- The Linq
- Luxor Las Vegas
- Mandalay Bay, Four Seasons & W Las Vegas
- MGM Grand Las Vegas & The Signature at MGM Grand
- New York-New York Hotel and Casino
- Palms Casino Resort & Palms Place
- Paris Las Vegas
- Park MGM
- Planet Hollywood Las Vegas & Elara
- Resorts World Las Vegas
- Rio
- Sahara Las Vegas
- The Strat
- Treasure Island Hotel and Casino
- The Venetian Las Vegas & The Palazzo
- Westgate Las Vegas
- Wynn Las Vegas & Encore

==== Reno ====
- Grand Sierra Resort

=== New Jersey ===
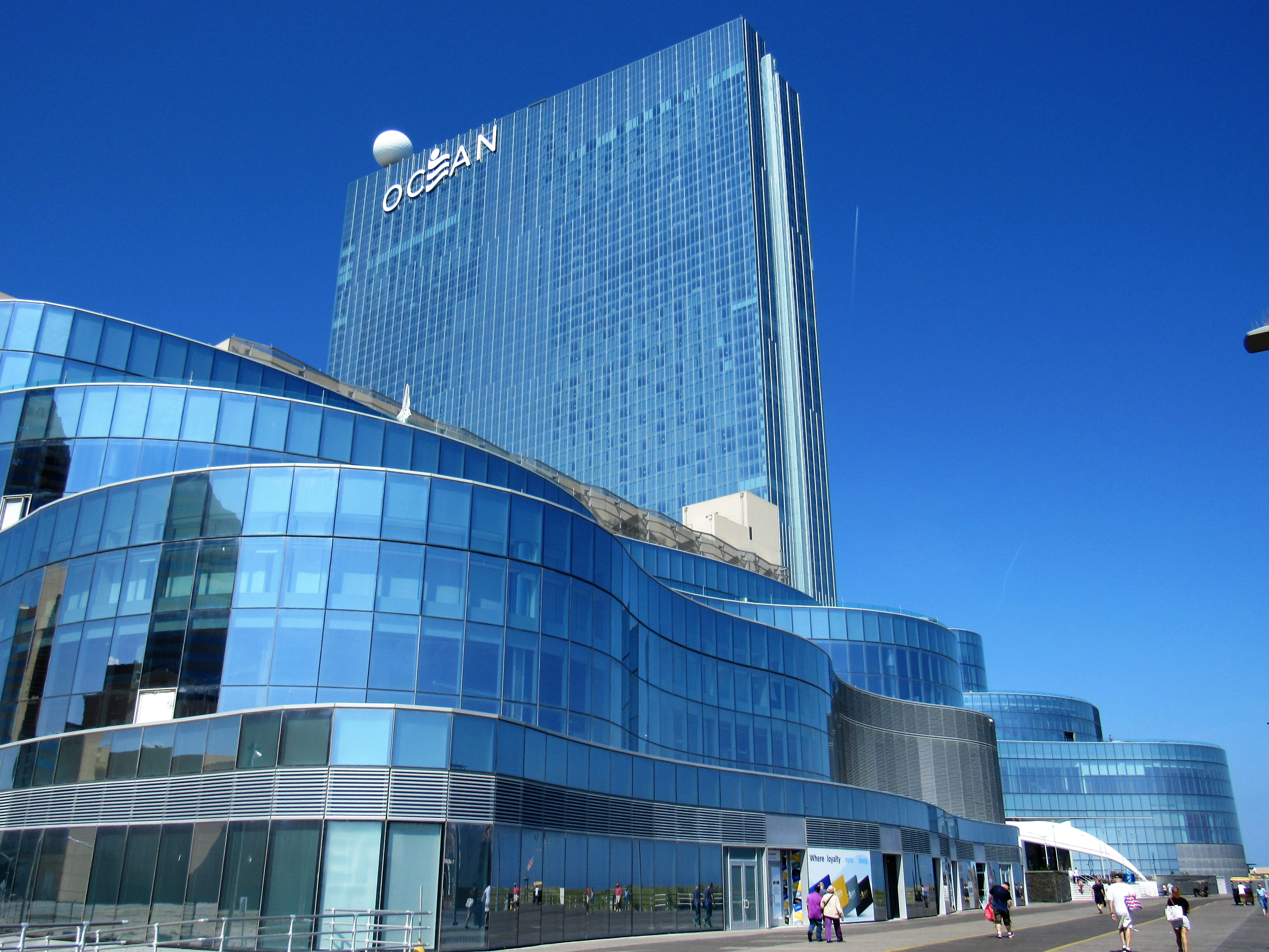
The Ocean Casino Resort is the newest resort in Atlantic City.

Atlantic City has historically been the second largest gambling city in the US after Las Vegas. Atlantic City features nine integrated resorts, several of which are located along the famous Atlantic City Boardwalk. New Jersey voters legalized casino gambling in 1976, paving the way for the development of casinos in Atlantic City. Caesars Entertainment operates three of the nine integrated resorts in Atlantic City. MGM Resorts and Hard Rock International also maintain a significant presence in the market.

==== Atlantic City ====
- Bally's Atlantic City
- Borgata
- Caesars Atlantic City
- Golden Nugget Atlantic City
- Hard Rock Hotel & Casino Atlantic City
- Harrah's Atlantic City
- Ocean Casino Resort
- Resorts Casino Hotel
- Tropicana Atlantic City

=== New York ===
The state of New York is home to three integrated resorts, all of which are located upstate. Three new integrated resorts will open in New York City after three projects there were awarded full casino licenses.

- Resorts World Catskills
- Seneca Niagara Casino & Hotel
- Turning Stone Resort Casino

==== New York City ====
- Bally's New York (Opening 2030)
- Hard Rock Hotel & Casino Metropolitan Park (Opening 2030)
- Resorts World New York City (Expansion Opening 2030)

=== Oklahoma ===
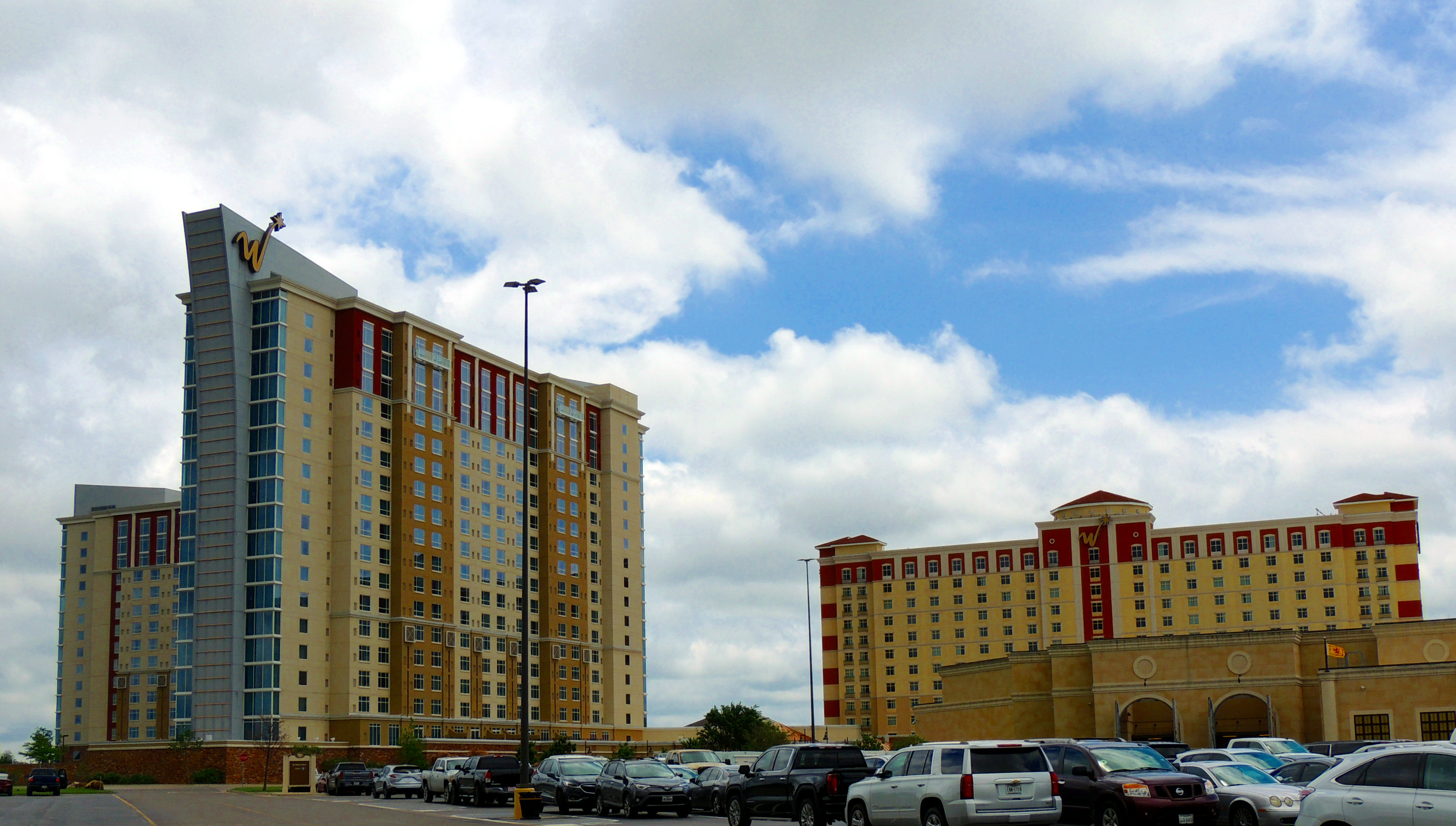
The WinStar World Casino in Thackerville, Oklahoma has the largest casino in the world.

Oklahoma is home to many Native American tribes. As a result, a large number of Native American casinos exist in the state. Amongst these casinos, the state is home to two integrated resorts, including the largest casino in the world.

- Choctaw Casinos & Resorts
- WinStar World Casino

== See also ==
- List of casino hotels
- List of casinos
- List of largest hotels
- List of convention and exhibition centers
- Entertainment Complex Bill
