= Melco International Development =

Casino and hospitality business holding company

Melco International Development Limited
- Native name: 新濠國際發展有限公司
- Formerly: The Macao Electric Lighting Company Limited
- Company type: Listed company
- Traded as: SEHK: 200
- Industry: Consumer discretionary – travel, leisure
- Genre: Entertainment, leisure, other
- Founded: 1910; 116 years ago in British Hong Kong
- Headquarters: Central, Hong Kong, China
- Area served: Hong Kong, Macau, Philippines, Cyprus
- Key people: Lawrence Ho (Chairman and CEO); Evan Winkler (President and Managing Director)
- Brands: Mocha Club, Nüwa, City of Dreams, The House of Dancing Water, Studio City, Altira Macau
- Subsidiaries: Melco Resorts & Entertainment Limited
- Website: www.melco-group.com

Melco International Development Limited, formerly The Macao Electric Lighting Company Limited, is a multinational investment holding company based in Central, Hong Kong. Melco International invests in casino and hospitality business and other businesses in Hong Kong, Macau, the Philippines, and Cyprus. One of the 100 oldest companies in Hong Kong, it was founded in 1910 and listed on the Hong Kong Stock Exchange in 1927. Originally an electricity supplier to Macau, around 2001 Melco International diversified into casino development and operations, building casino resorts such as Studio City Macau, City of Dreams Macau, City of Dreams Manila, and Altira Macau. Currently the major subsidiary that Melco International operates is Melco Resorts & Entertainment Limited.

== History ==
=== 1910–1987 – Macao Electric Lighting ===
The legacy company of Melco International Development Limited, the Macao Electric Lighting Company, Limited (MELCO), was incorporated in 1910. The company was among the first 100 companies established in Hong Kong and the first company to supply power to Macao. The company was listed on the Hong Kong Stock Exchange in 1927.

=== 1988–2004 – Melco International ===
The Macao Electric Lighting Company, Limited was renamed Melco International Development Limited (Melco International) in 1988. In 1993, Melco International became a subsidiary of Shun Tak Holdings and acquired Aberdeen Restaurant Enterprises Limited, which owned the Jumbo Floating Restaurant and Tai Pak Floating Restaurant in Aberdeen, Hong Kong. Melco International ceased to be a subsidiary of Shun Tak Holdings in 1996. Lasting Legend Limited became Melco International's single largest shareholder in 2001 and Lawrence Ho became Melco International's managing director. In 2002, Melco International acquired the natural gas supplier Tongda Energy. Also renovating its Jumbo restaurant brand, Melco International expanded into finances and technology with stakes in companies such as iAsia Technology Limited, which was renamed as Value Convergence Holdings Limited. In 2003, Value Convergence together with its units VC CEF Capital, VC CEF Brokerage and VC CEF Futures became Melco International's subsidiaries, which were subsequently disposed of in 2009.

Melco International's Mocha Clubs, opened in 2003, helped introduce "cafe-style slot-machine parlors" to Macau, which were uncommon at the time. Melco completed the acquisition of Mocha Slot Group Limited in 2004. After opening its Macau headquarters in 2003, the following year Melco International opened offices in Beijing, Shanghai, Shenzhen and Manila. In 2004, Melco International acquired a 50% stake in Altira Macau.

=== 2004–2014 – Integrated resorts ===
Melco International formed a joint venture with Publishing and Broadcasting Limited (PBL), an Australian casino operator, in November 2004. With Lawrence Ho and PBL's chief executive James Packer appointed co-chairmen, the venture was breaking ground on a new casino project in Macau by December 2004. Melco International's profit increased 770% in 2005 to HK$534.2 million, and by 2006 the company had regained profitability. Also in 2006 the joint venture purchased the final available gaming license in Macau from Steve Wynn at US$900 million, announcing a new focus on "Las Vegas-style entertainment" with hotels, serviced apartments, shopping, restaurants, and various kinds of entertainment.

Melco PBL Entertainment was listed on the NASDAQ Global Select Market in 2006. With Melco International retaining a third of the shares, the initial public offering raised US$1.14 billion and ranked as the year's fourth-largest IPO in the United States. Several months later, its Altira Macau resort opened in 2007. In 2008, Melco PBL Entertainment changed its name to Melco Crown Entertainment Limited, or MCE. Melco International was a founding signatory of the Hong Kong Corporate Governance Charter. Melco International became a member of the Hang Seng Corporate Sustainability Index in 2013. Between April 2013 and April 2014, Melco International's stock rose by half in value in Hong Kong.

=== 2015–2020 – Melco Resorts and listings ===
In May 2016, the company became the single largest shareholder of Melco Crown. In May 2017, Melco Crown ended its partnership with Crown Resorts and became Melco Resorts & Entertainment (MLCO). With Crown's stake purchased for $1.16 billion, Melco International via Melco Resorts at the time owned three resorts in Macau, eight Mocha Clubs, and a resort in the Philippines. In May 2017, Forbes recorded Melco International as having assets of $13.4 billion, 20,548 employees, and a market cap of $2.8 billion. It also ranked fourth on the Forbes list of 2017 Growth Champions. With Lawrence Ho as chairman and chief executive, in October 2018 Melco Resorts filed with the U.S. Securities and Exchange Commission for a spin-off and NYSE listing of its Studio City International Holdings Limited unit. With Melco Resorts owning 60% of Studio City, the press reported the IPO could raise as much as HK$2.8 billion, with Melco Resorts to remain majority shareholder. Melco Resorts continues to be listed on the NASDAQ Global Select Market.

As an investment holding company, Melco International Development Limited currently has investments in Hong Kong, China, Cyprus, and the Philippines. Active Melco International subsidiaries beyond Melco Resorts include Entertainment Gaming Asia, Inc., which focuses on social gaming platform development businesses. In 2019, Melco International listed revenues of HK$45 billion, with profits of HK$1.8 billion.

== Major subsidiary ==
=== Melco Resorts & Entertainment Limited ===
Melco Resorts & Entertainment (Melco Resorts) operates as a subsidiary of Melco International, which owns 51.2% of the shares. Referred to as Melco PBL Holdings until 2008 and Melco Crown Entertainment until 2017, the division owns the Mocha Clubs gaming cafe business and several casino resorts, including City of Dreams Macau, Altira Macau, Studio City Macau and City of Dreams Manila. As of 2016, the subsidiary's holdings included 3,000 hotel rooms, 60 food outlets, and 16,000 staff. Melco Resorts operates several subsidiaries in localized markets such as Cotai, Macau, and the Philippines. In Cyprus, Melco Resorts operates through the subsidiary ICR Holdings, which in turn consists of subsidiaries such as Integrated Casino Resorts Cyprus Limited and ICR Cyprus Resort Development Co. Limited.

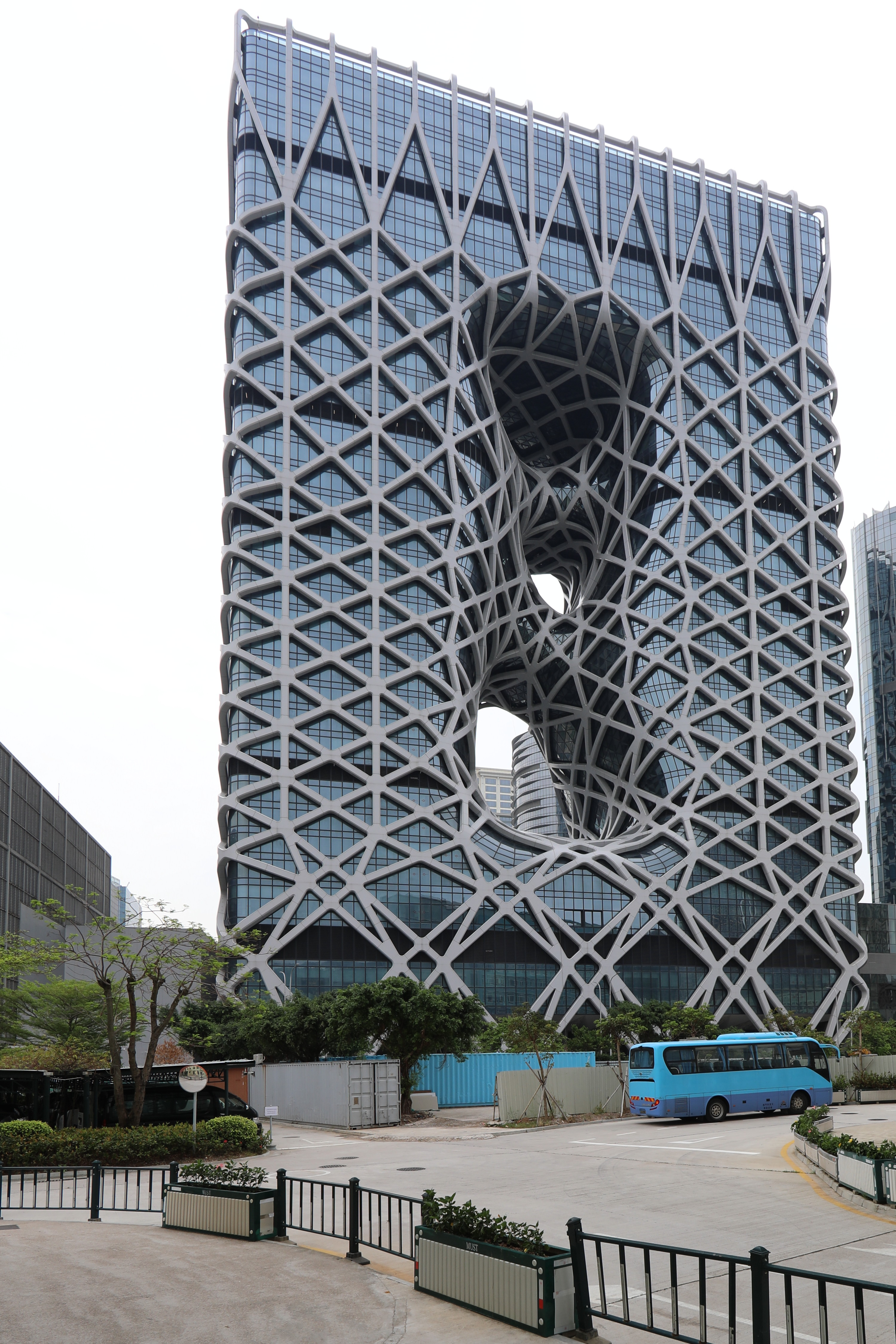
In June 2018, Melco Resorts & Entertainment opened Morpheus, a $1.1 billion hotel tower designed by Zaha Hadid.

The first iteration of Melco Resorts was formed in 2004 as a joint venture between Melco and Publishing & Broadcasting Limited (PBL). In September 2006, the PBL-Melco venture spent US$900 million purchasing the last of Macau's six gaming licenses from Wynn Resorts, allowing for the operation of "an unlimited number of casinos, tables and machines in Macau until June 2022." In May 2007, the venture launched the casino resort Altira Macau (Crown Macau) in Taipa for $1.45 billion. Melco Crown then launched City of Dreams Macau in 2009 for $2.4 billion, with Melco PBL owning 66% of the development and appointing Hyatt International to operate two hotels at the location. The following year, City of Dreams Macau's House of Dancing Water attraction became "the most popular" show in Macao.

On December 7, 2011, Melco Crown was listed on the Hong Kong Stock Exchange's main board. The following year, Melco Crown acquired a majority share of Manchester International Holdings Unlimited Corporation, which was listed on the Philippine Stock Exchange. Melco Crown began working on a new resort in 2012, the $1 billion casino resort City of Dreams Manila. In 2015, Melco Crown opened its $3.2 billion Studio City Macau resort after acquiring a 60% interest in the Hollywood-themed development in 2011. Melco Crown had invested US$6.5 billion in Macau by July 2016, with Melco Crown receiving the CSR Gold Award at Business Awards of Macau in 2013 and 2017. In June 2017 the Cyprus government awarded the project company led by Melco group the first and only casino license in the country, granting a term of 30 years with exclusivity for 15 years. In September 2017, Melco International subsequently obtained a majority stake in the City of Dreams Mediterranean Casino project, which is composed of up to four satellite casino premises in the country.

After Japanese lawmakers pushed for legalized gambling in integrated resorts, by 2017 Melco Resorts & Entertainment was bidding for one of an expected three licenses. In 2018 Melco Resorts opened Morpheus, a $1.1 billion hotel tower designed by Zaha Hadid, at City of Dreams Macau. In the spring of 2018, Melco Resorts revealed its Macau resorts would rely on databases instead of junket operators to market to VIP visitors.

== List of developments ==
Melco International's major holdings include:

- Altira Macau (Macau)
- City of Dreams Macau (Macau)
  - Morpheus
  - Nüwa
- Studio City Macau (Macau)
- Mocha Clubs (Macau)
- City of Dreams Manila (Philippines)

== See also ==
- List of conglomerates
- List of companies listed on the Hong Kong Stock Exchange
- List of most expensive buildings
