= Casino hotel =

Type of establishment

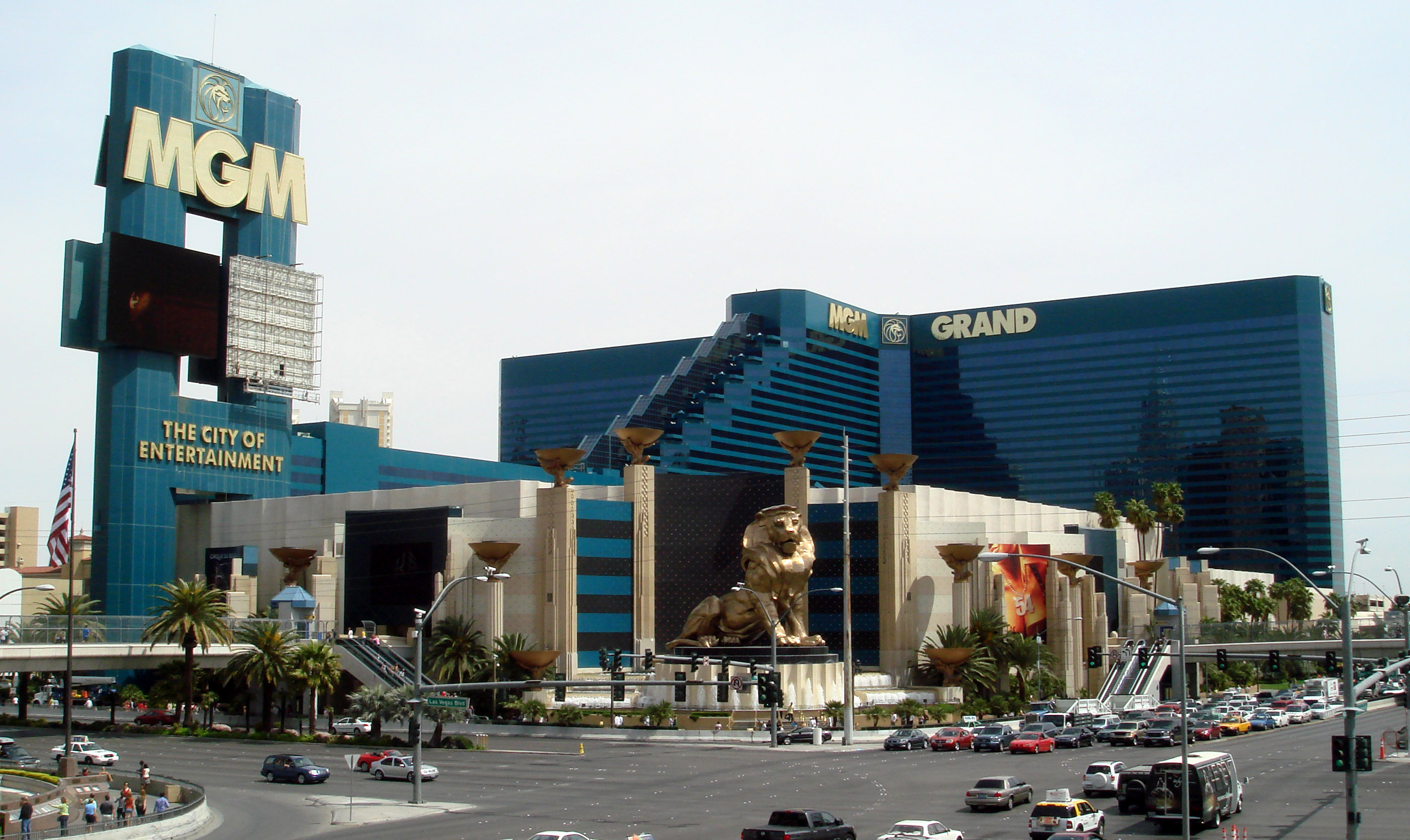
MGM Grand Las Vegas is a casino hotel located on the Las Vegas Strip in Clark County, Nevada

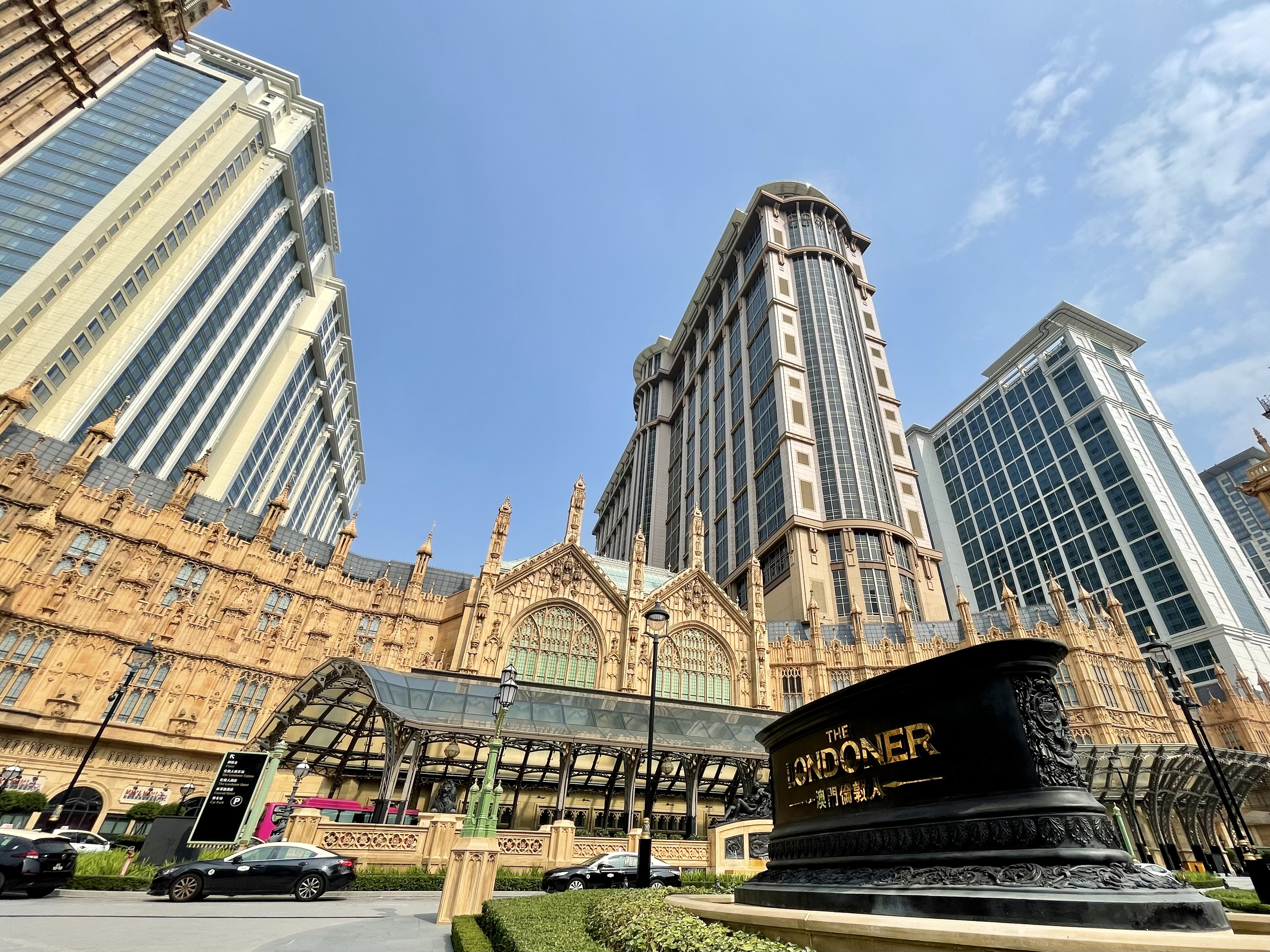
The Londoner Macao is a casino hotel in Macau, China

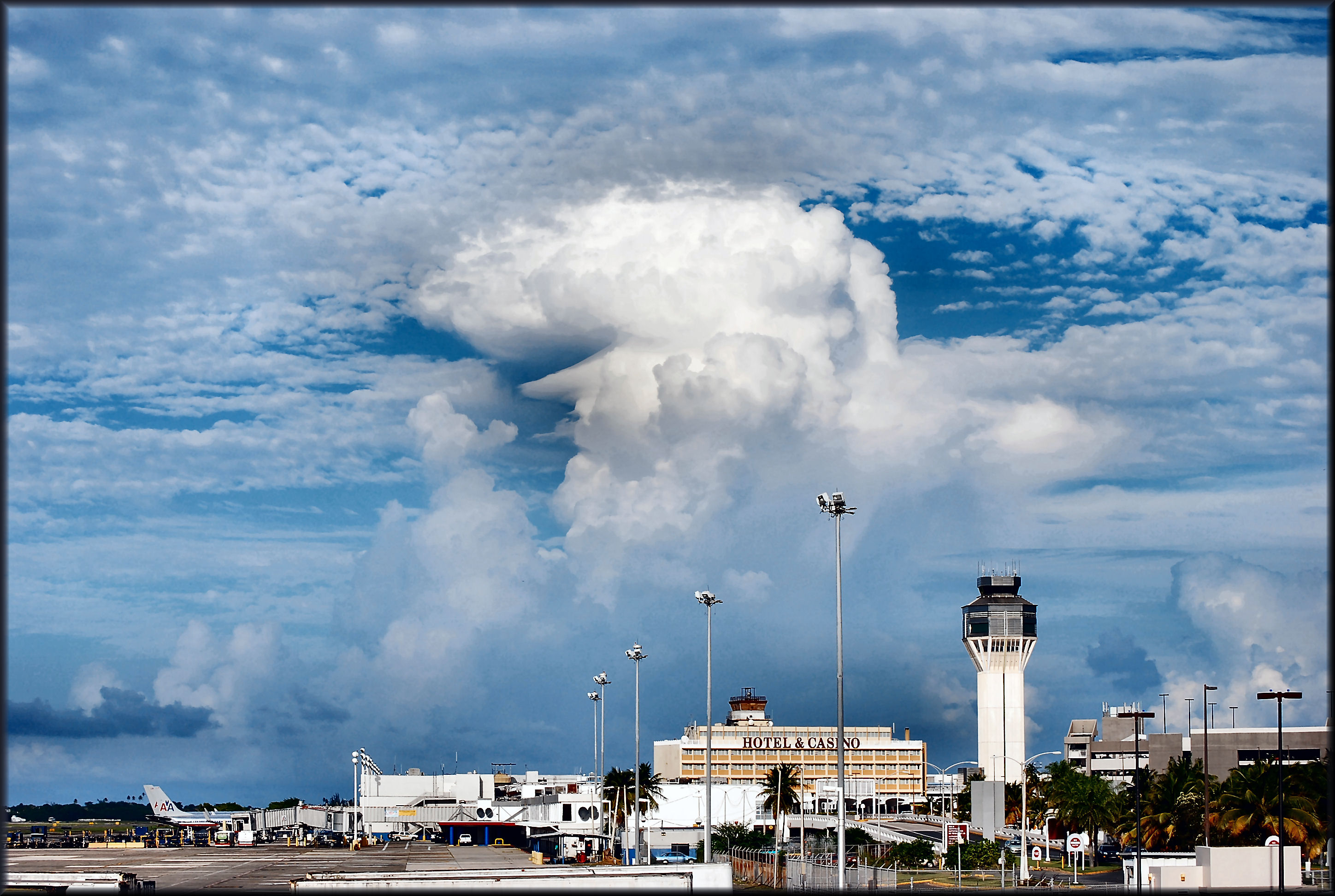
Luis Muñoz Marin International Airport in San Juan, Puerto Rico, features a casino hotel

A casino hotel is an establishment consisting of a casino with temporary lodging provided in an on-premises hotel. Customers receive the benefits of both gambling facilities and lodging. Since the casino and hotel are located on the same premises, a gambler's necessities can be provided for in one location.

The casino may offer common forms of gambling including slot machines, table games, and sports betting. The hotel, nearby or directly connected to the casino, provides lodging and may include other popular services such as food and beverages, valet parking, a swimming pool, health club, and on-site entertainment. Many casino hotels in popular destinations, operate as resort hotels with additional services such as upscale lodgings, ballrooms, and large conference facilities, in which case they may be called integrated resort.

== Integrated resort ==
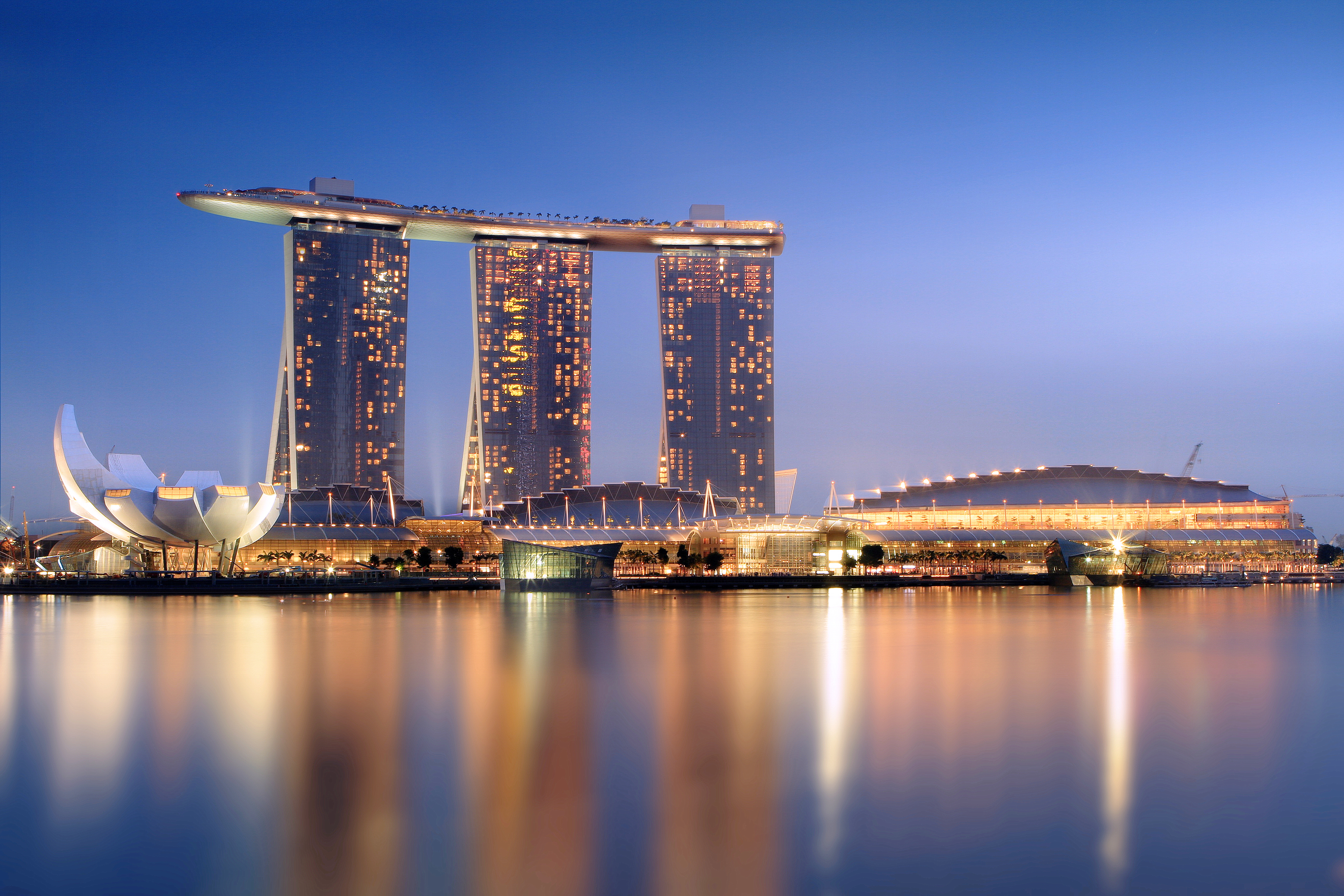
Marina Bay Sands, Singapore

An integrated resort (IR) is a major resort property that includes a hotel and casino, along with convention facilities, entertainment shows, luxury retail, fine dining and possibly theme parks. The term is largely Singaporean and was coined in Singapore. Although the Philippines was the first country in Asia after Macau to grant licenses for IRs through its Entertainment City in the Manila Bay area ahead of Singapore. Earlier IR licenses in Singapore were awarded to Marina Bay Sands and Resorts World Sentosa, which both began operations in early 2010, and were by 2013 the most profitable casinos in the world. The term has come to be widely used in the hospitality industry and by gaming companies such as Las Vegas Sands and Crown Resorts. Outside of Singapore, the term has often been used to describe resorts in Las Vegas, Macau, the Philippines and Australia. In Thailand, integrated resort is known as entertainment complex and was proposed to be legalized with Entertainment Complex Bill. Reaction to the bill has been mostly negative and the bill was officially withdrawn on 9 July 2025.

== Australia ==
In August 2018, the Queensland government was set to invite investors to register their interest in developing an Integrated Resort Development in the Gold Coast. This comes after a proposed development on the Gold Coast Spit ended on 1 August 2017. In June 2021, the Integrated Resort Development Act 1987 was updated.

== Cyprus ==
The City of Dreams Mediterranean, developed by the Integrated Casino Resorts Cyprus Consortium, is the first integrated resort in Cyprus, and all of Europe. It was expected to launch in 2021, and is currently open.

== Japan ==
On 20 July 2018, the Japanese Diet passed a bill allowing the establishment of casinos in three Japanese cities. Under the Integrated Resort Implementation Law, "the casinos will be embedded in family-friendly resorts, partly in a bid to counter their seedy image"; customers are limited to three visits a week; and locals will have to pay an entrance charge of ¥6000, while foreigners can enter for free. The bill "clearly takes a leaf from Singapore's book". MGM Osaka will become the country’s first integrated resort.

== Philippines ==
In 2007, the Philippine Amusement & Gaming Corporation (PAGCOR) opened Entertainment City by the Manila Bay to four integrated resorts.

In 2022, Universal Hotels & Resorts of the Gokongwei-led JG Summit Holdings conglomerate opened the Nustar Resort and Casino integrated resort in Kawit Island of the South Road Properties reclamation area of Cebu City.

== Sri Lanka ==
Cinnamon Life Colombo is South Asia's first integrated resort. The resort consists of an 800 room hotel, 47-storeyed resident tower and convention center with 5,000 seating capacity.

== United States ==
Integrated resorts are common on the Las Vegas Strip and in Atlantic City, New Jersey.

On the Las Vegas Strip, individual casino hotels are large multifunctional complexes: Caesars Palace has nearly 130 000 sq. ft. of casino space and a 4 300-seat Colosseum. At The Venetian, the resort is themed after Venice, and the gondola rides are accompanied by singing gondoliers. Indoor and outdoor gondolas run along the Grand Canal. Casino hotels can be significant employers in an area; in 2009 in Atlantic City, Local 54 of the Hotel Employees and Restaurant Employees Union represented 22,000 casino hotel workers.

== See also ==
- List of casino hotels
- List of integrated resorts
