= Macau Ferry Terminal =

Macau Ferry Terminal, or Macau Ferry Pier, may refer to:

- Outer Harbour Ferry Terminal, a ferry terminal in Macau
- Hong Kong–Macau Ferry Terminal, a ferry terminal in Hong Kong serving ferries to Macau
