= Shane Benis =

- Born: London
- Occupation: Entrepreneur

Shane Benis is an entrepreneur in Shanghai, China. He is the founder and CEO of China Sports Promotions and producer of White Collar Boxing International.

== Early life ==
While born in London, Shane spent most of his childhood in Kampala, Uganda which is where his father originates from.

== Career ==
In 2008, Benis organised the first white collar boxing event in Shanghai China with 300 attendees. In 2011, he opened the Golden Gloves boxing gym in Shanghai. In 2012, he created China Sports Promotions. He organised the first white collar boxing event in Beijing in 2012 with 400 people in attendance. That was followed up with an event in Macao at The Venetian Macao for 720 guests in 2014. The event was attended by boxing personalities such as announcer Michael Buffer and Boxing Hall of Fame Coach Freddy Roach.

In 2015, Benis partnered with online television platform Sohu.com to create the reality television show 'White Collar Boxing'. Only available to watch in China, the show aired over 8 weeks featuring local and expatriate business men and women living in Shanghai.
