= The Londoner Macao =

Casino resort on the Cotai Strip, Macau

- 澳門倫敦人 (Yue Chinese)

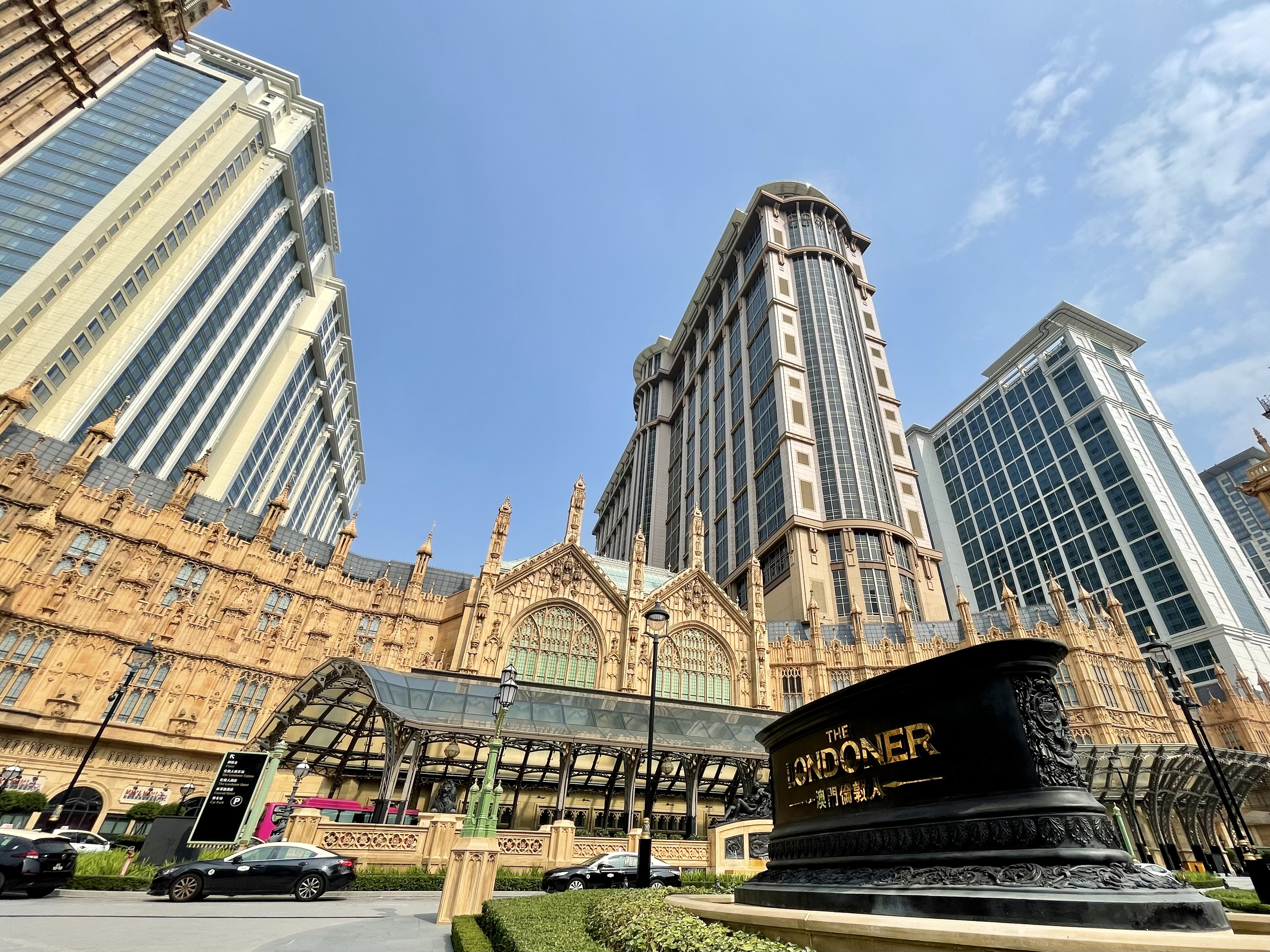

- Location within Macau
- Interactive map of The Londoner Macao
- Location: Macau; Cotai Strip; 22.14579°N 113.56558°E
- Opened: 11 April 2012; 14 years ago
- Theme: London
- No. of rooms: 4,426
- Gaming space: 106,000 sq ft (9,800 m^{2})
- Casino type: Land-based
- Owner: Las Vegas Sands
- Previous names: Cotai Strip parcels 5 and 6
- Website: https://www.londonermacao.com/

The Londoner Macao
- Traditional Chinese: 澳門倫敦人
- Simplified Chinese: 澳门伦敦人
Transcriptions
Standard Mandarin
- Hanyu Pinyin: Àomén Lúndūn Rén
Yue: Cantonese
- Jyutping: ou3 mun4*2 leon4 deon1 jan4

The Londoner Macao (Chinese: 澳門倫敦人) is a casino resort on the Cotai Strip, in Macau. On 5 August 2011, Sands China announced that the $4 billion property, long referred to as parcels five and six, would be officially named Sands Cotai Central (金沙城中心). The first portion of the resort opened on 11 April 2012. The resort was rebranded as The Londoner Macao in 2021. The resort's redesign was completed in May 2023.

== History ==
=== Development and construction ===
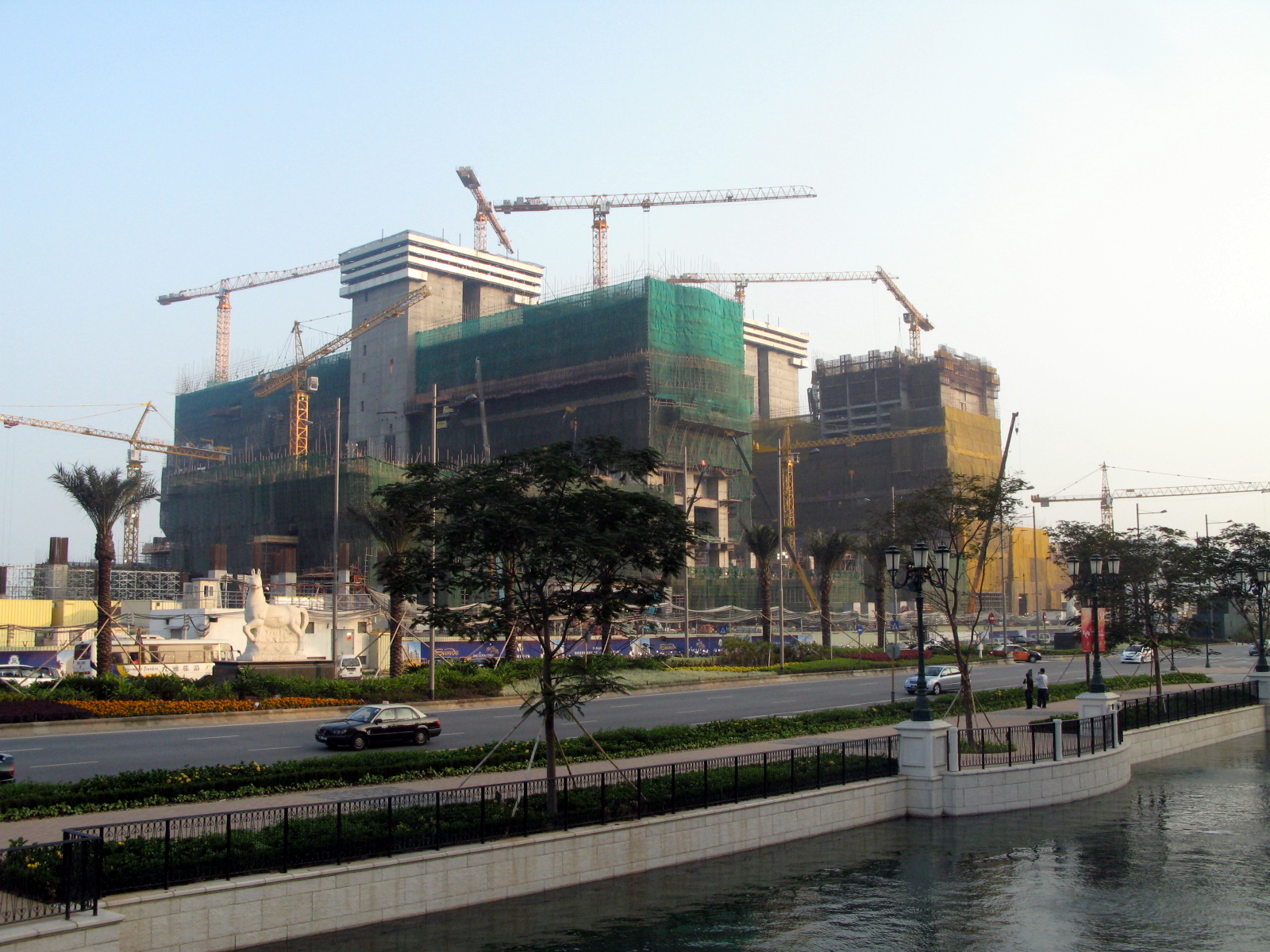
The development under construction in 2007, five years before opening.

Architecture firm Aedas was the lead architect for all Las Vegas Sands projects on the Cotai Strip. The firm employed local companies for developing, coordinating and implementing the design. The main contractor was Hsin Chong Construction Group Limited.

In November 2005, Las Vegas Sands announced a deal with Shangri-La Hotels and Resorts for them to manage one hotel tower in the complex, with 500 rooms under their luxury Shangri-La brand and 1,000 rooms under their business-class Traders Hotels brand.

In February 2006, Las Vegas Sands announced a deal with Starwood Hotels to operate two hotel towers in the complex under their Sheraton Hotels brand and a third hotel tower under their luxury St. Regis Hotels brand.

Construction of the project was slowed and complicated in part by government restrictions on how many foreign workers could be hired in the labor-starved territory. According to the main contractor: "Work started in 2006 but the project went through a period of suspension due to the 2008 financial crisis. During this period, work on the project came to a complete stop and it was quite a challenge to restart the project. Staff had to be recruited and contractors engaged. Over 130 contractors were involved in the project. The imported labour quota restrictions have also been challenging."

The number of gaming tables at the resort was a thorny issue as well, since the local government imposed a cap on tables until 2013. The company stated in early August 2011 that Sands Cotai Central would have up to 530 tables versus the 670 it was planning previously.

On 24 March 2011, Las Vegas Sands announced it had terminated its management agreement with Shangri-La Hotels and Resorts . Then, on 5 August 2011, Sands China announced that they had signed franchise deals with Hilton Worldwide and InterContinental Hotels to replace Shangri-La and brand over 1,800 rooms at Cotai site 5 and 6 under Hilton's luxury Conrad Hotels brand and InterContinental's Holiday Inn brand.

In addition, on 5 August 2011 the company also announced that the resort complex would officially be named Sands Cotai Central. The resort would include over 6,000 rooms and suites, two casinos, more than 300,000 square feet (28,000 m^{2}) of meeting space, and 11 food and beverage establishments. It would total 106,000-square-foot (9,800 m^{2}) of gaming area and 13,700,000-square-foot (1,270,000 m^{2}) of non-gaming facilities.

=== Opening ===
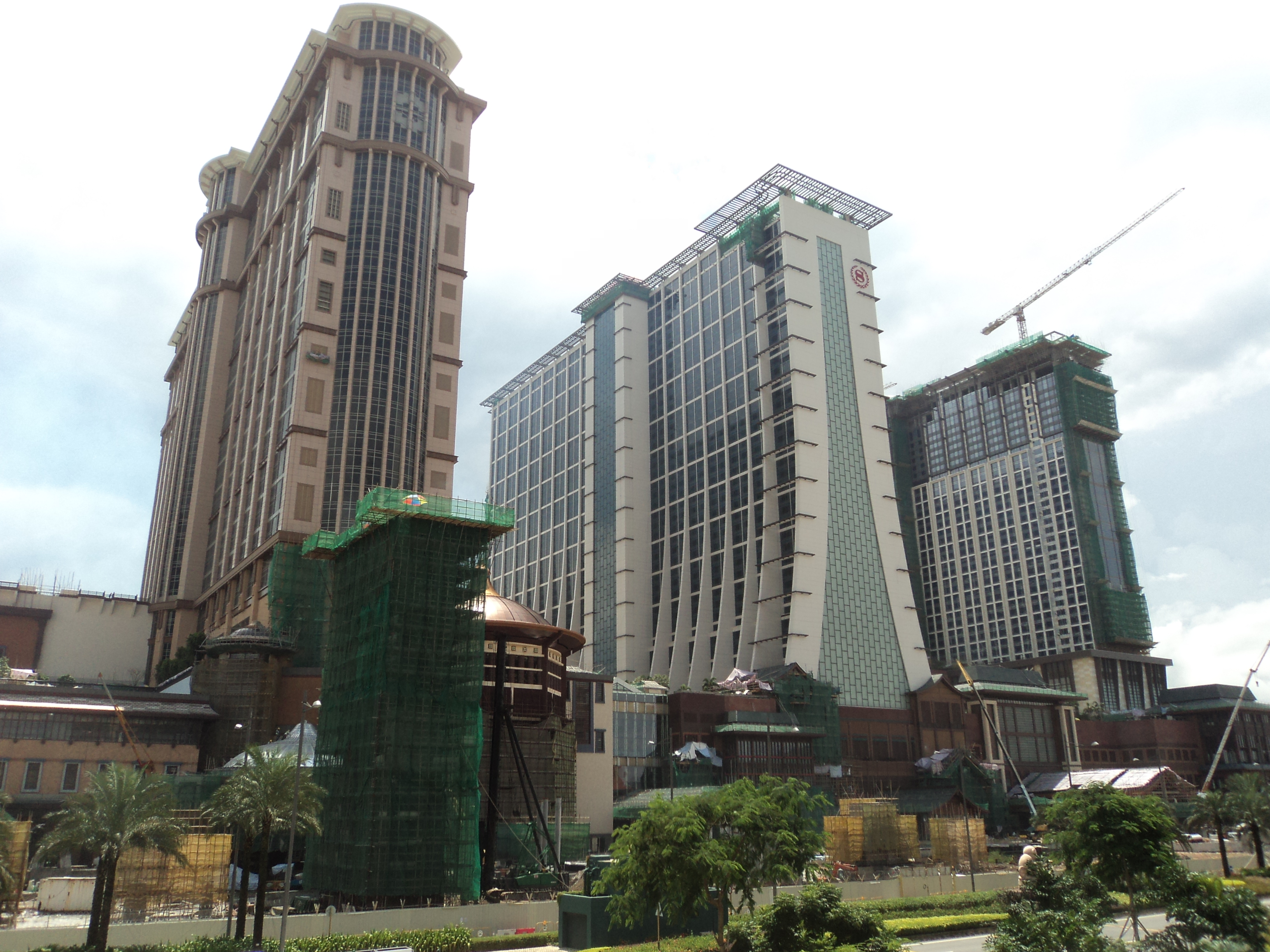
The 3 original hotel towers. From left to right: Conrad/Holiday Inn tower and two Sheraton Towers.

The resort complex opened on April 11th, 2012, featuring the four-star Holiday Inn Macao, Cotai Central, the world's largest Holiday Inn, with more than 1,200 rooms, and the five-star Conrad Macao, Cotai Central, with more than 600 rooms.

The opening ceremony was announced as "Asia's Biggest Launch Party in 2012." It was marked by the feat of high wire walker Jade Kindar-Martin and his wife Karine Mauffrey, traversing the 525 meter (1,700 feet) distance between the top of the Venetian and the new Conrad Hotel, whilst balancing 150 meters (500 feet) above the ground on a wire less than 1 inch (25 mm) thick. The spectacle was accompanied by the China National Symphony Orchestra.

The second phase, consisting of the twin-towered five-star Sheraton Macao Hotel, Cotai Central, opened on 20 September 2012. The 4,001-room Sheraton was both the largest hotel in Macau and the largest Sheraton in the world.

The third phase, The St. Regis Macao, Cotai Central and branded residences, opened on 17 December 2015, as the fourth tower of the Sands Cotai Central.

On 18 January 2016, the Sheraton Macao Hotel, Cotai Central was upgraded to the brand's premium Sheraton Grand tier and renamed Sheraton Grand Macao Hotel, Cotai Central.

=== Rebranding ===
In 2017, Las Vegas Sands announced plans to renovate Sands Cotai Central with a London theme and rebrand it as The Londoner Macao, due to disappointing results at the property. The Holiday Inn Macao at Cotal Central closed in 2019 and was overhauled and rebranded as The Londoner Hotel with half the number of rooms, and the "Cotai Central" branding was dropped from the St. Regis, Conrad and Sheraton hotels.

The entire complex was officially rebranded The Londoner Macao on 8 February 2021, when the first phase of the renovated property celebrated its grand opening. The first phase includes the opening of The Londoner Hotel, an all-new Crystal Palace atrium featuring a replica of the Shaftesbury Memorial Fountain, new dining options, and a number of interactive attractions that are themed to London. A British-style exclusive club for guests of The Londoner Hotel, The Residence, also opened its doors as part of Phase 1.

Later phases, progressively completed throughout 2021, includes the Suites by David Beckham situated at the top two floors of The Londoner Hotel, a 370-room Londoner Court, a re-themed and expanded Shoppes at Londoner, and the 6000-seat Londoner Arena. Later phases of the rebranding also saw the completion of the Houses of Parliament facade, a life-sized Big Ben, and a Changing of The Guard show held at the Crystal Palace atrium.

The resort's overall redesign was completed in May 2023 and was marked with a celebration attended by David Beckham, with performances by pianist Lang Lang, Hong Kong pop singer G.E.M., Chinese musical theater performer Ayanga and English singer Jamie Cullum.

In 2024, the two hotel towers under Sheraton branding closed and were renovated, with their 4000 rooms reduced to 2405 rooms, due to the conversion of many rooms into suites. The Sheraton had just 360 suites, while the new property will have 1500 suites. It will be launched under Marriott's Luxury Collection brand as the Londoner Grand, A Luxury Collection Hotel in fall 2024, with one tower, while the second tower will reopen in 2025. The Londoner Grand Casino is being renovated at the same time.

== Hotels in The Londoner Macao ==
Hotels that are part of The Londoner Macao are as follow:

Hotels	No. of Rooms
The Londoner Hotel	594
Suites by David Beckham	594
Conrad Macao	659
St. Regis Macao	400
Londoner Grand	2405
Londoner Court	368

== Macanese firsts ==
Many companies opened their first Macau stores in The Londoner Macao:

- Marks & Spencer - August 2014
- Zara Home - August 2014
- Lady M - July 2018
- Haidilao - October 2019
- The Cheesecake Factory - October 2019
- Taier Sauerkraut Fish - August 2020
- North Palace - December 2020
- The Huaiyang Garden - January 2021
- Shake Shack - April 2021
- The Mews - September 2023
- Gordon Ramsay Pub & Grill - January 2024
- Nusr-Et - planning

== Transportation ==
=== Bus ===
There are several shuttle bus services connecting The Londoner Macao to Macau's major ports of entry and nearby resorts. These shuttle services are provided free of charge.

- The Londoner Macao to Border Gate
- The Londoner Macao to Hengqin Port
- The Londoner Macao to Sands Macao
- The Londoner Macao to Macau International Airport, and Taipa Ferry Terminal
- The Londoner Macao to Macao Ferry Terminal
- The Londoner Macao to HZMB Macau Port
- The Londoner Macao to Macao Central District (Only from Friday to Sunday)

=== Macau Light Rapid Transit ===
The Londoner Macao is within walking distance from both Cotai West Station and Cotai East Station on the Taipa section of the Macau Light Rapid Transit that serves the Cotai Strip and the larger area of Cotai.

== Gallery ==
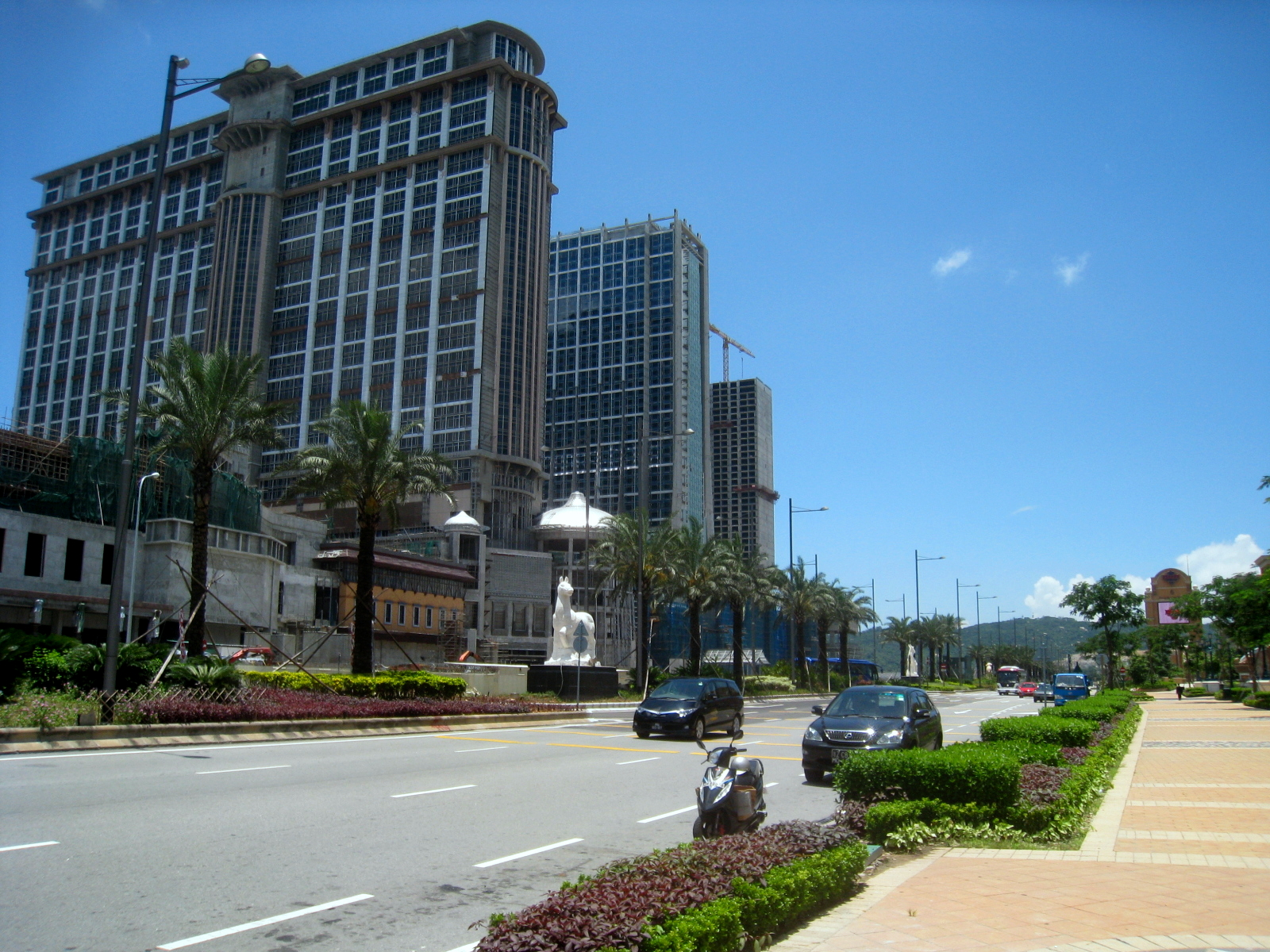
Cotai Strip in 2008

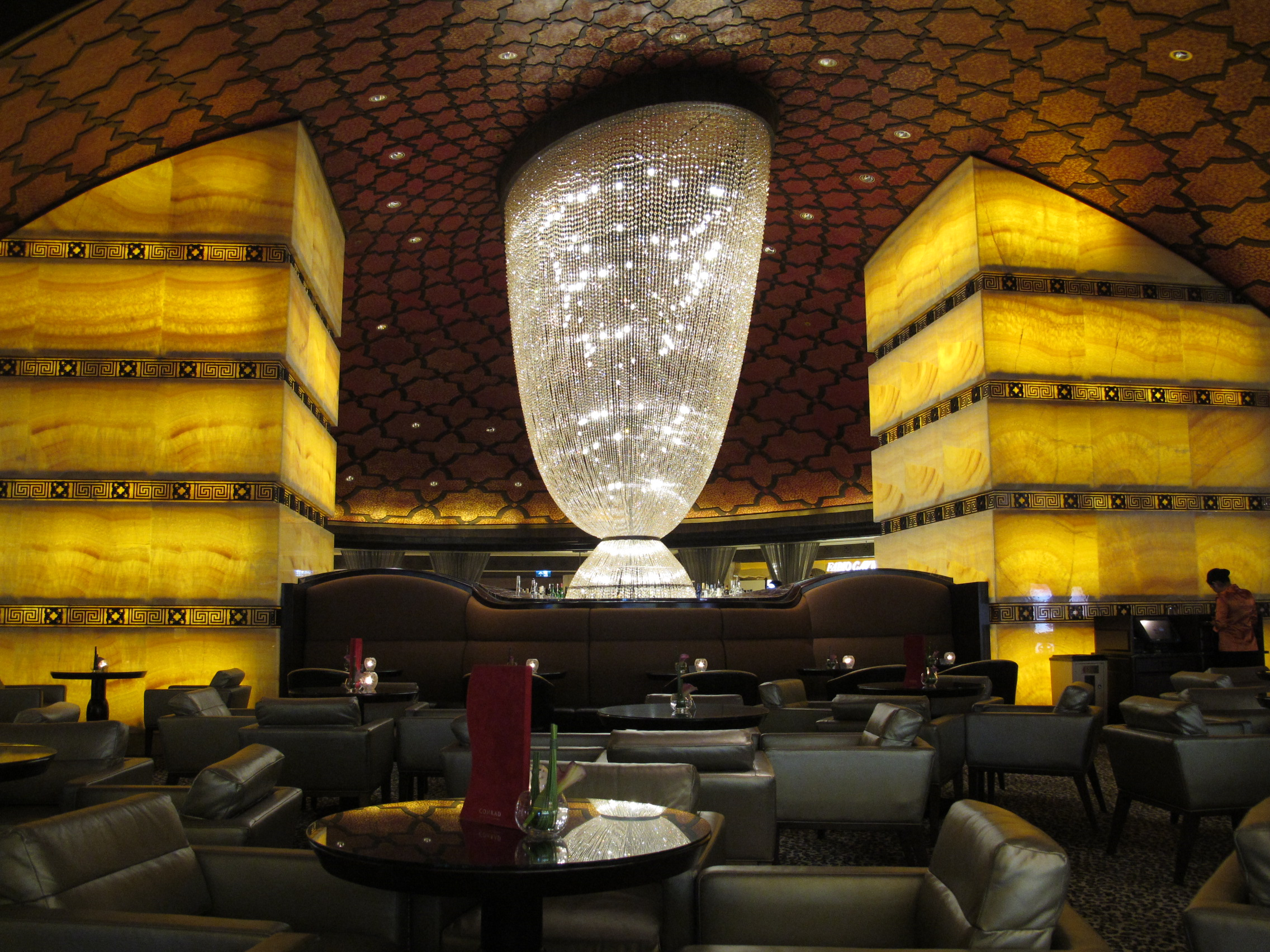
Conrad The Lounge 2013

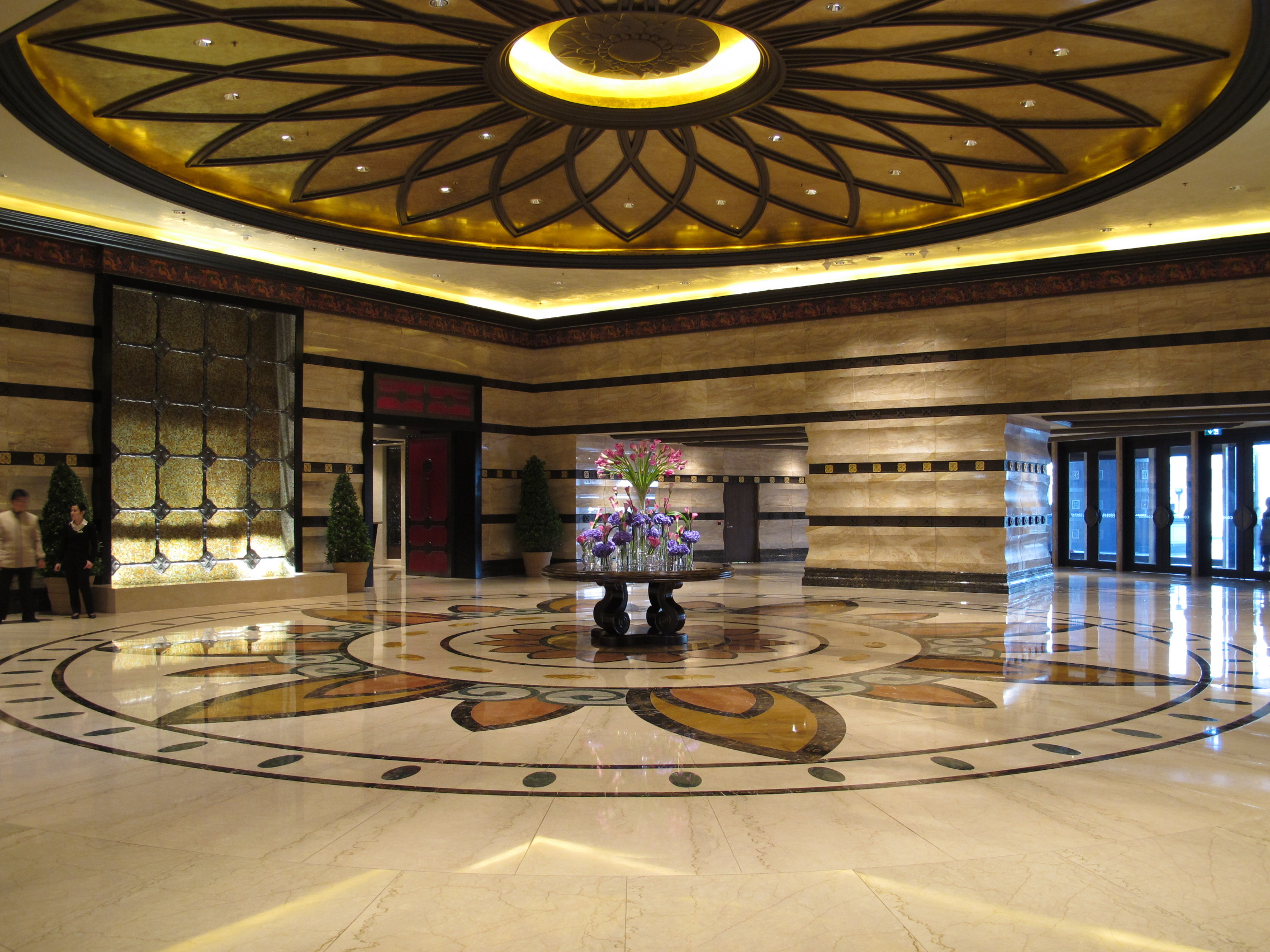
Conrad Macao Lobby 2013

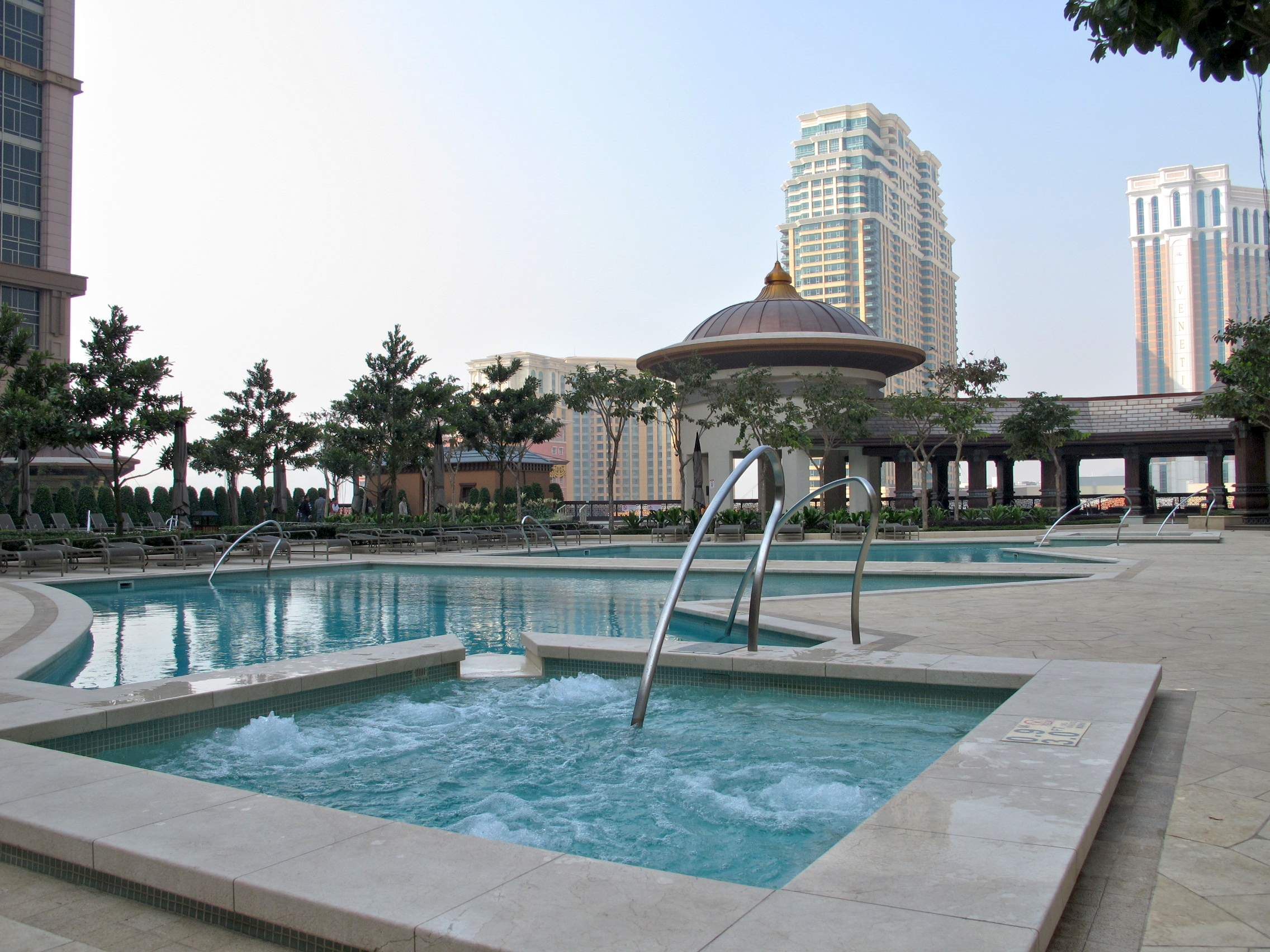
Holiday Inn Macao Swimming Pool

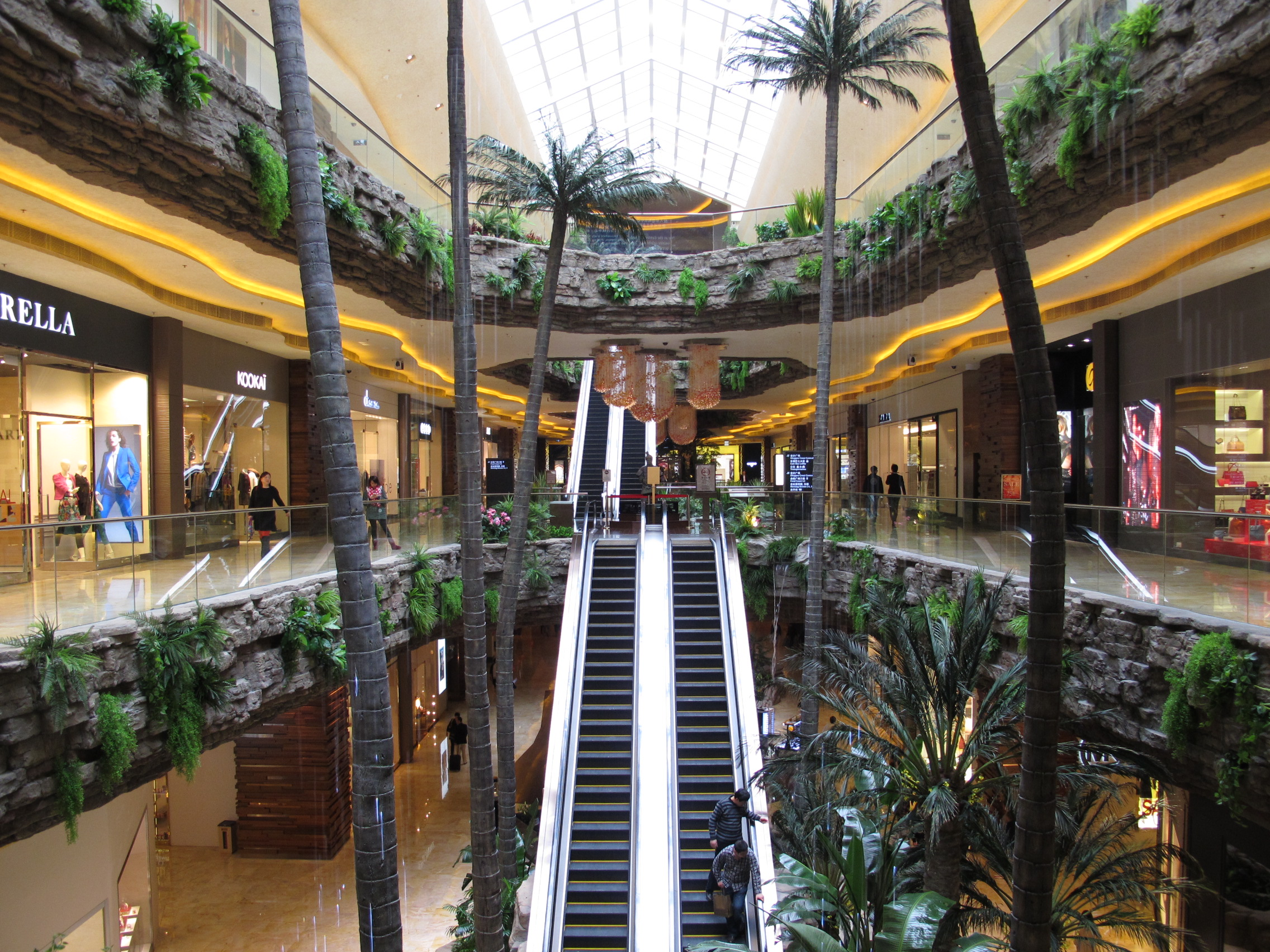
Shoppes at Cotai Central Interior

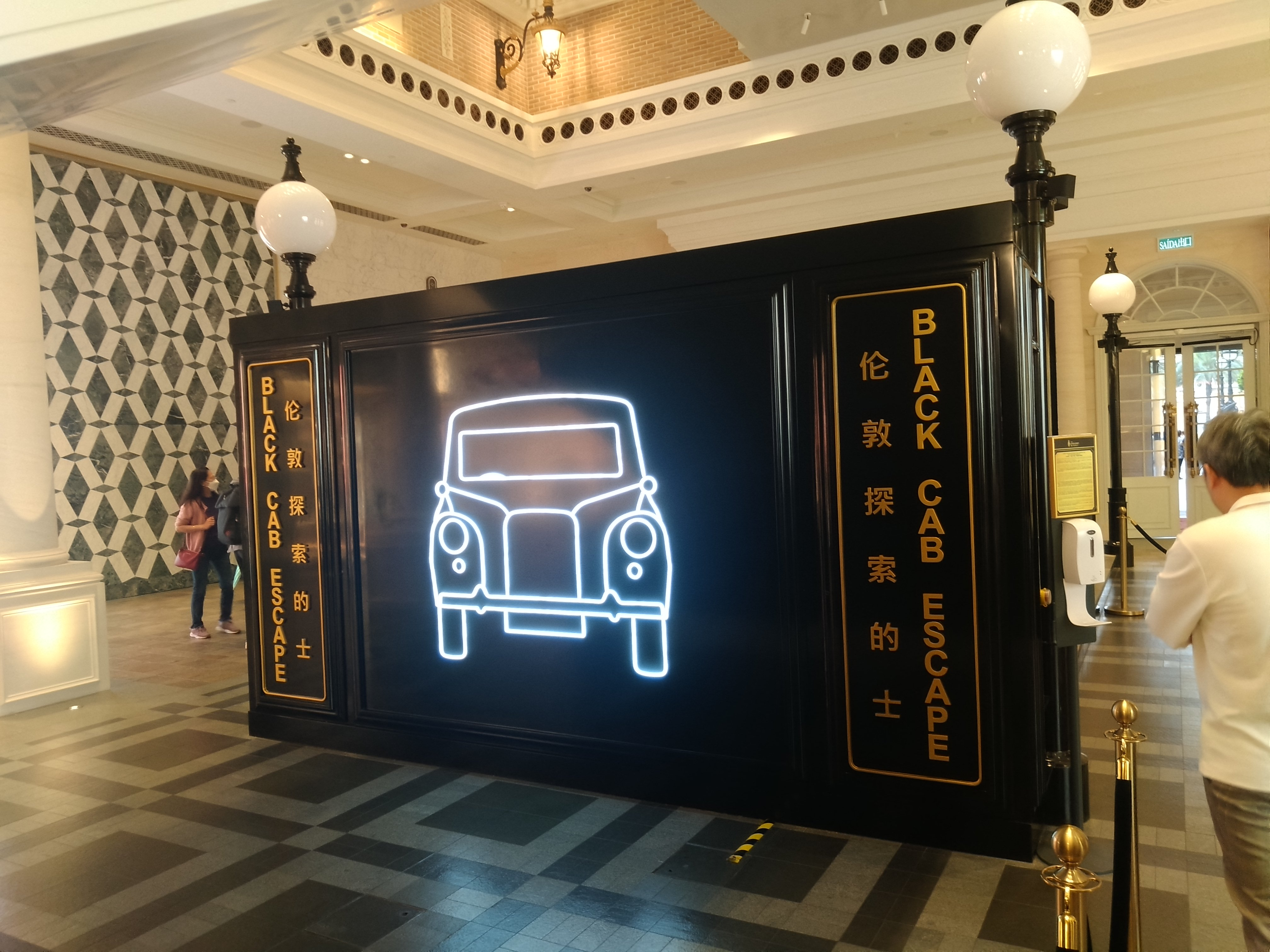
The Black Cab Escape at Londoner Macao

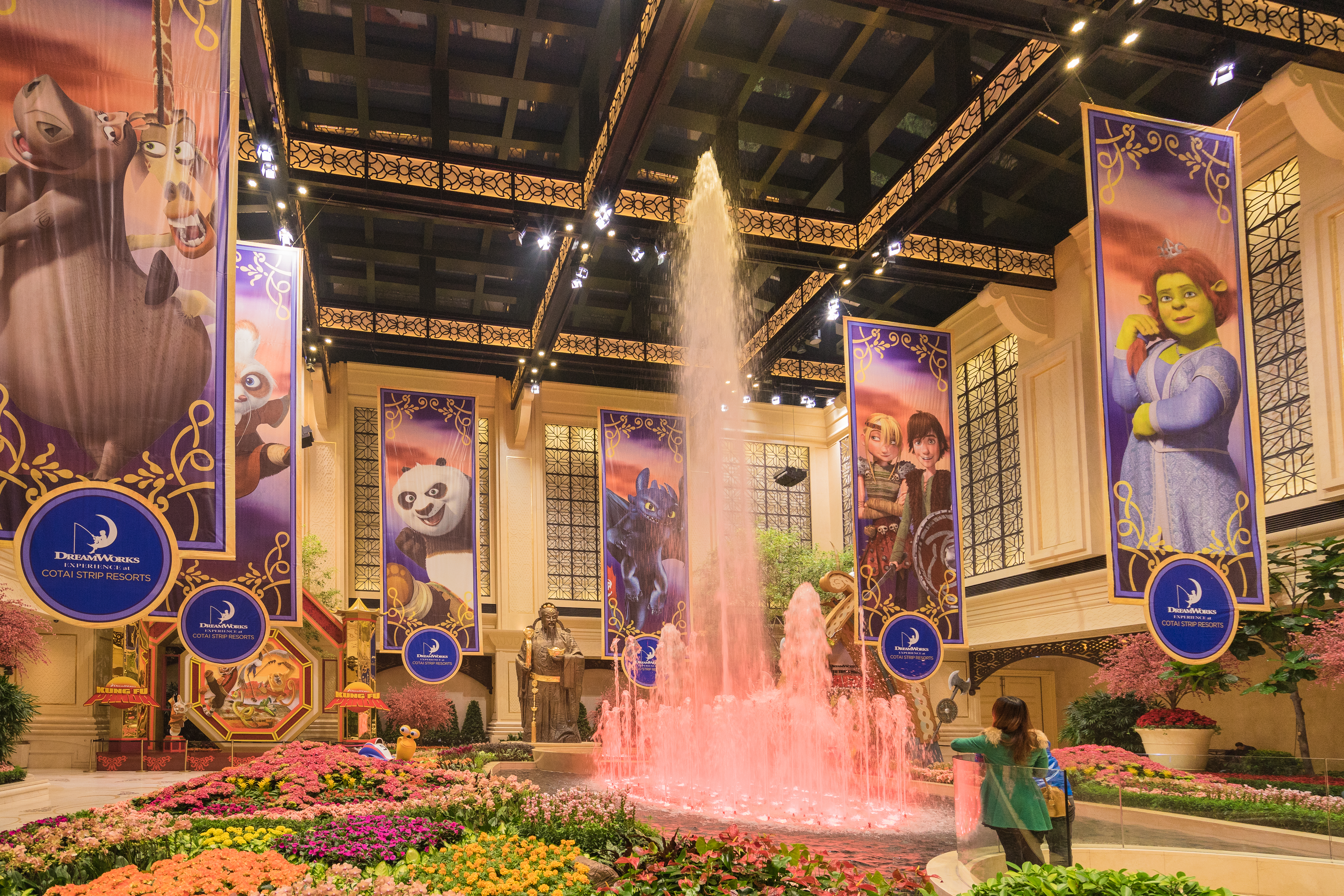
Paradise Garden Sands Cotai Central

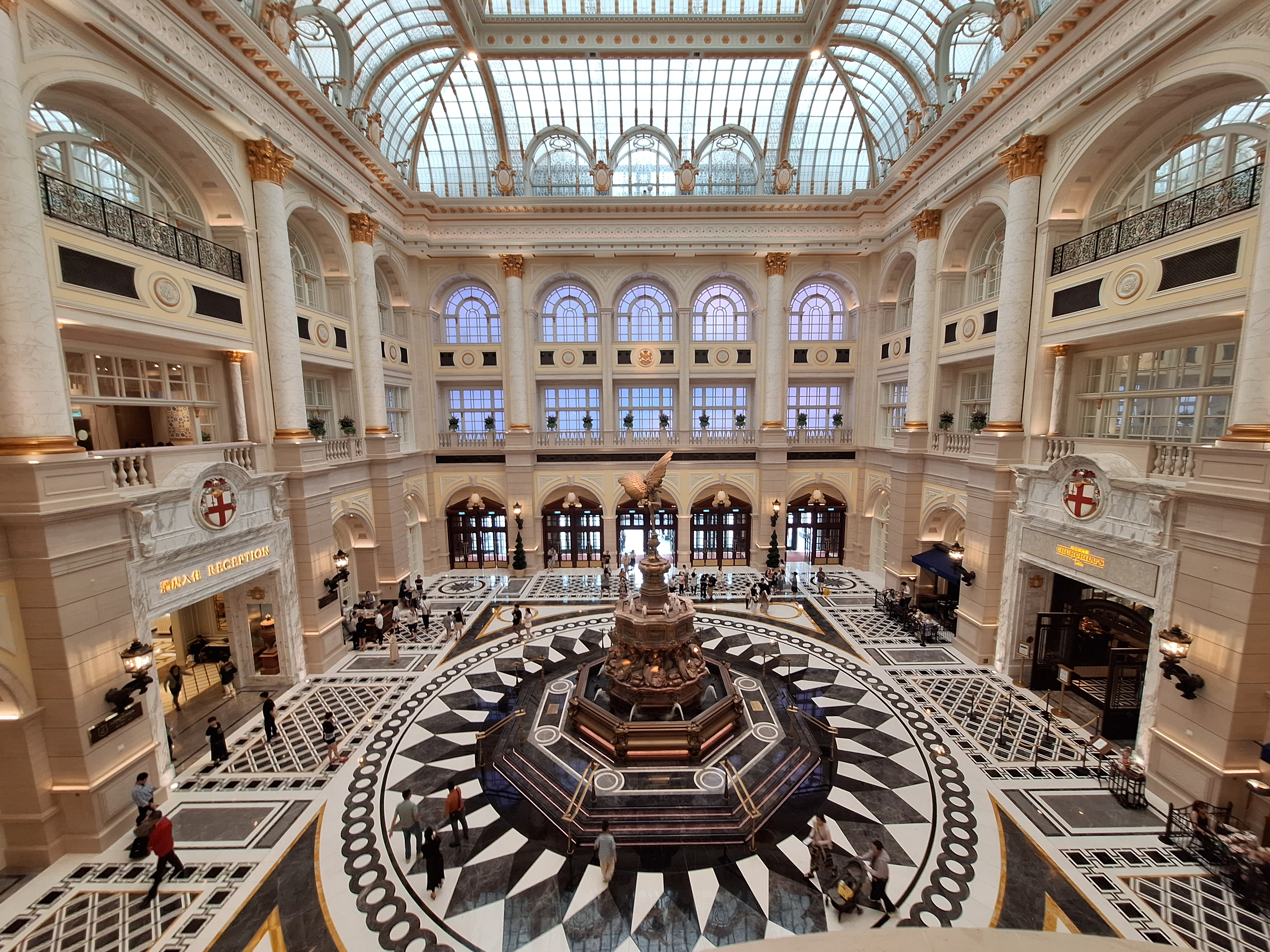
Crystal Palace at Londoner Macao

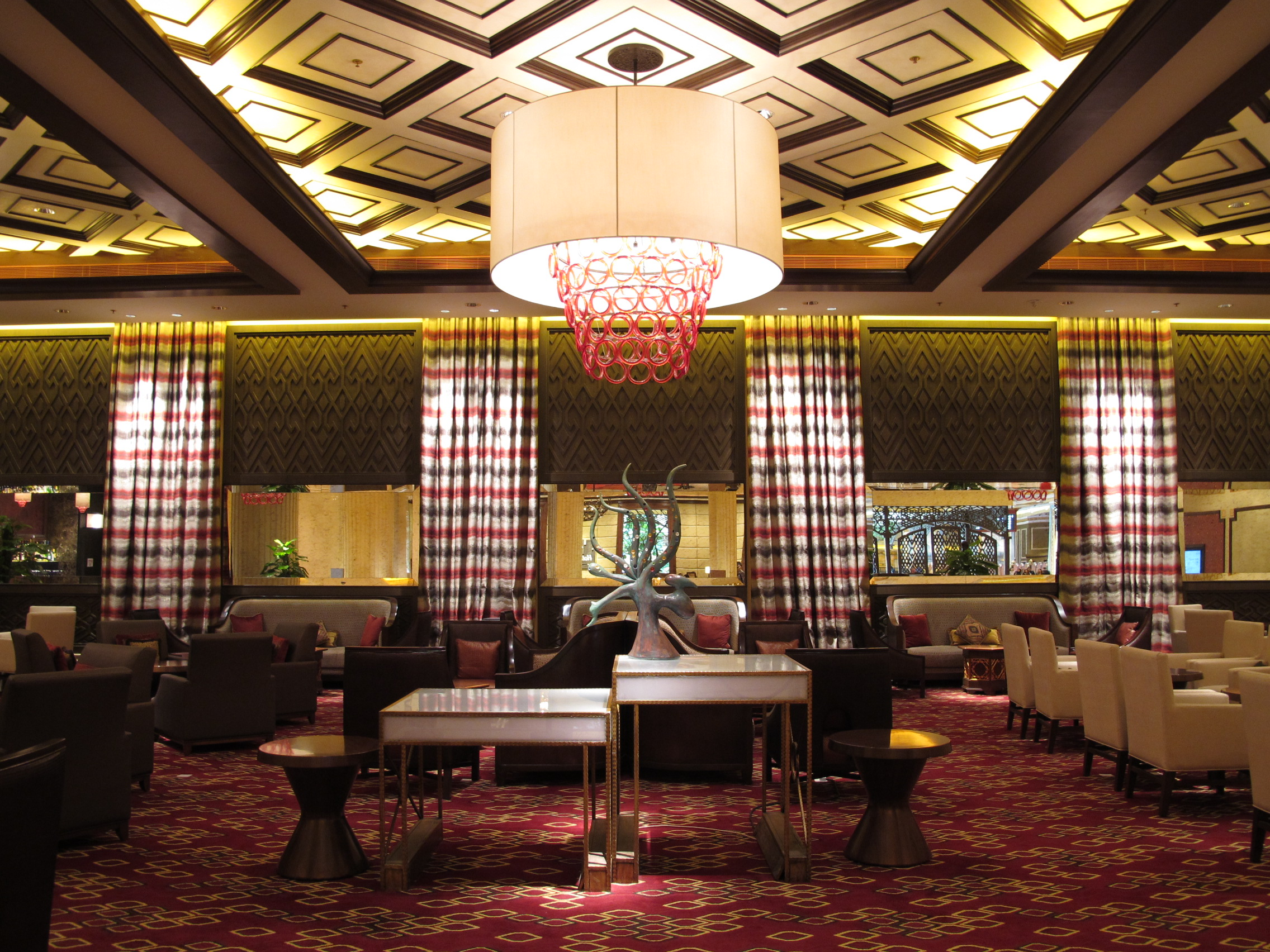
Holiday Inn Macao Lobby Lounge 2013

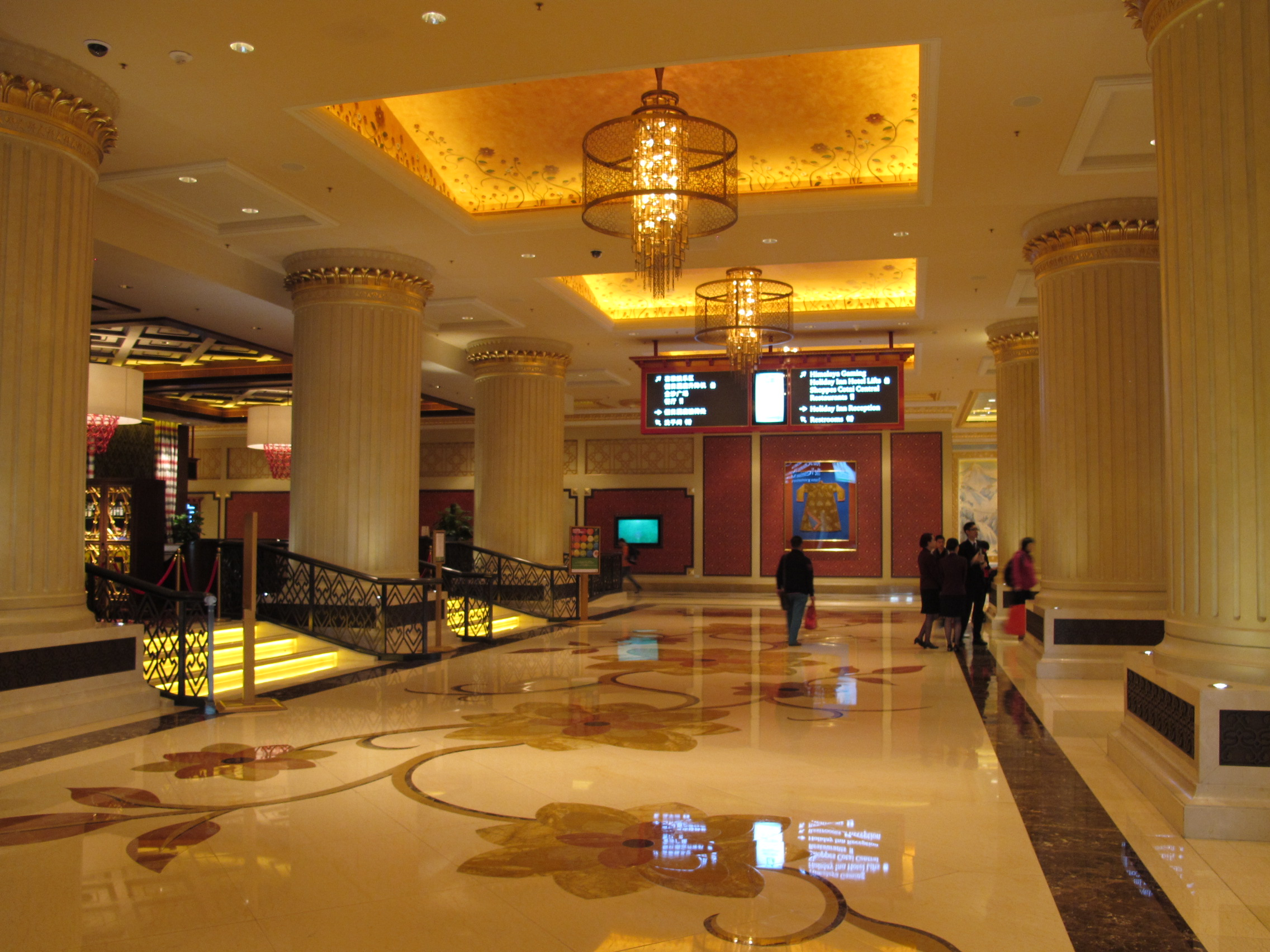
Holiday Inn Macao Lobby 2013

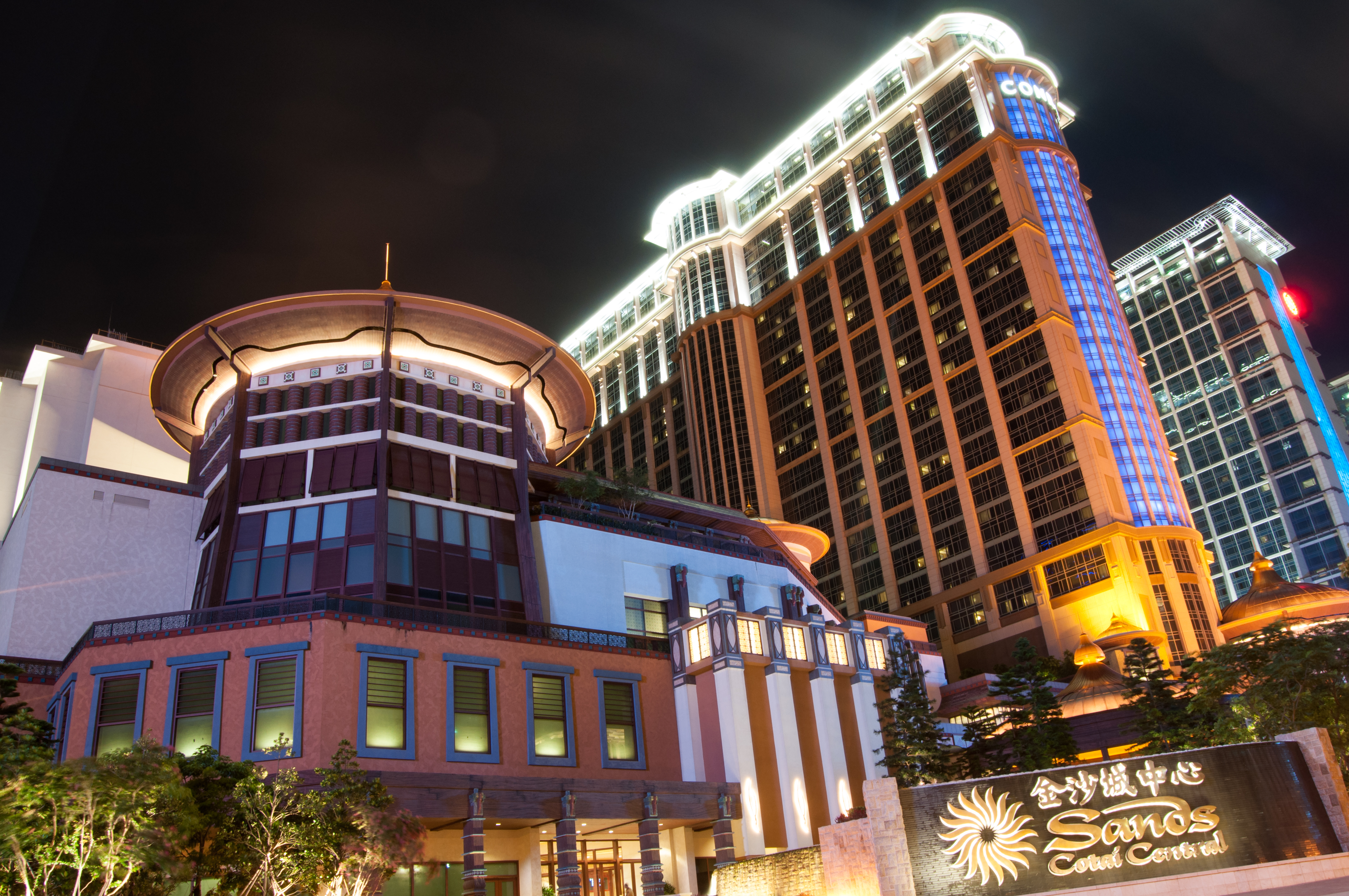
Sands Cotai Central

== See also ==
- Gambling in Macau
- List of properties on the Cotai Strip
- List of Macau casinos
- List of largest hotels
- List of integrated resorts
