= Cotai Water Jet =

Macau ferry operator

Cotai Water Jet 金光飛航 Jacto de Água Cotai
IATA	ICAO	Call sign
8C	—	—
- Founded: 2007
- Commenced operations: 2007
- Hubs: Hong Kong International Airport (Skypier); Taipa Ferry Terminal
- Fleet size: 14
- Destinations: 1 (routes to/from Hong Kong International Airport only)
- Parent company: Las Vegas Sands Corporation
- Headquarters: Macau
- Website: www.cotaiwaterjet.com

Cotai Water Jet
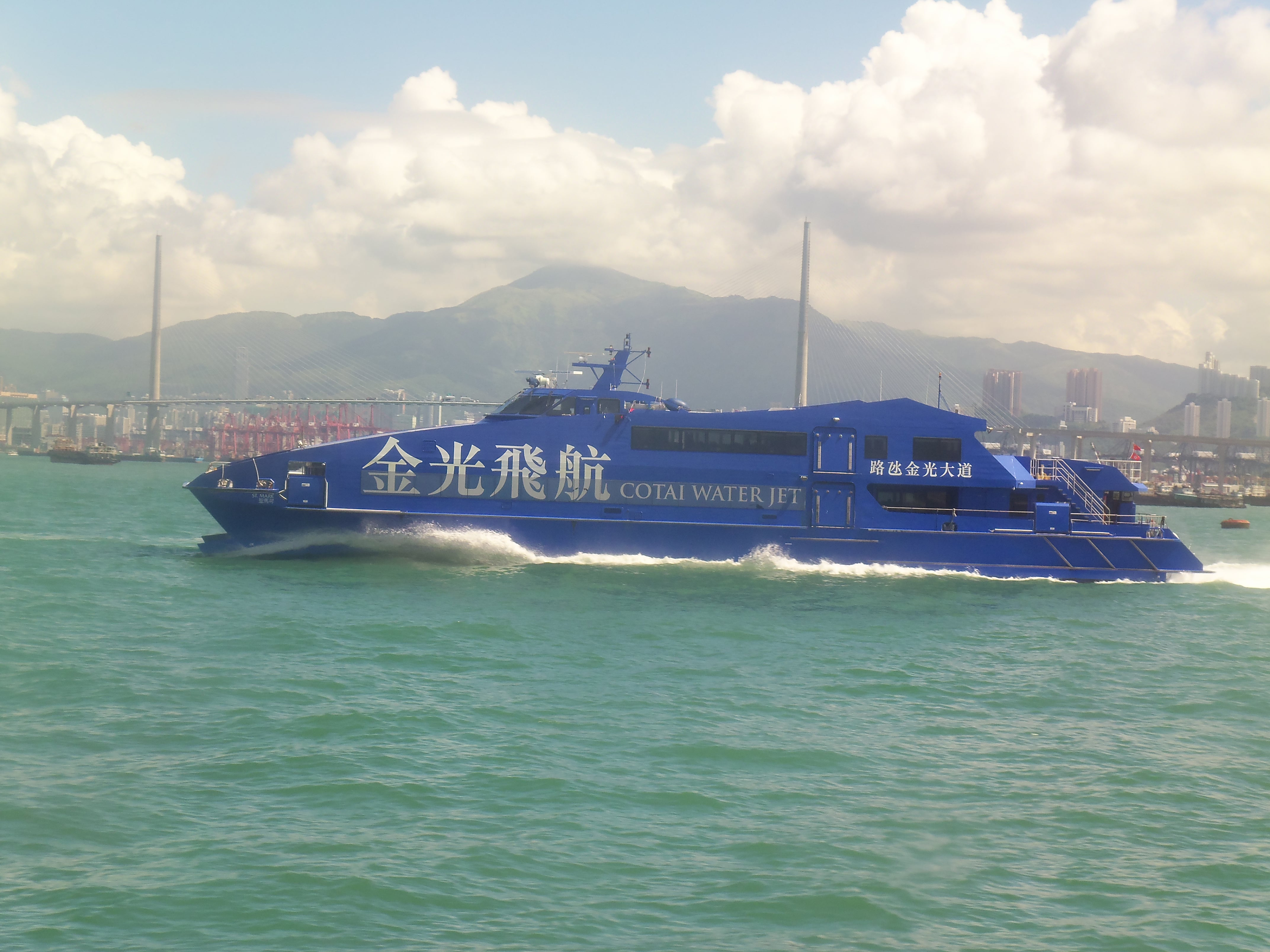

Chinese name
- Traditional Chinese: 金光飛航
- Simplified Chinese: 金光飞航
- Literal meaning: Golden Ray Jet
Transcriptions
Standard Mandarin
- Hanyu Pinyin: Jīnguāng Fēiháng
Yue: Cantonese
- Jyutping: gam1 gwong1 fei1 hong4

Portuguese name
- Portuguese: Jacto de Água Cotai

English name
- English: Cotai Water Jet

Cotai Water Jet (Chinese: 金光飛航; Portuguese: Jacto de Água Cotai) is a company that operates high-speed ferry services between Macau and Hong Kong. It is one of the two companies operating high-speed ferry services between the two territories – the other one being TurboJET.

The Taipa Ferry Terminal in Macau is used by this ferry route to enable easy access to The Venetian Macao in Cotai, although it is also chosen by some because of its proximity to Taipa, Cotai, and Coloane in comparison to the Outer Harbour Ferry Terminal (Terminal Marítimo) used by TurboJET on the Macau Peninsula. Cotai Water Jet is a subsidiary of Las Vegas Sands.

Cotai Water Jet has been assigned the two-letter airline code 8C by IATA, which it uses for all routes, though official it is supposed to be used for routes between Hong Kong International Airport and Macau only.

== Current routes ==
- Taipa Ferry Terminal, Macau ↔ Hong Kong–Macau Ferry Terminal, Hong Kong
- Taipa Ferry Terminal, Macau ↔ Hong Kong China Ferry Terminal, Hong Kong
- Taipa Ferry Terminal, Macau ↔ Skypier, Hong Kong International Airport, Chek Lap Kok, Hong Kong
- Outer Harbour Ferry Terminal, Macau ↔ Hong Kong–Macau Ferry Terminal, Hong Kong

== Fleet ==
Cotai Water Jet's fleet are built by Austal Shipyard of Australia.

=== Brand of vessels ===
- Austal 48m: 47.5m length, 70 (net) tonnes, 411/413/417 passengers catamaran. Propelled by waterjets powered by quadruple MTU 16V 4000 M70 diesel engines, rated at 2320 kW each. Cruising speed at 42 knots. Built by Austal Shipyard of Australia.

=== List of vessels ===
Cotai Water Jet operated a total of 14 Austal 48ms at its peak, in which only 9 remain in service as of 2026:

- THE LONDONER
- THE VENETIAN
- THE COTAI STRIP EXPO
- SHOPPES COTAI CENTRAL
- LONDONER GRAND
- SHOPPES FOUR SEASONS
- THE PLAZA
- COTAI STRIP COTAIARENA (Sold and shipped to Busan, South Korea in August 2022. Returned to Hong Kong in 2024)
- COTAI STRIP COTAIGOLD (Shipped to Busan, South Korea in September 2022. Returned to Hong Kong in 2024)
- GOURMET DINING
- MARCO POLO (sold to Seajets in 2026. Awaiting delivery)
- ST. MARK (sold to Seajets in 2026. Awaiting delivery)
- CASTELLA SQUARE (Sold and shipped to Split, Croatia in February 2022. Returned to Hong Kong in 2024)
- DI MODA SQUARE

=== Rented vessels (all returned in early 2009) ===
- Lian Shan Hu: 39.5m length, 338 passengers catamaran. Propelled by waterjets powered by twin MTU 16V 396 TE 74L diesel engines, rated at 1580 kW each. Maximum speed at 32 knots. Built by Austal Shipyard of Australia.
- Nan Gui: 40.1m length, 338 passengers catamaran. Propelled by waterjets powered by twin MTU 16V 396 TE 74L diesel engines, rated at 1825 kW each. Maximum speed at 32 knots. Built by Austal Shipyard of Australia.

== Ticketing offices ==
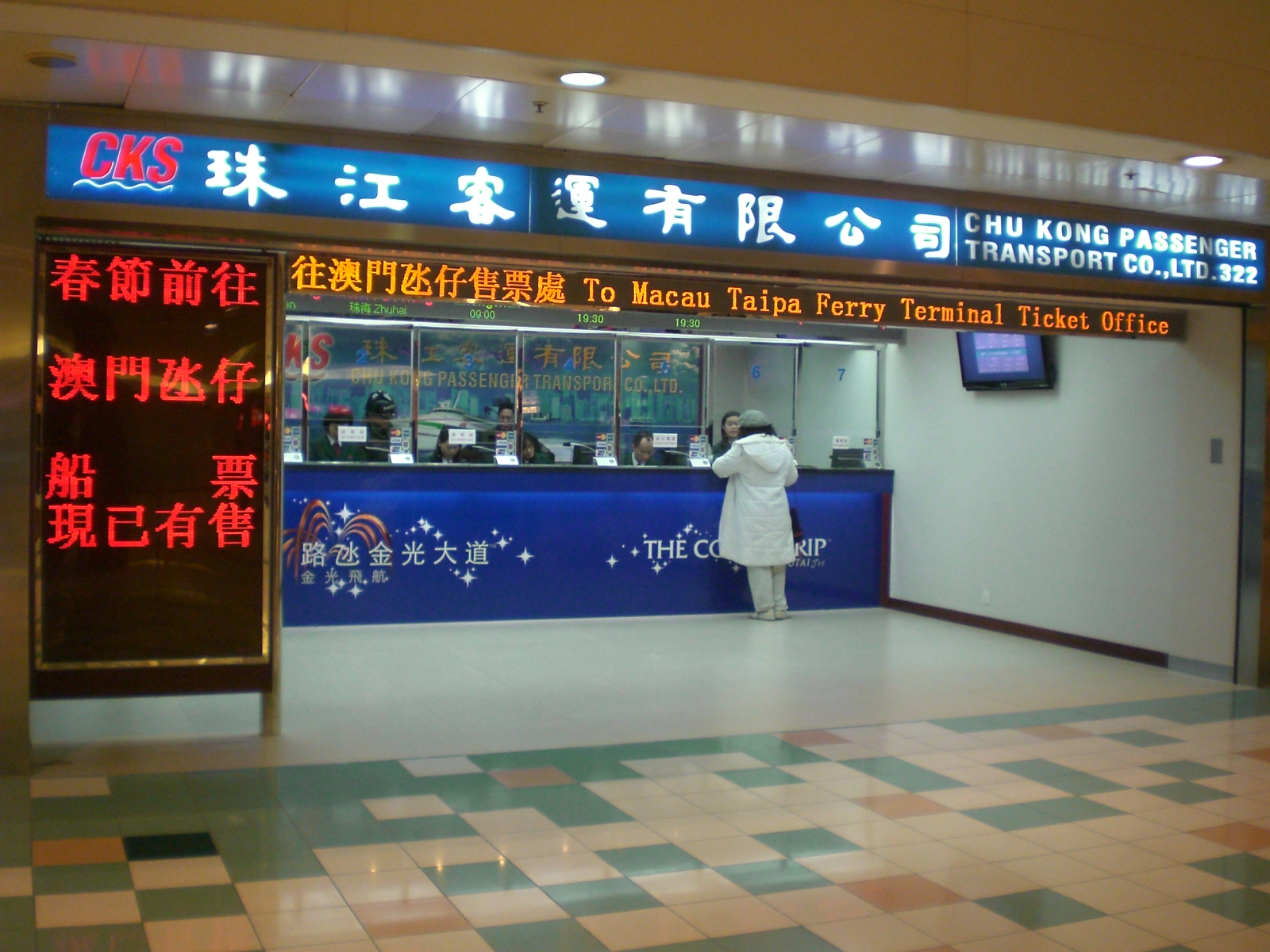
Ticket counter of Cotai Water Jet (operated by CKS) at Shun Tak Center, Sheung Wan, Hong Kong

This is a list where passengers can buy tickets to Cotai Water Jet.

=== Macau ===
==== The Venetian Macao ====
- Cotai Travel (Shop 1028)
- Concierge Desk (Hotel Lobby, Level 1)
- Concierge Desk (Hotel West Lobby, Level 1)
- Cotai Ticketing North and South Box Offices (Cotai Arena, Level 1)
- Customer service counter (Di Moda Street at the Grand Canal Shoppes)
- Cotai Ticketing Call Center (Macau: +853 2882 8818 / Hong Kong: +852 6333 6660)

==== Sands Macao ====
- Guest Services Counter, Ground Level

==== Sands Cotai Central ====
- CotaiTravel (Shop1030)
- Concierge Counter (Conrad Macao Lobby, Cotai Central)
- Concierge Counter (Holiday Inn Macao Lobby, Cotai Central)
- Concierge Desk (Sheraton Macao Hotel Main Lobby, Cotai Central)
- CotaiTicketing Box Office (Holiday Inn)
- CotaiTicketing Box Office (Sheraton Hotel)

==== Taipa Ferry Terminal ====
- Cotai Water Jet Ticketing Counter (Departure Hall)

=== Hong Kong ===
==== Sheung Wan ====
- Shop 305D, Shun Tak Centre, 200 Connaught Road, Sheung Wan, Hong Kong

==== Tsim Sha Tsui ====
- Shop 7, 1/F China Ferry Terminal, 33 Canton Road, Tsim Sha Tsui, Kowloon

==== Hong Kong International Airport ====
- Transfer Area E2, Level 5, Hong Kong International Airport Passenger Terminal Building One

== Accidents ==
- On 29 August 2009, a Cotai Water Jet bumped into a giant buoy and broke the catamaran windows with 1 injured.
- On 4 September 2009, THE VENETIAN collided with a sampan at Zhuhai waters killing 1 person.
- On 25 December 2009, COTAI STRIP COTAIGOLD collided with a Hong Kong fishing boat in Zhuhai waters near Lantau Island with 9 injured. The left bow of the catamaran was crushed and repaired later.
