= Hong Kong China Ferry Terminal =

Pier in Kowloon, Hong Kong

Coordinates: 22.29931°N 114.16725°E

- Traditional Chinese: 中國客運碼頭
- Simplified Chinese: 中国客运码头
Transcriptions
Standard Mandarin
- Hanyu Pinyin: Zhōngguó Kèyùn Mǎtóu
Yue: Cantonese
- Yale Romanization: Jūng gwok haak wahn máah tàuh
- Jyutping: Zung1 gwok3 haak3 wan6 maa5 tau4

Abbreviation
- Traditional Chinese: 中港碼頭
Transcriptions
Yue: Cantonese
- Yale Romanization: Jūng góng máah tàuh
- Jyutping: Zung1 gong2 maa5 tau4

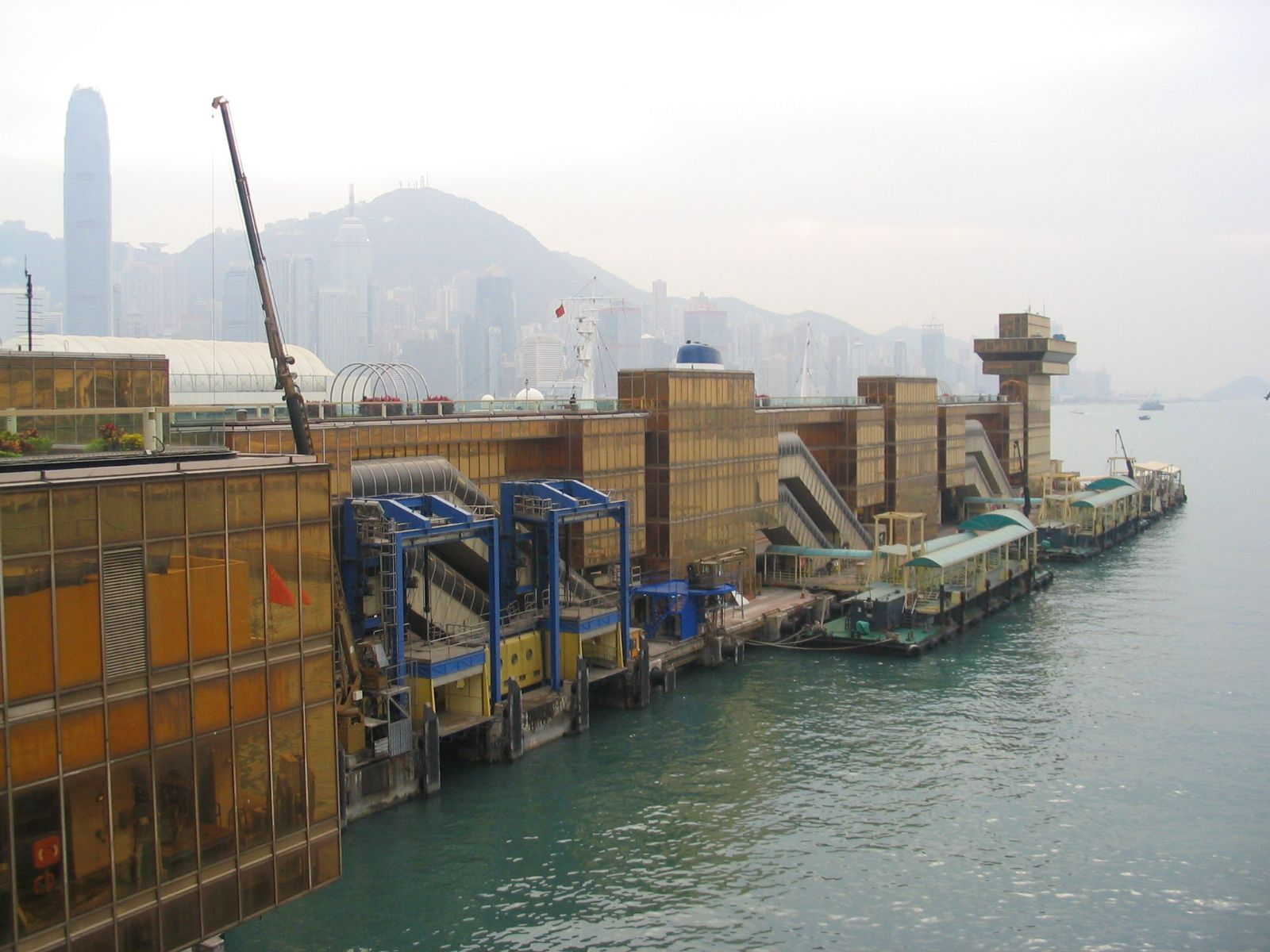
China Ferry Terminal

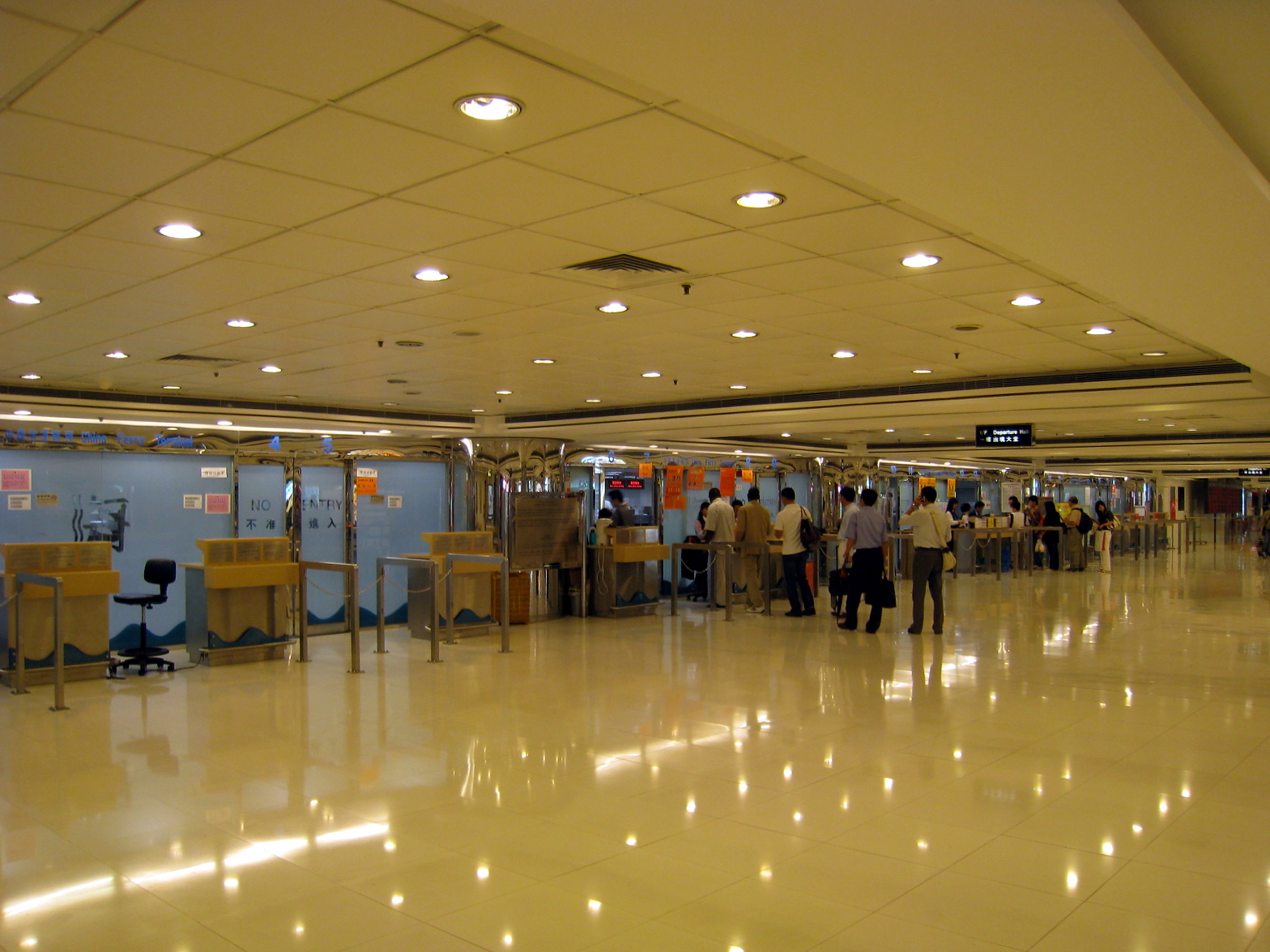
China Ferry Terminal Departure Hall

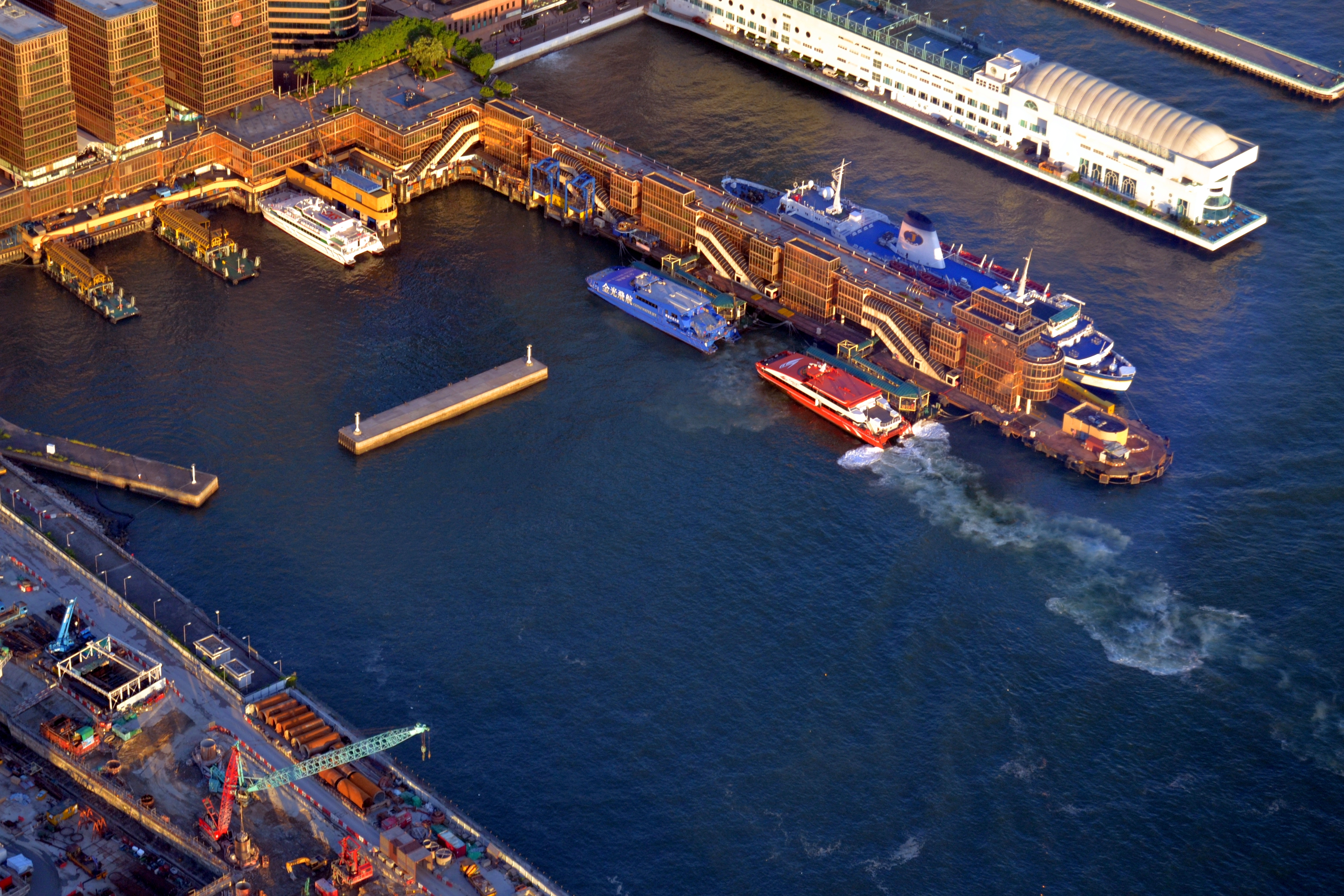
China Ferry Terminal viewed from Sky100

Hong Kong China Ferry Terminal is a ferry terminal, located at China Hong Kong City, 33 Canton Road, Tsim Sha Tsui, Kowloon, Hong Kong. It is one of three cross-border ferry terminals in Hong Kong.

The pier has operated since 8 October 1988. It operates 06:00–22:00 Monday–Friday, and 06:00–02:00 Saturday, Sunday, and public holidays. It provides ferry services to Macau and mainland China.

The ferry terminal, including ferry routes, was temporarily suspended from 30 January 2020 to early 2023 due to the COVID-19 pandemic.

== Routes ==
Several ferry companies operate routes that depart from the China Ferry Terminal, including:

- Chu Kong Passenger Transport (CKS), which operates services to Zhuhai, Zhongshan, Shunde, Panyu, Jiangmen, Dongguan, Heshan, Gaoming, Kaiping, Taishan, Doumen and Zhaoqing in mainland China.
- Panyu Nansha Port Passenger Transport Company, which operates a 1h15-minute catamaran service to Nansha in mainland China.
- Cotai Jet, which operates a 1-hour service to Taipa Ferry Terminal
- TurboJET, with ferries every 30 minutes to Macau Outer Harbour Ferry Terminal.

== See also ==
- Hong Kong–Macau Ferry Terminal, another cross-border ferry terminal in Hong Kong
- Tuen Mun Ferry Pier, another cross-border ferry terminal in Hong Kong
