= The Venetian Macao =

Luxury resort on the Cotai Strip in Macau

Coordinates: 22°8′55″N 113°33′38″E

- 澳門威尼斯人

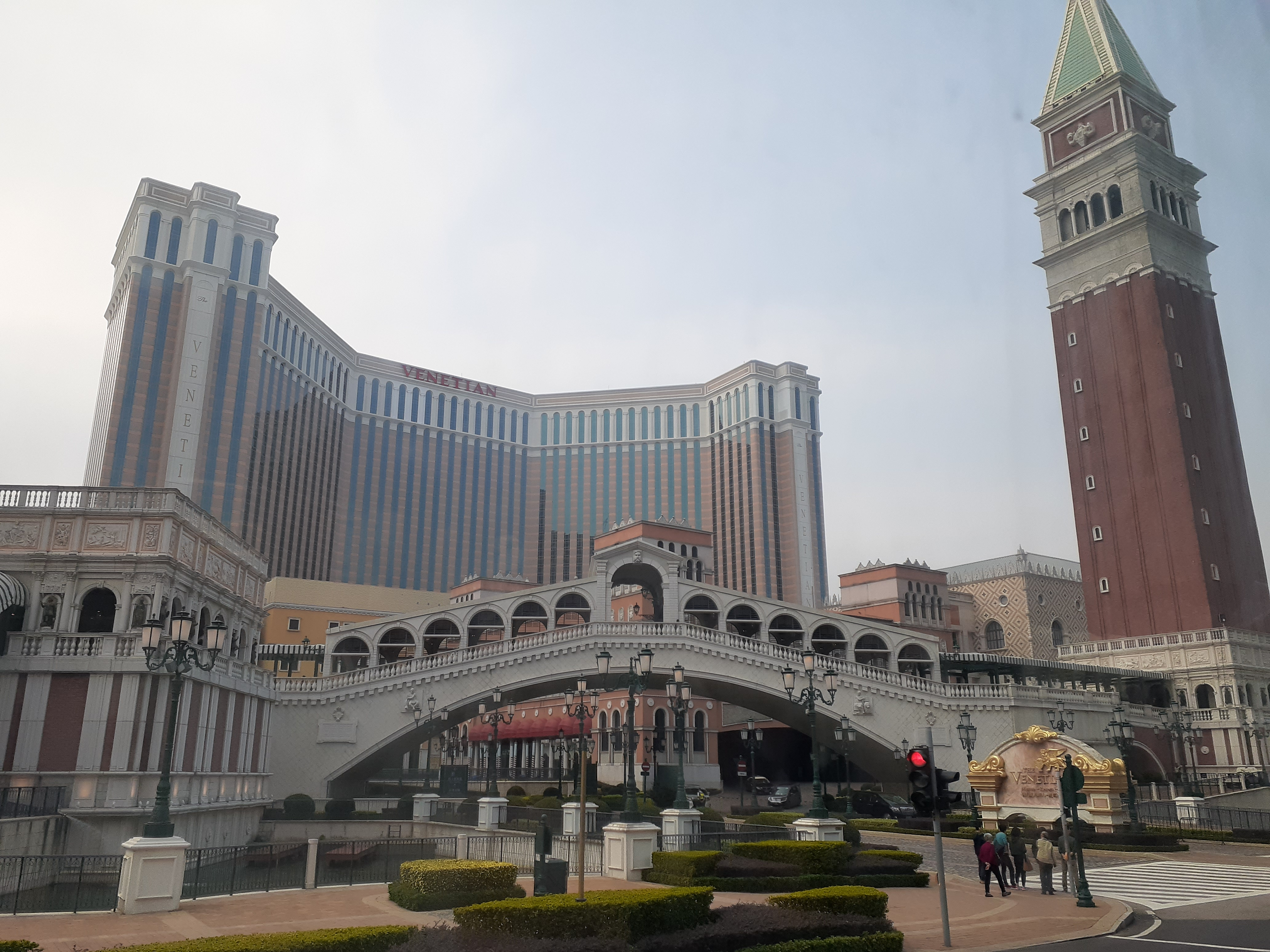
- The Venetian Macao (2019)
- Interactive map of The Venetian Macao
- Location: Macau; Cotai Strip
- Opened: 28 August 2007; 19 years ago
- Theme: Venice, Italy
- No. of rooms: 3,000
- Gaming space: 550,000 sq ft (51,000 m^{2})
- Signature attractions: Cotai Arena
- Casino type: Land-based
- Owner: Las Vegas Sands
- Architect: Aedas and HKS, Inc.
- Website: Venetian Macao

The Venetian Macao
- Traditional Chinese: 澳門威尼斯人
- Simplified Chinese: 澳门威尼斯人
Transcriptions
Standard Mandarin
- Hanyu Pinyin: Àomén Wēinísīrén
Yue: Cantonese
- Jyutping: ou3 mun4*2 wai1 nei4 si1 jan4

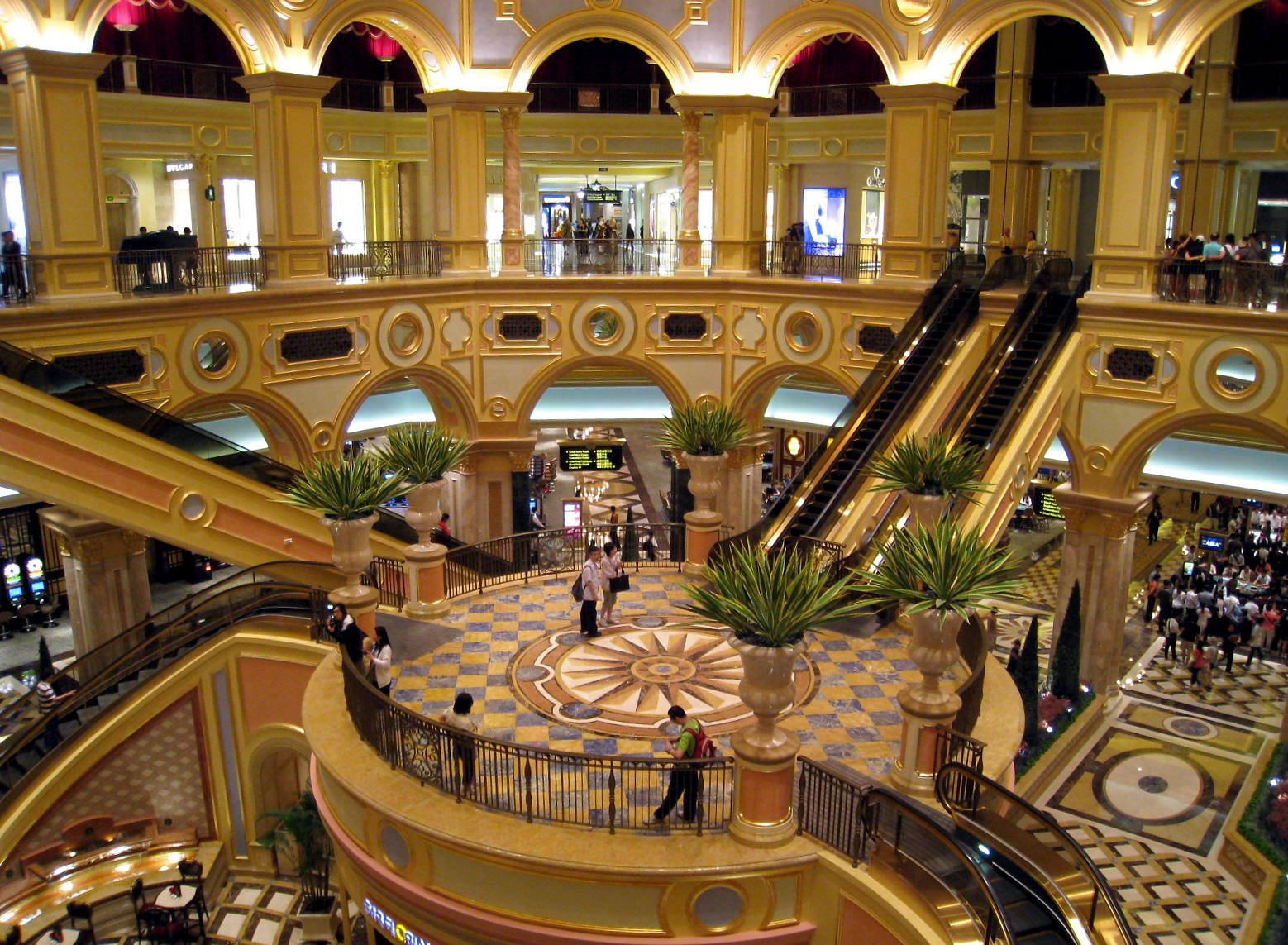
The Great Hall

The Venetian Macao (Chinese: 澳門威尼斯人) is a hotel and casino resort in Macau, China owned by the American Las Vegas Sands company. The 39-storey structure on Macau's Cotai Strip has 10,500,000-square-foot (980,000 m^{2}) of floor space, and is modeled on its sister casino resort The Venetian Las Vegas. It is the 2nd largest casino in the world, the largest single structure hotel in Asia, and the tenth-largest building in the world by floor area.

The main hotel tower was finished in July 2007, and the resort officially opened on 28 August 2007. It has 3,000 suites, 1,200,000 sq ft (110,000 m^{2}) of convention space, 1,600,000 sq ft (150,000 m^{2}) of retail space, and 550,000 square feet (51,000 m^{2}) of casino space (with 3,400 slot machines, 800 gambling tables), and the 15,000-seat The Venetian Arena for entertainment and sports events.

Its lead architects were Aedas and HKS, Inc., who were responsible for its design, coordination and implementation.

== Location ==
The Venetian is located on Macau's Cotai Strip, an area that includes a dozen multibillion-dollar resorts, a private university campus, and the Macau garrison of the People's Liberation Army.

The Venetian was built on reclaimed land and its foundation is supported by 1,530 concrete pilings.

== Facilities ==
The Venetian's facilities include 3,000 hotel rooms, 300 retail stores, an indoor canal, a clinic, a spa, and a gymnasium.

=== Casino ===
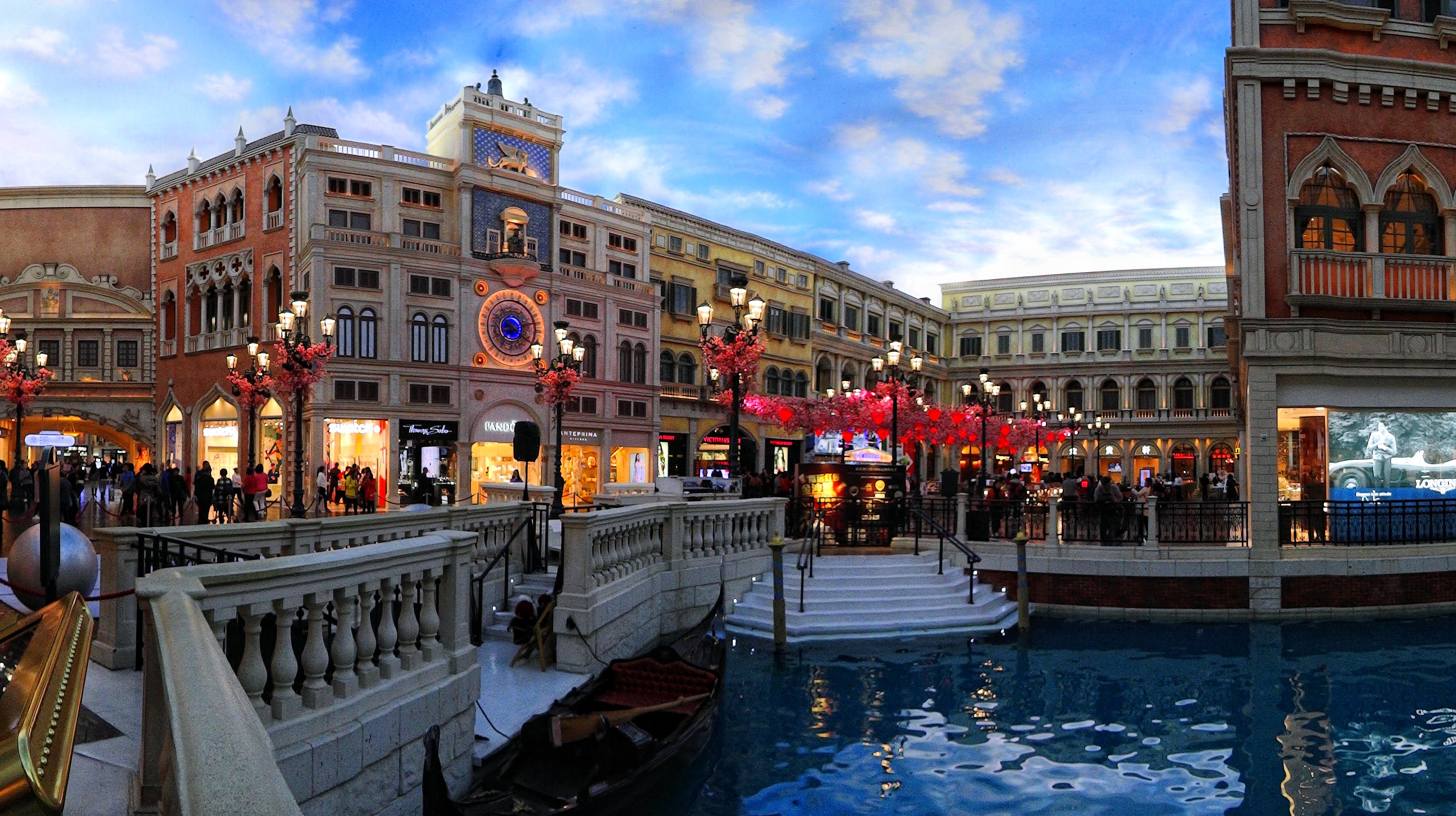
A section of the San Luca canal

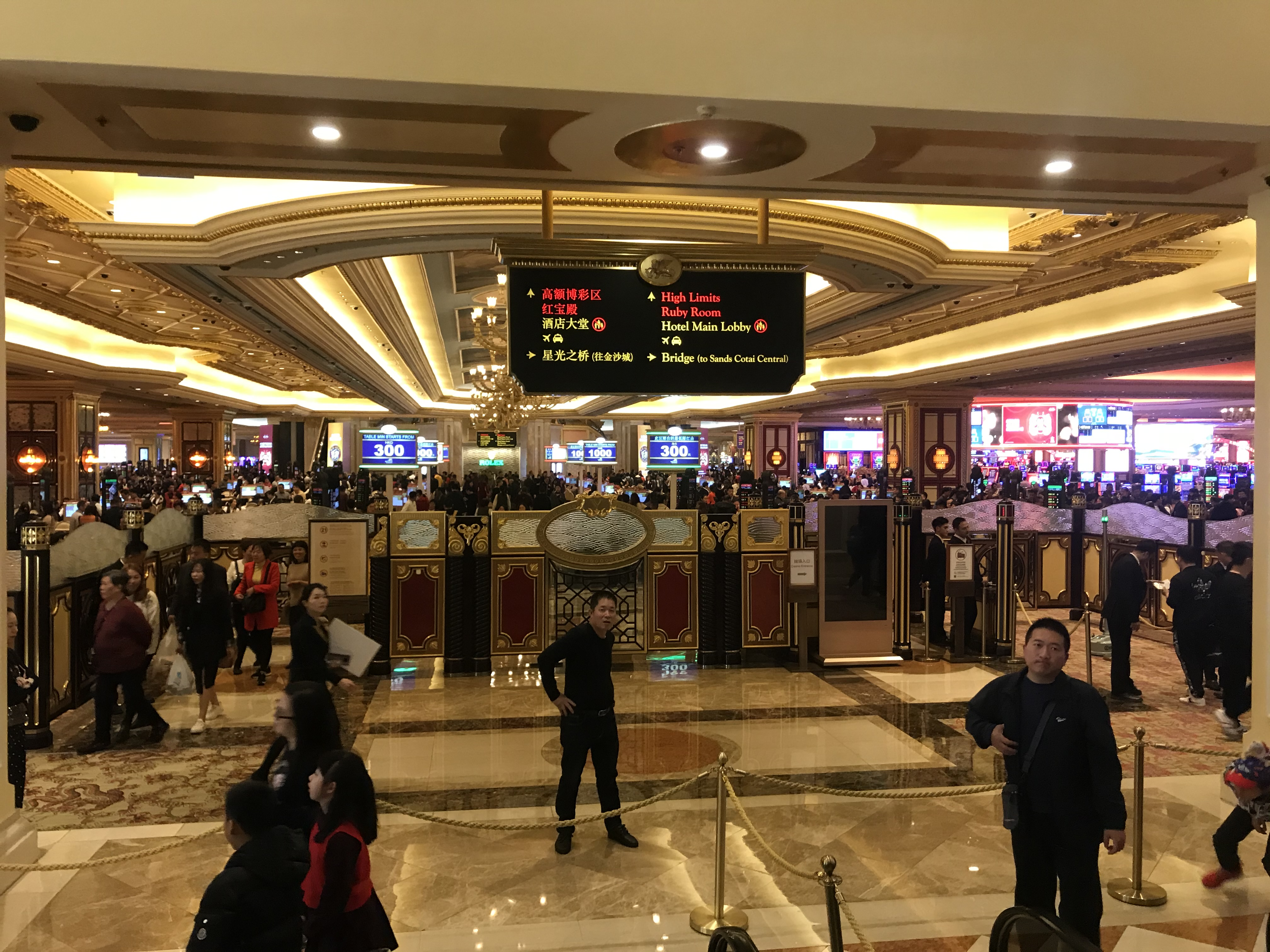
Inside the casino in 2020

The casino measures 546,000 sq ft (50,700 m^{2}). It is further divided into four themed gaming areas:

- Golden Fish
- Imperial House
- Red Dragon
- Phoenix

The casino contains slot machines and gambling tables.

The attached hotel contains a club called Paiza Club which is reserved for premium guests. The gaming area of the Paiza Club is divided into individual private gaming rooms each named for notable Asian cities and regions such as Yunnan, Guangzhou, Hong Kong, Singapore and Kuala Lumpur.

== Entertainment ==
=== The Venetian Arena ===
Video of a singing gondoliere

The Venetian has a 15,000-seat arena. It is used for hosting large indoor functions such as sporting events like basketball, tennis, and boxing, as well as concerts and international televised awards shows. Events are held year-round.

The Venetian Arena has 4 levels:

1. Event Level
2. Main Concourse
3. Upper Concourse
4. VIP Level

== Transportation ==
The Venetian Macao is within distance from Cotai West station-Cotai Expo Entrance on the Taipa section of the Macau Light Rapid Transit that serves the Cotai Strip and the larger area of Cotai.

The Venetian also operates a private bus fleet.

== Controversies ==
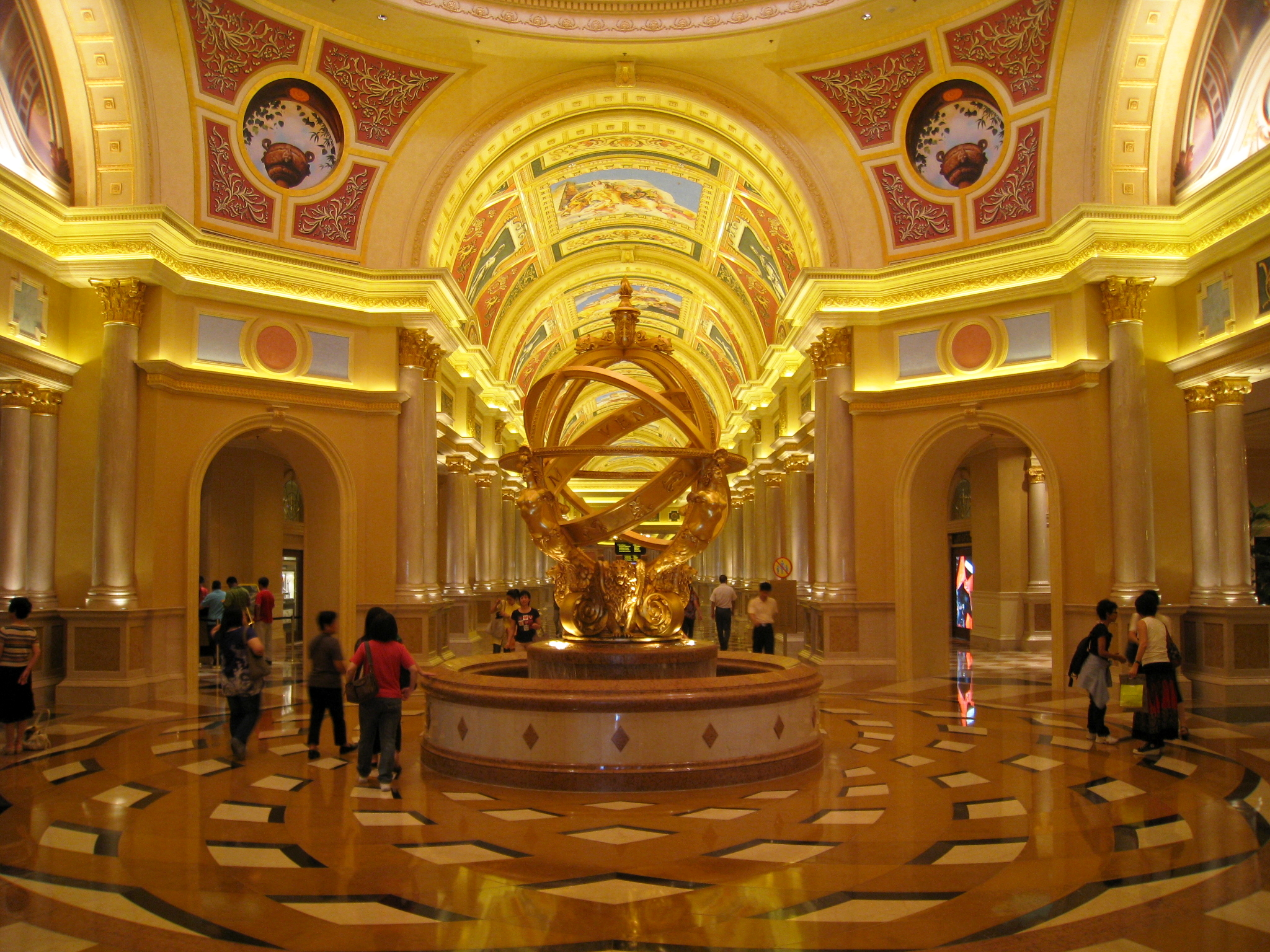
Venetian lobby

On 12 November 2008, the gates were locked to the construction labor force from a variety of Asian countries as projects were suspended. Hsin Chong, the project manager for the Venetian, laid off approximately 400 staff. As many workers had been there for less than two years, no severance was due. The next day, Sands' president for Asia announced that up to 11,000 workers would be losing their jobs as the company was halting building projects in Macau.

In 2010 the Chinese press reported that authorities had found more than 100 prostitutes inside the casino as part of a "sex-trade crackdown".

In early 2011 the United States Department of Justice and the U.S. Securities and Exchange Commission initiated an investigation into the Las Vegas Sands Corporation with respect to the compliance of its Macao properties with the Foreign Corrupt Practices Act. In 2016, the Las Vegas Sands Corporation settled a civil lawsuit brought by the U.S. SEC over the allegations and paid $9 million. It paid a further $6.96 million in 2017 to settle criminal allegations made by the U.S. DOJ.

== See also ==
- Gambling in Macau
- Cotai Jet – owned by The Venetian Macao, operating high-speed catamaran ferry services between Taipa Temporary Ferry Terminal and Hong Kong–Macau Ferry Terminal, Hong Kong
- List of properties on the Cotai Strip
- List of Macau casinos
- List of largest hotels
- List of integrated resorts
- Macau Giant Pandas
