= Hong Kong–Macau Ferry Terminal =

Ferry terminal and heliport in Sheung Wan

Hong Kong-Macau Ferry Terminal
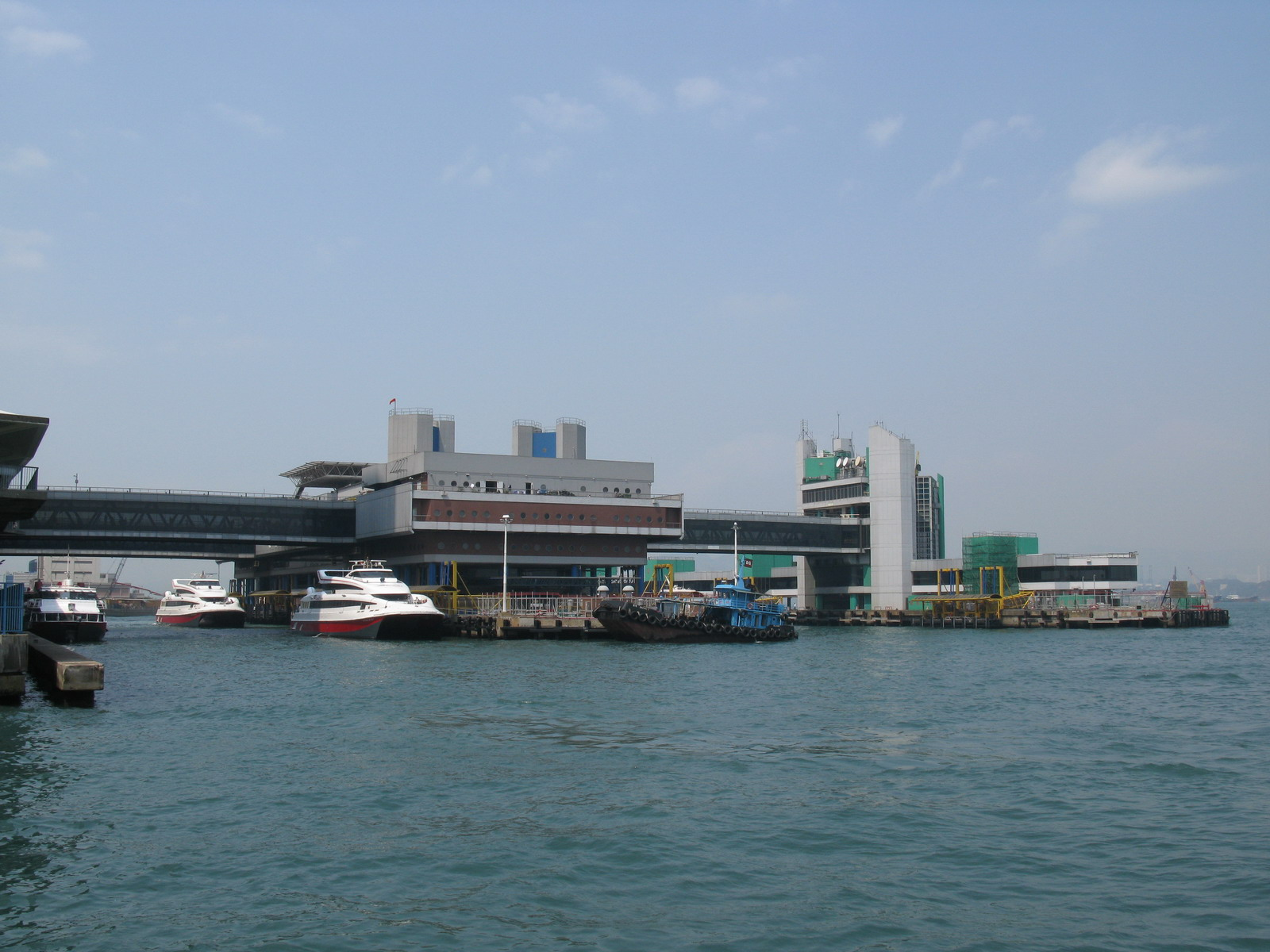
- Hong Kong-Macau Ferry Terminal in March 2008
- Traditional Chinese: 港澳客輪碼頭
- Simplified Chinese: 港澳客轮码头
- Literal meaning: Hong Kong-Macau passenger ship pier
Transcriptions
Standard Mandarin
- Hanyu Pinyin: Gǎng Ào Kèlún Mǎtóu
Yue: Cantonese
- Yale Romanization: Góng ou haak lèuhn máh tàuh
- Jyutping: Gong2 ou3 haak3 leon4 maa5 tau4

The Hong Kong–Macau Ferry Terminal is a ferry terminal and heliport located in Sheung Wan on Hong Kong Island. It is also known as the Macau Ferry Terminal, the Hong Kong-Macau Ferry Pier or the Shun Tak Heliport, and has an ICAO code of VHST.

The terminal is one of the several in Hong Kong that provide ferry services to Macau and cities in southern China. Scheduled helicopter service is provided to Macau, with charter services to other regional destinations.

The terminal is located immediately to the west of Hong Kong's main business district, on the north shore of Hong Kong Island. It is connected to the territory's Mass Transit Railway, and well served by other forms of public transport. The terminal forms part of the Shun Tak Centre, a commercial and transport complex.

== History ==
Scheduled ferries have run between Hong Kong and Macau since the earliest days of the Hong Kong colony. Ferries to Macau departed from the old Macau Ferry Piers at this location from at least the mid-20th century, although in the 1960s the steamships – Tak Sing, Dai Loy, Fat Shan and the (more luxurious) Macao – would take around four hours for the trip. Also part of the present site was the famous Western Market.

In 1971, the Fat Shan sunk as the result of Typhoon Rose while on its way to Macau. 92 out of 96 aboard died, with most of them being crew members. It was carrying no passengers.

The ferry terminal, including ferry routes, was temporarily suspended from 4 February 2020 until 8 January 2023 due to the COVID-19 pandemic.

== Ferry facilities ==
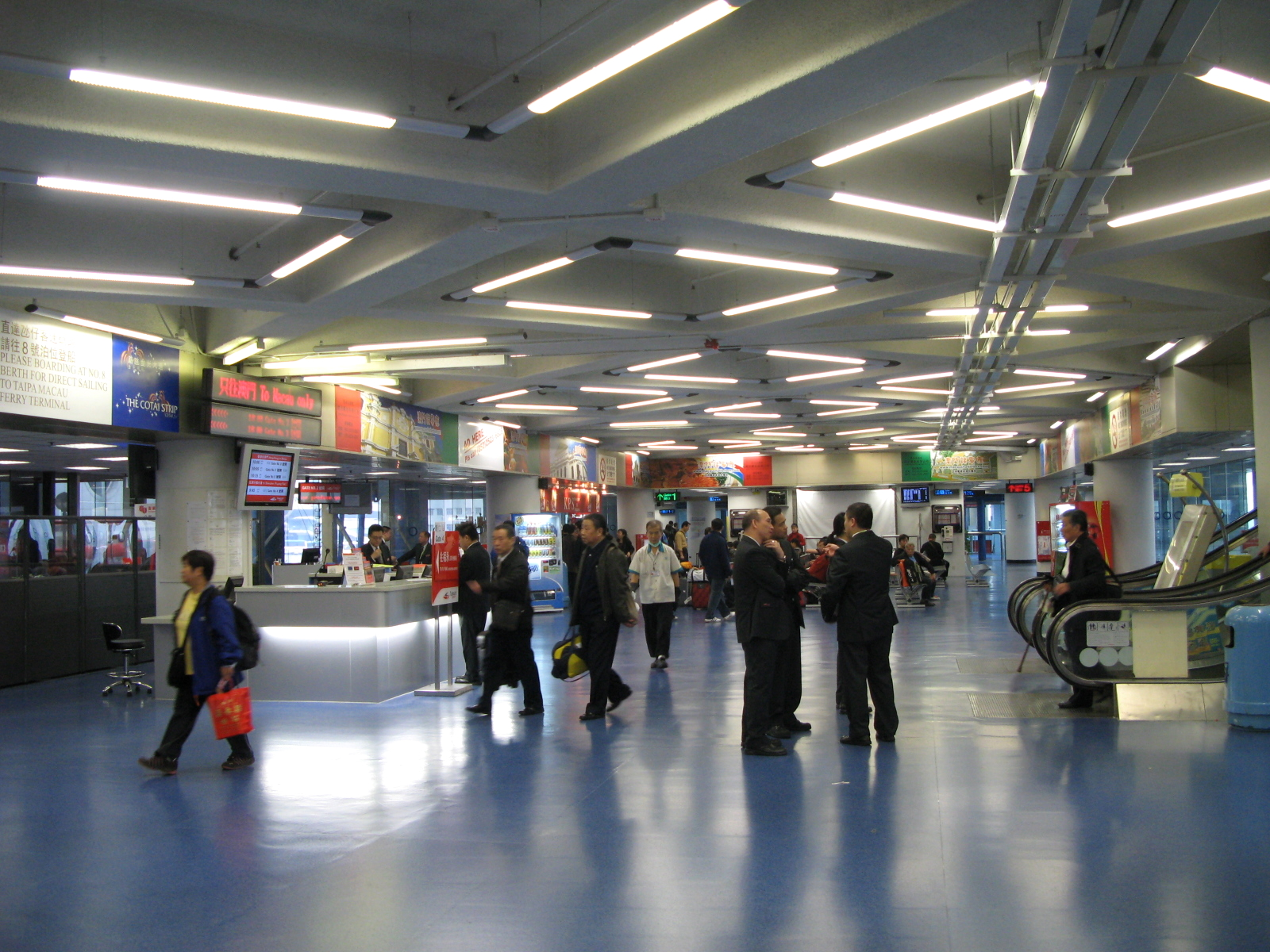
Ferry Terminal Concourse in December 2007

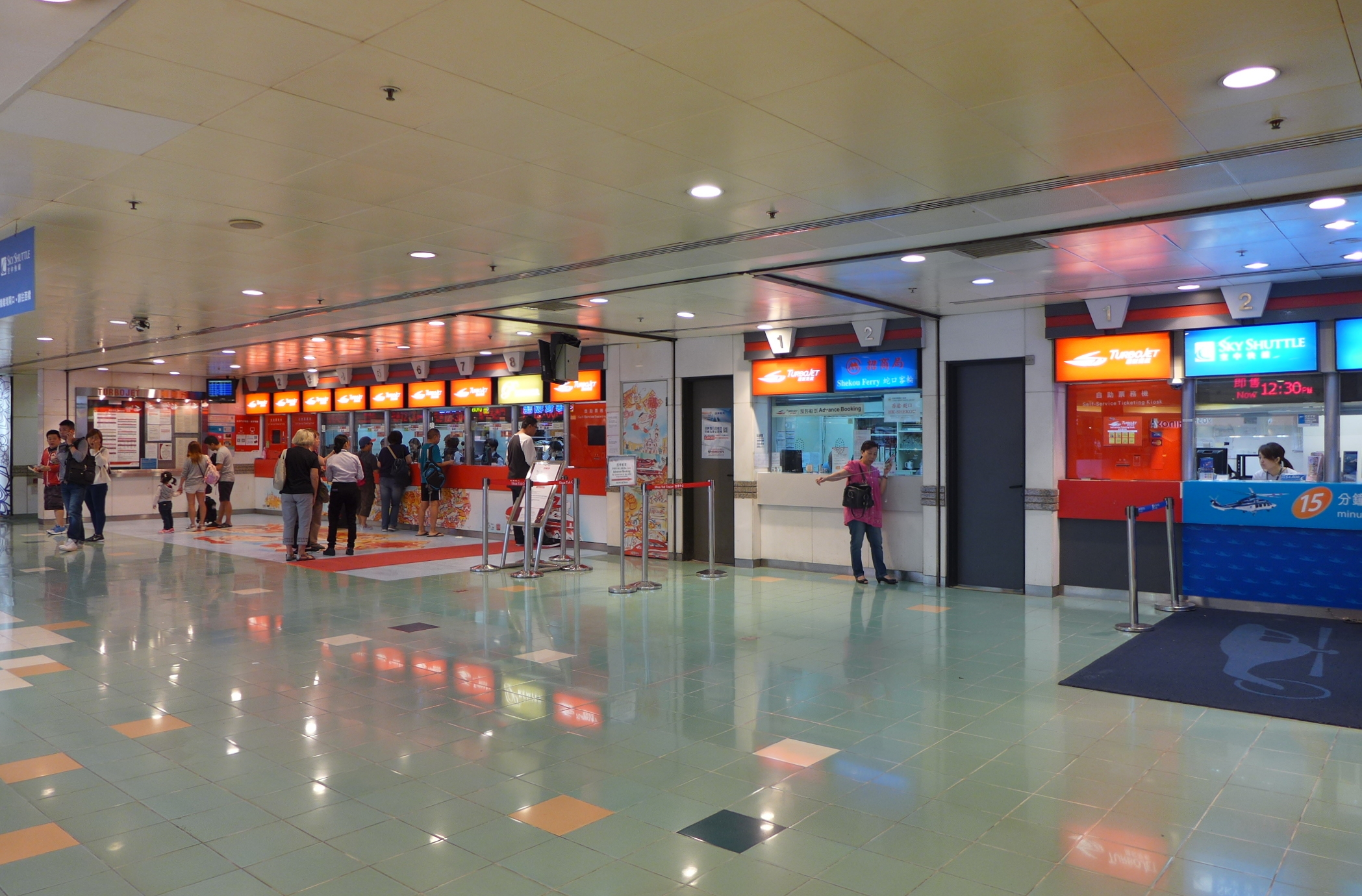
Ticket Office in October 2015

The terminal utilises two island piers, each with several ferry docks, linked by enclosed pedestrian bridges to the ticketing and departure/arrival hall facilities in the lower levels of the Shun Tak Centre on the shore. The heliport is located above the inner pier, whilst the Hong Kong Vessel Traffic Centre, which monitors and regulates vessels navigating in the waters of Hong Kong, is located above the outer pier.

The terminal is the main point of departure for ferries to Macau, although services also operate from the Hong Kong-China Ferry Terminal in Tsim Sha Tsui and from Hong Kong International Airport (for transiting passengers only).

Ferry services are provided to Macau by two companies, both of which use a variety of designs of fast ferries, including catamarans and Boeing Jetfoils. TurboJET provides services to the Outer Harbour Ferry Terminal in central Macau. Cotai Water Jet operates to the Taipa Ferry Terminal on the Taipa island, which enables easy access to The Venetian Macao casino and Macau International Airport. Both operators run services every 30 minutes, or more frequently, during the day, with TurboJET providing a limited overnight service. The journey time is approximately one hour.

Several companies also provide limited service to ports within China's Guangdong, with destinations served including Shekou and Nansha. Other services to Guangdong destinations operate from the Hong Kong-China Ferry Terminal in Tsim Sha Tsui and Hong Kong International Airport (for transiting passengers only).

=== Accident on 29 November 2013 ===
On 29 November 2013, Madeira, a Boeing 929-100 Jetfoil of TurboJET with 105 passengers and 10 crew members onboard collided with an unknown object off Hei Ling Chau. 87 people were injured in the crash. The ferry crashed on Friday morning at 1:15 AM, on the way to Macau. Madeira then made its way to Kau Yi Chau and was hauled back to the ferry pier by a tugboat. Later that morning, it was hauled to Stonecutters shipyard for inspection. To this day, it's still unknown what did Madeira collide with.

== Heliport ==
Shun Tak Heliport
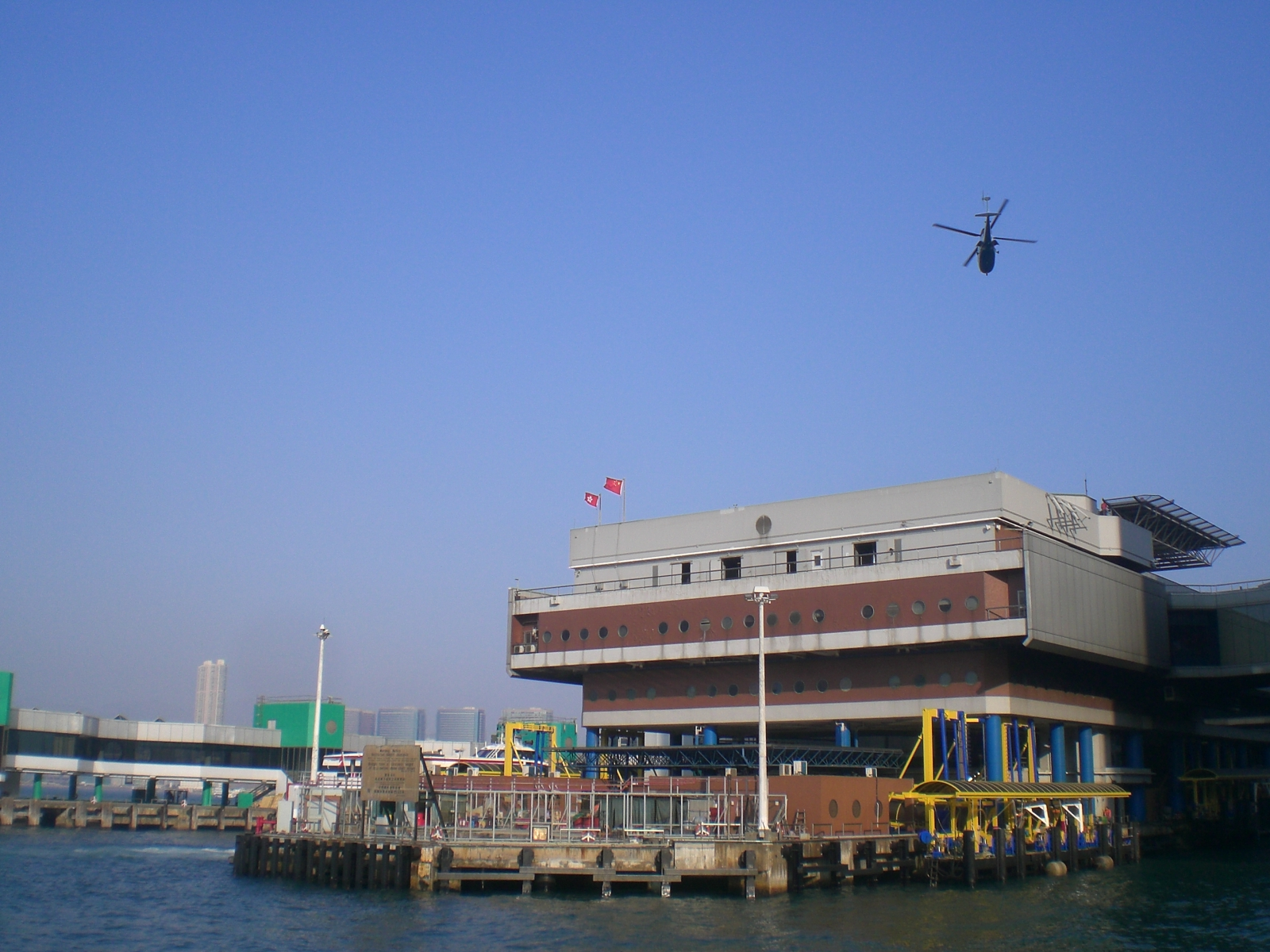
- Shun Tak Heliport in January 2008
- IATA: HHP; ICAO: VHST

Summary
- Airport type: Public
- Location: Sheung Wan, Hong Kong Island, Hong Kong
- Elevation AMSL: 107 ft (33 m)
- Coordinates: 22°17′21.74″N 114°9′7.75″E
- Interactive map of Shun Tak Heliport

The heliport is formally known as the Shun Tak Heliport (IATA: HHP, ICAO: VHST). It is located above the inner pier of the ferry terminal, at an elevation of 107 feet (33 m) above sea level, and provides two helipads and a customer lounge. There is no refuelling service available. Use of the heliport is restricted to multi-engine helicopters with a maximum overall length, including rotor disk, of 16 metres (52 ft) and a maximum all up weight not exceeding 5,350 kilograms (11,790 lb).

The original heliport at the Hong Kong–Macau Ferry Terminal was built in 1990, and provided a single helipad situated over the western end of the inner pier. The Hong Kong Heliport Expansion Project commenced in April 2008, when a new helipad was built over the eastern end of the same pier linked to a new passenger lounge. Once this was operational, the original helipad was replaced and two helipads linked, with project completion in October 2009.

Macau-based Sky Shuttle helicopters use the heliport to provide a scheduled service to a corresponding heliport above the Outer Harbour Ferry Terminal in Macau. Services operate between 09:00 and 23:00, with flights departing every 30 minutes or more frequently if traffic demands it, using AgustaWestland AW139 helicopters. The journey time is approximately 16 minutes.

Sky Shuttle also provides charter services on the same route, and from the heliport to other locations in neighbouring regions, including Macau International Airport, Shenzhen Bao'an International Airport, and Guangzhou Baiyun International Airport.

== Destinations ==
Destination	Terminal Name; English (Chinese)
Shenzhen	Shekou Cruise Center (蛇口客运码头)
Macau	Outer Harbour Ferry Terminal (外港客運碼頭)
Macau	Taipa Ferry Terminal (氹仔客運碼頭)
Zhuhai	Zhuhai Jiuzhou Ferry Terminal (珠海港)

== Improvement fee ==
Each ferry passenger is charged for 19 HKD regardless of their age. Each helicopter passenger aged 12 or above is charged for 120 HKD for improvement fee and 30 MOP for aviation service fee. Starting from 1 April 1999, the improvement fee for airport transiting passengers who arrive or depart on the same day is waived.

== Ground transport ==
Apart from being a ferry terminal and heliport, it is also a public transport hub to various parts of Hong Kong. Adjacent to the terminal is the Sheung Wan MTR station, several bus termini are nearby the ferry terminal together with a minibus and taxi pick-up area at Shun Tak Centre. The Hong Kong Tramway has tram stops in either direction across the street.

Buses terminate at Hong Kong-Macau Ferry, Rumsey Street, Man Kat Street and Sheung Wan, nearby Hong Kong-Macau Ferry Terminal:

- Buses go to parts of Hong Kong Island such as Aldrich Bay, Island Resort and South Horizons
- Buses go to parts of Kowloon and New Territories such as City One Shatin, Ho Man Tin, Ping Shek Estate, Choi Fook Estate, Kowloon City Ferry
- Buses also go to and from: Yu Chui Court, Cross-Harbour Tunnel Toll Plaza, Tsz Wan Shan, Wan Tau Tong Estate, Luen Wo Hui, Po Tat Estate, Shun Lee, Kai Ching Estate, Ma On Shan, Hong Kong International Airport, Ngau Tau Kok, Yuen Long, Tiu Keng Leng.

== See also ==
- Transport in Hong Kong
