= Taipa Ferry Terminal =

Ferry terminal in Macau

Coordinates: 22°9′45″N 113°34′40″E

Chinese name
- Traditional Chinese: 氹仔客運碼頭
- Simplified Chinese: 氹仔客运码头
Transcriptions
Standard Mandarin
- Hanyu Pinyin: Dàngzǎi Kèyùn Mǎtóu
Yue: Cantonese
- Jyutping: tam^{5} zai^{2} haak^{3} wan^{6} maa^{5} tau^{4}

Taipa Temporary Ferry Terminal
- Traditional Chinese: 氹仔臨時客運碼頭
- Simplified Chinese: 氹仔临时客运码头
Transcriptions
Standard Mandarin
- Hanyu Pinyin: Dàngzǎi Línshí Kèyùn Mǎtóu
Yue: Cantonese
- Jyutping: tam^{5} zai^{2} lam^{4} si^{4} haak^{3} wan^{6} maa^{5} tau^{4}

Portuguese name
- Portuguese: Terminal Marítimo de Passageiros da Taipa

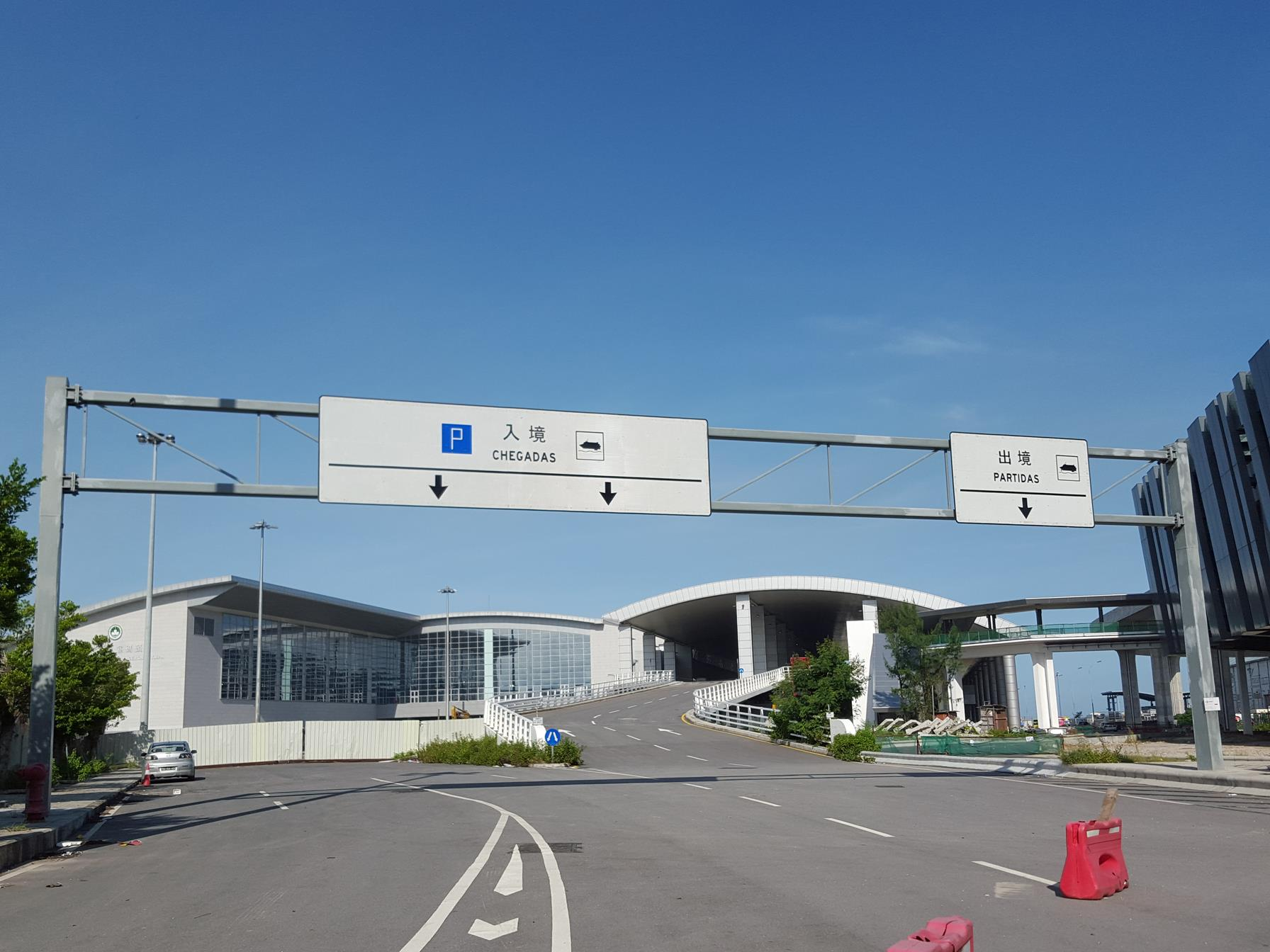
Taipa Ferry Terminal

The Taipa Ferry Terminal (Chinese: 氹仔客運碼頭; Portuguese: Terminal Marítimo de Passageiros da Taipa) (IATA: YFT) is located in Taipa, Macau SAR. It is located in the reclamation area of Pac On and is adjacent to the Macau International Airport. The terminal provides high-speed passenger ferry services from Macau to Hong Kong, Zhuhai, Shenzhen and Dongguan.

Prior to the opening of the permanent passenger terminal, in order to speed up the pressure of diverting the Outer Harbour Ferry Terminal, the Taipa Temporary Ferry Terminal was built and opened on 16 October 2007. The inauguration of the present permanent passenger terminal was held on 18 May 2017, presided over by the chief executive, Fernando Chui, and the secretary for transport and public works, Raimundo Arrais do Rosário.

== Temporary terminal ==
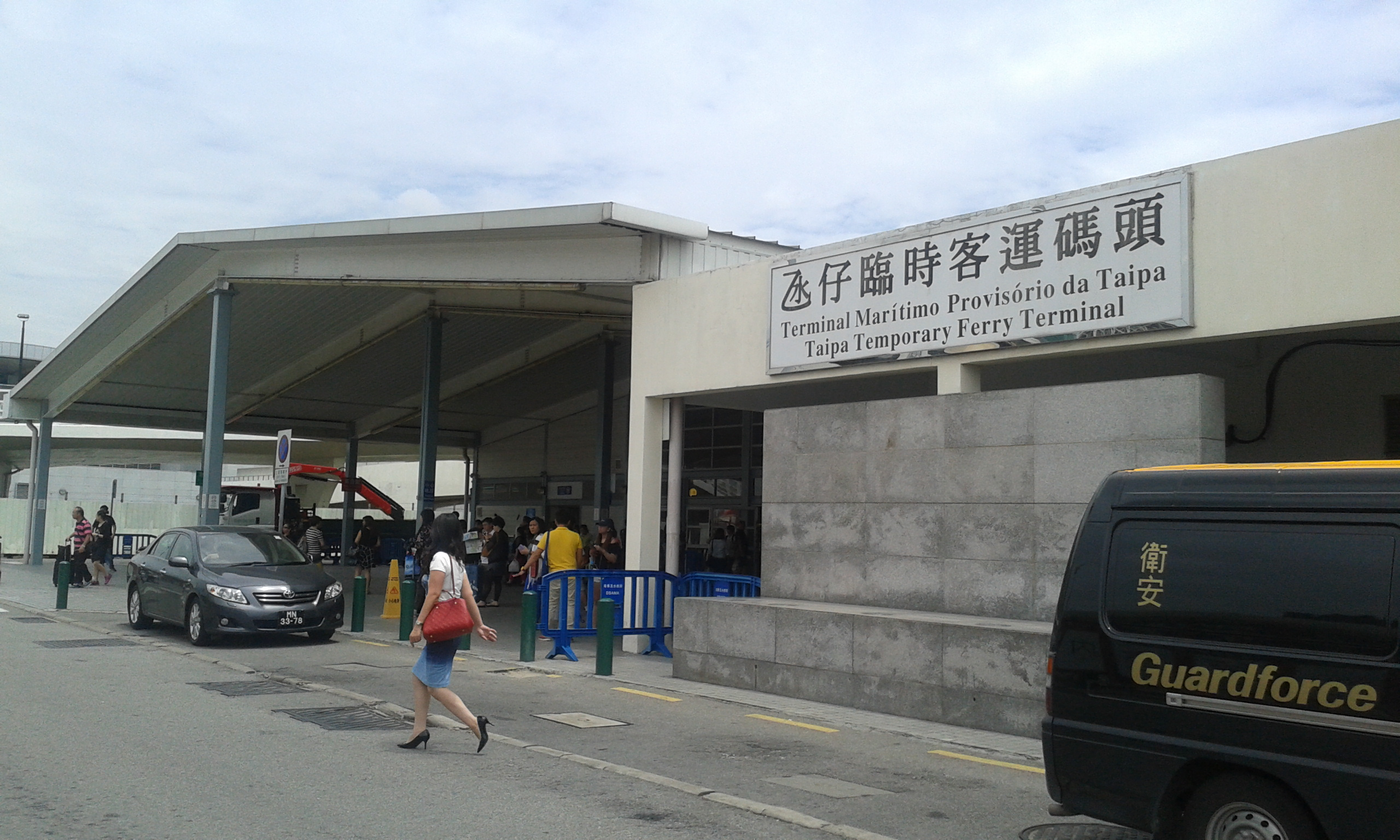
Taipa Temporary Ferry Terminal

The Taipa Temporary Ferry Terminal opened in 2007 (Chinese: 氹仔臨時客運碼頭; Portuguese: Terminal Marítimo Provisório da Taipa) was located a few meters north of the Macau International Airport. It was mainly served by Cotai Jet for services from the Hong Kong–Macau Ferry Terminal in Sheung Wan, Hong Kong and the Hong Kong China Ferry Terminal in Tsim Sha Tsui, Kowloon. It is now closed. The ferry terminal had two berths for hydrofoil and one for ferries, and served as a port of entry into Macau, with there being passport control desks - separated into those for Macau residents, Visitors (including Hong Kong identity card holders and Mainland China visitors) and Diplomats. There was also a visa-on-arrival application office for those who require a visa to enter Macau but had not applied prior to arriving at the ferry terminal. After that, behind the exit, was a customs zone.

The structure was formally closed on 1 June 2017, and replaced by a new, permanent ferry terminal in the same location.

== Transit connections ==
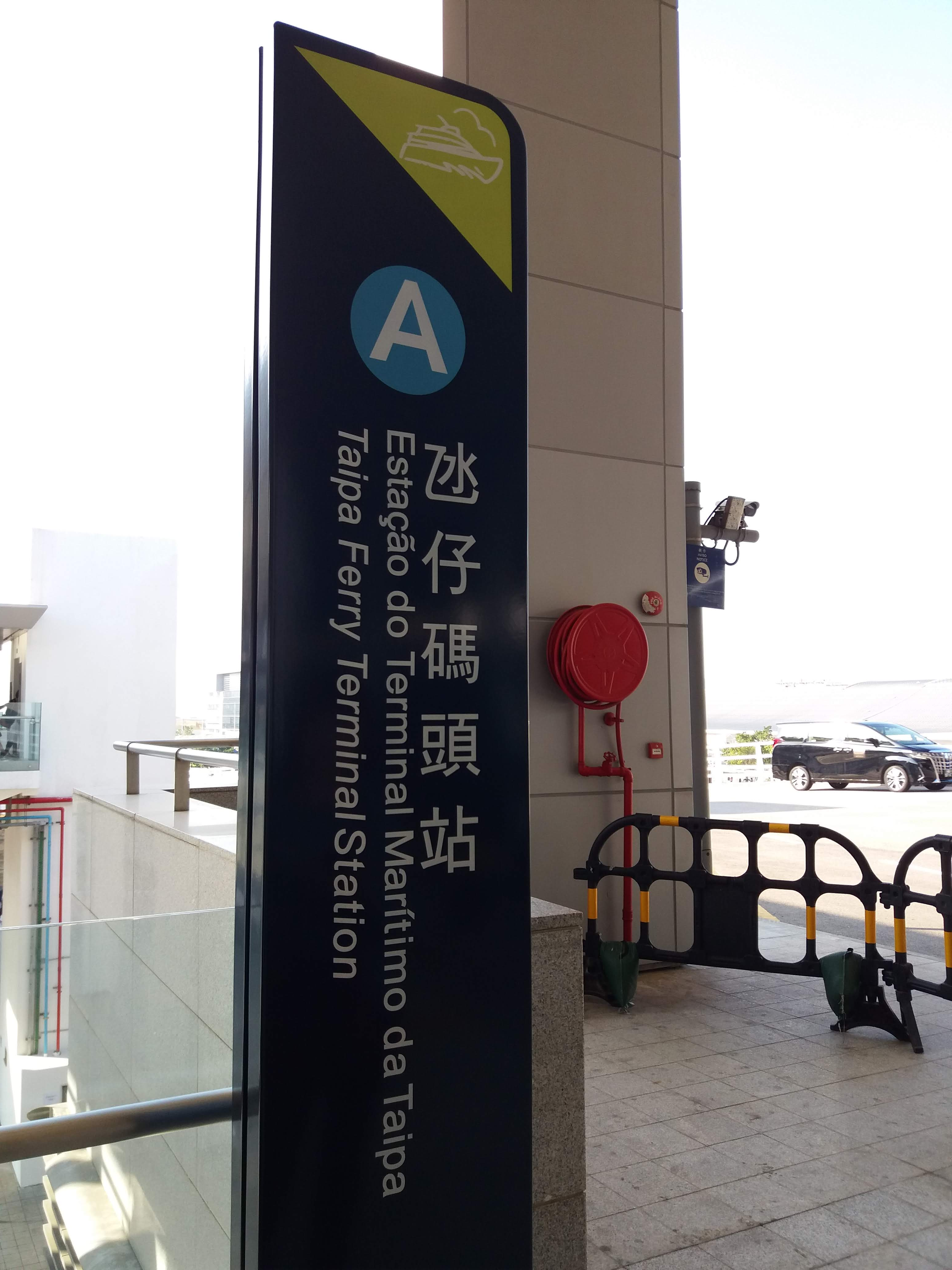
Exit A of Taipa Ferry Terminal station of Taipa line

There is a bus stand outside the pier, as well as a taxi stand. The pier is situated very close to Macau International Airport.

There are also buses to the casinos and resorts.

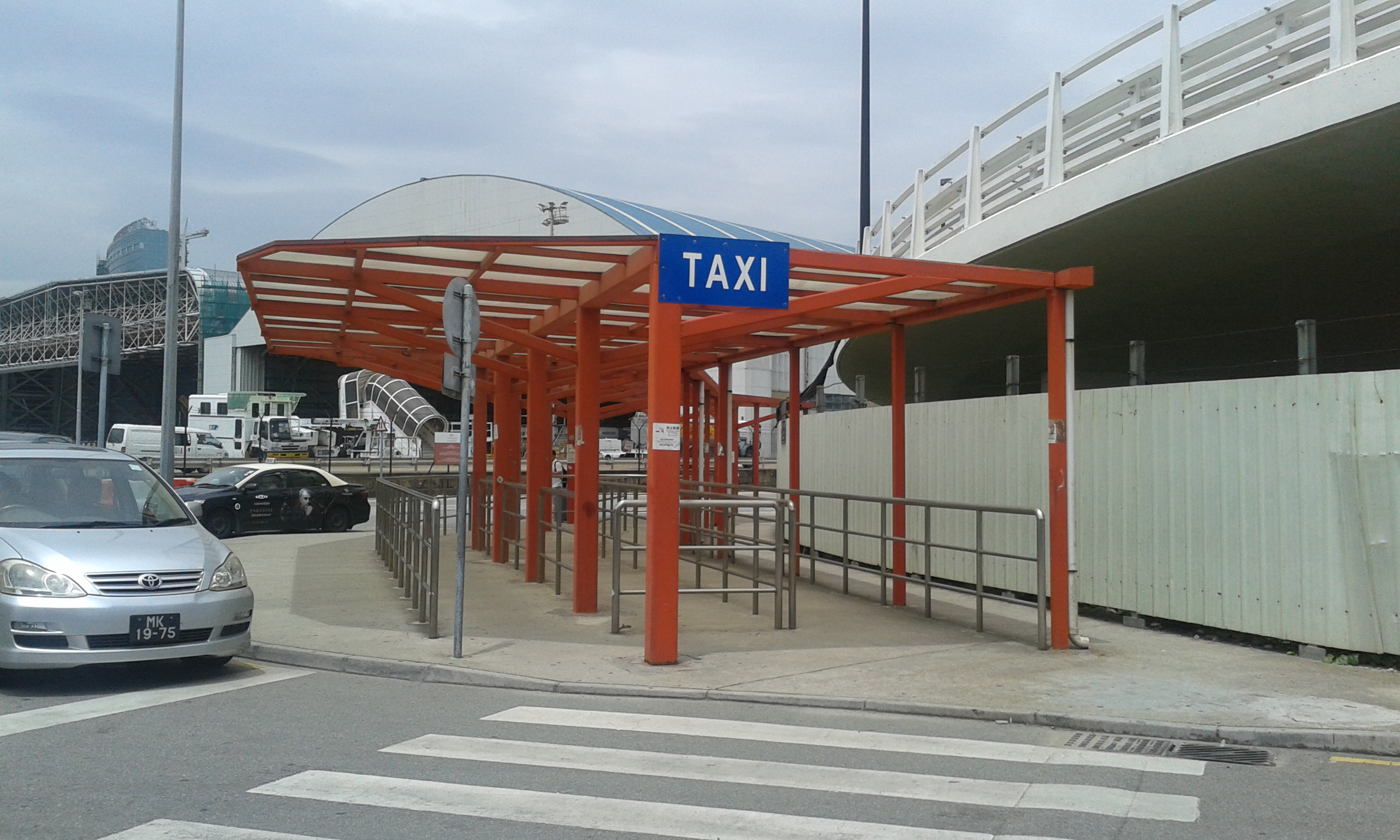
Taxi Stand at the Temporary Taipa Ferry Terminal

Taipa Ferry Terminal station on the Taipa line of the Macau Light Rail Transit is located next to the ferry terminal with a covered walkway connection.

== See also ==
- Pearl river (aka Zhujiang River)
- Transport in Macau
- Chu Kong Passenger Transport
- Transmac
- TCM (Macau)
