= Sands Casino (disambiguation) =

Sands Casino typically refers to the Sands Hotel on the Las Vegas Strip.

Sands Casino may also refer to:

- Las Vegas Sands Corporation – Las Vegas, Nevada
- Marina Bay Sands – Singapore
- Sands Atlantic City – Atlantic City, New Jersey, United States
- Sands Casino Resort Bethlehem – Bethlehem, Pennsylvania, United States (now Wind Creek Bethlehem)
- Sands Macao – Macau, China
- Sands Regency – Reno, Nevada
- Sands San Juan (now InterContinental San Juan Resort & Casino) – San Juan, Puerto Rico
