= Sands China =

Macau gambling company

Sands China Limited 金沙中國有限公司
- Type: Public
- Traded as: SEHK: 1928; Hang Seng Index component
- Industry: Hospitality, tourism
- Founded: 2009; 17 years ago
- Headquarters: Macau,
- Area served: Global
- Key people: Robert Glen Goldstein (chairman, CEO, Executive Director); Wong Ying Wai (president & Executive Director)
- Products: Gambling, hotels, entertainment, casinos, resorts
- Revenue: US$6.6 billion (2016)
- Owner: Las Vegas Sands (69.9%)
- Website: www.sandschina.com

Sands China Limited (Chinese: 金沙中國有限公司) is an integrated resort developer and operator in Macau and a majority-owned subsidiary of Las Vegas Sands Corporation.

== Properties ==
Sands China mainly operates in six segments in Macau: The Venetian Macao, Sands Macao, The Plaza Macao, The Londoner Macao, The Parisian Macao, Cotai Water Jet and other operations. Its business involves gaming areas, meeting space, convention and exhibition halls, retail and dining areas and entertainment venues.
