= Cotai Strip =

Area in Macau

Coordinates: 22°8′26″N 113°33′47″E

- 路氹金光大道; Faixa de Cotai
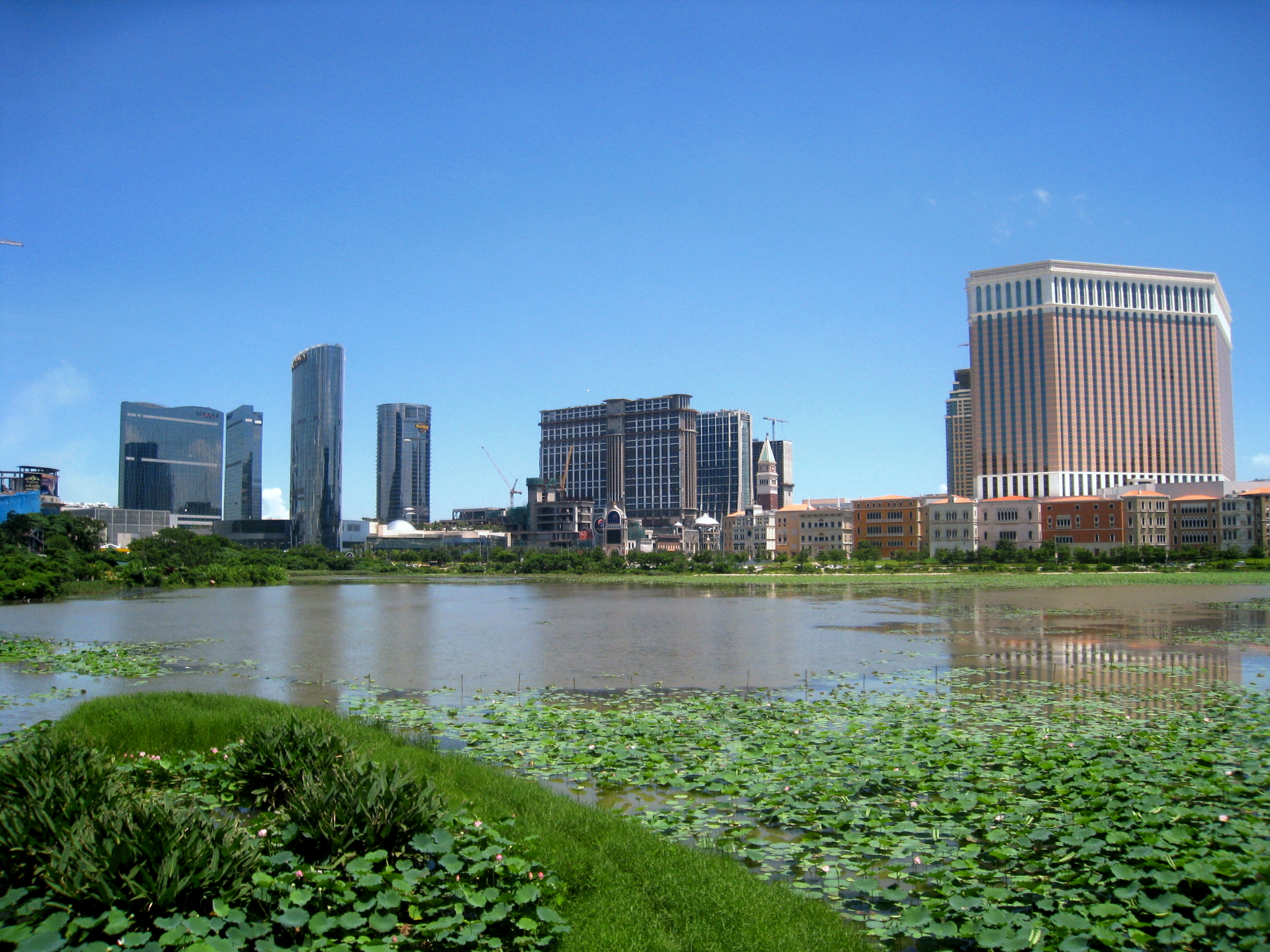
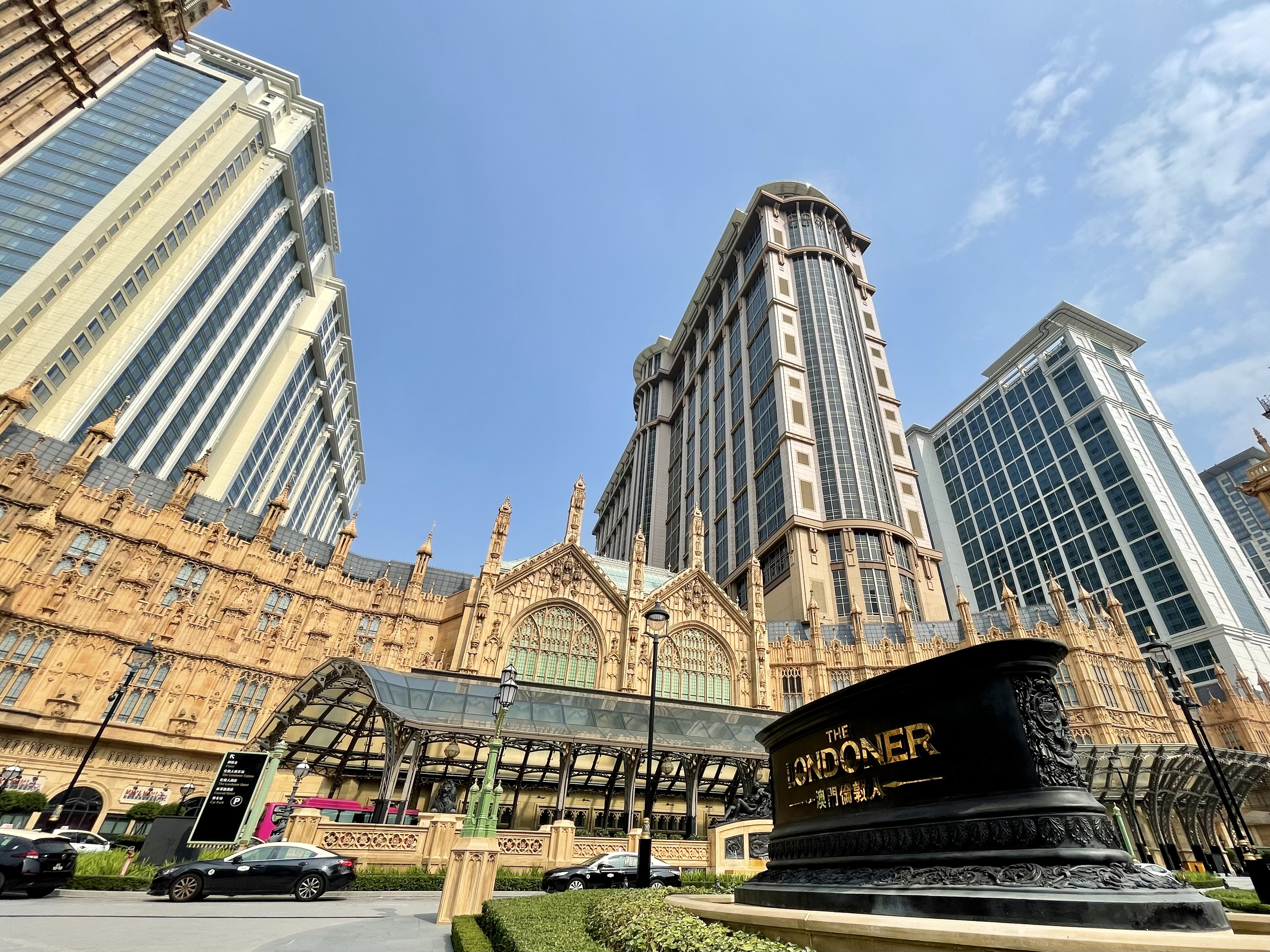
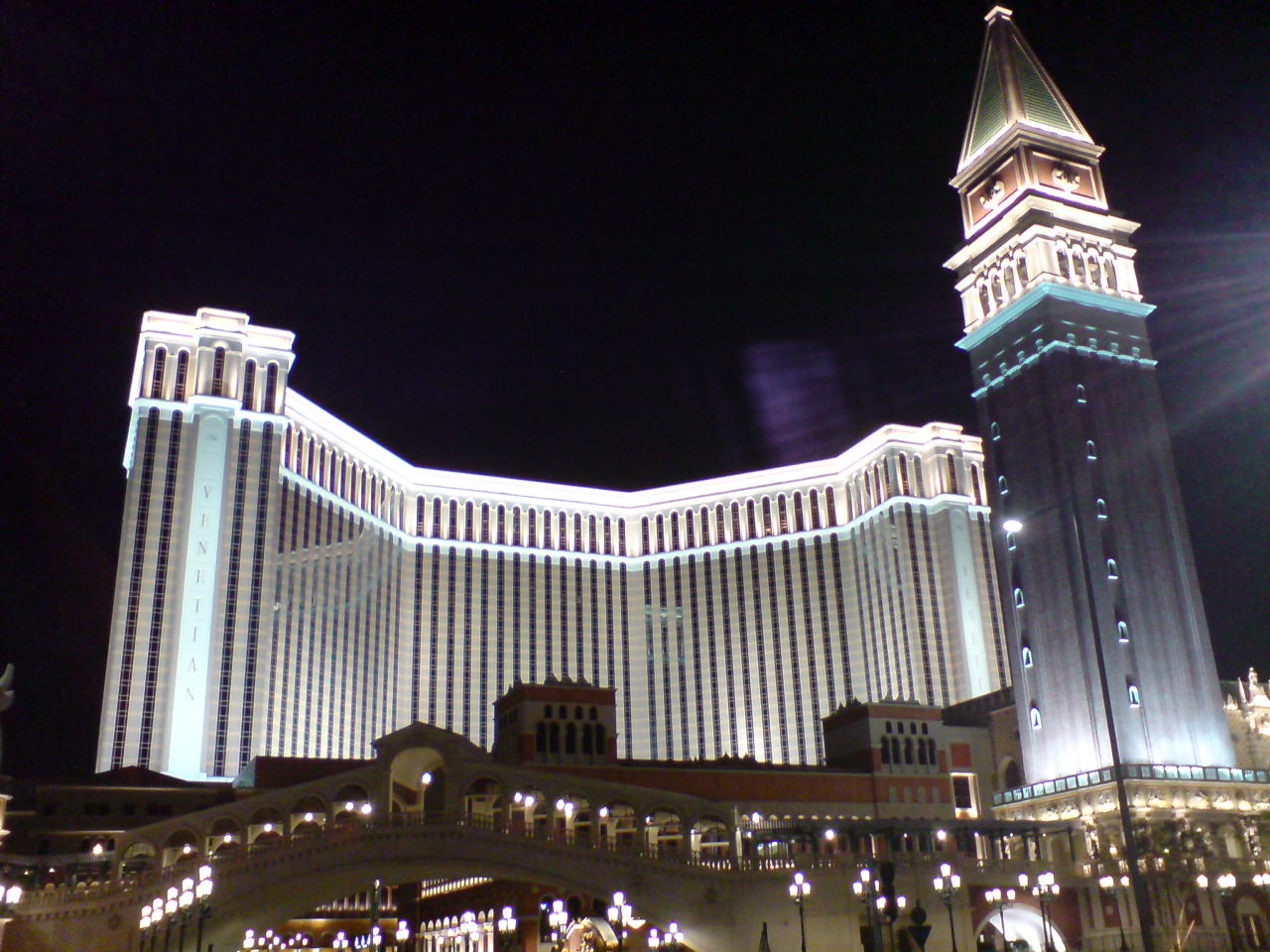
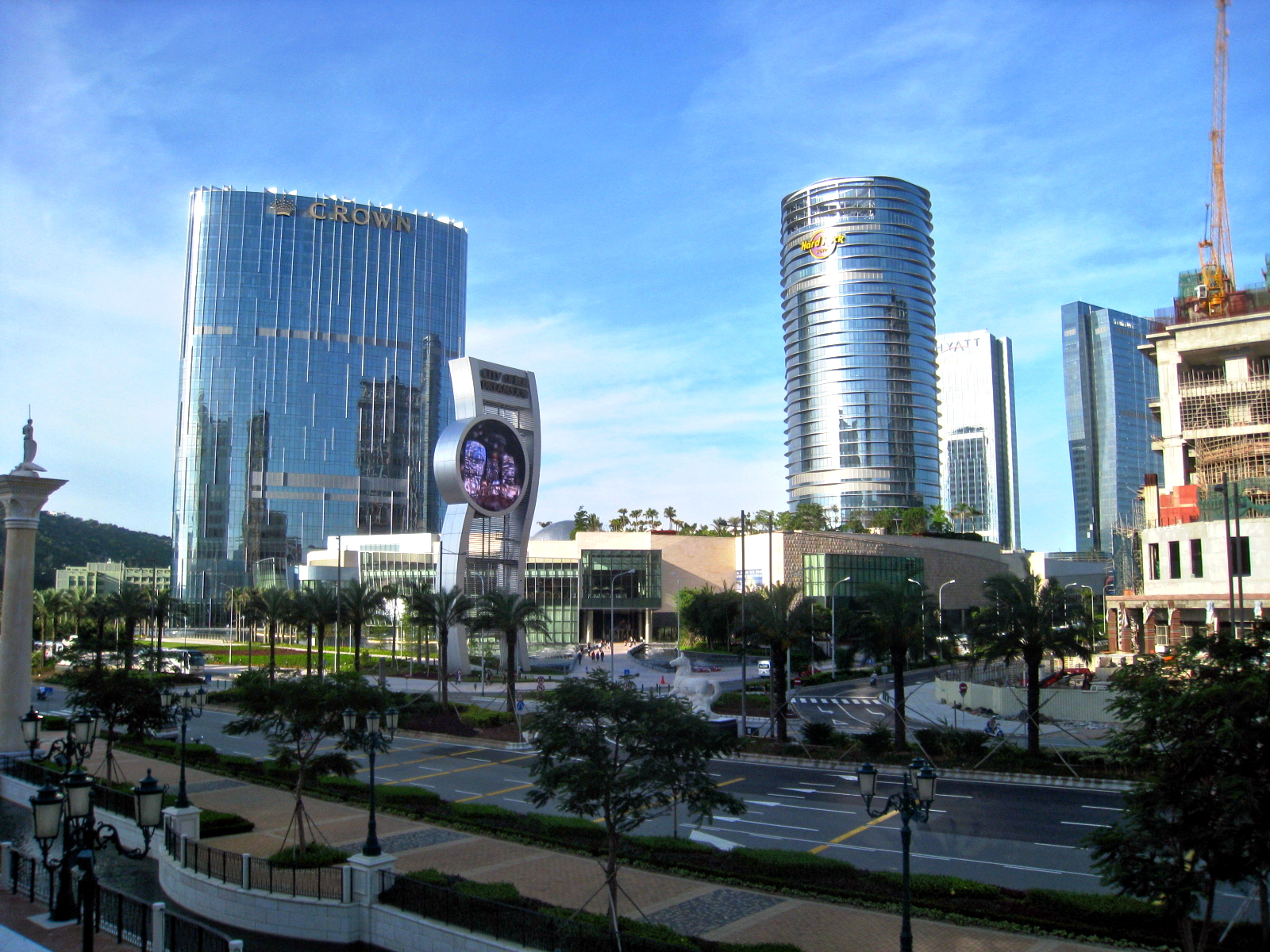
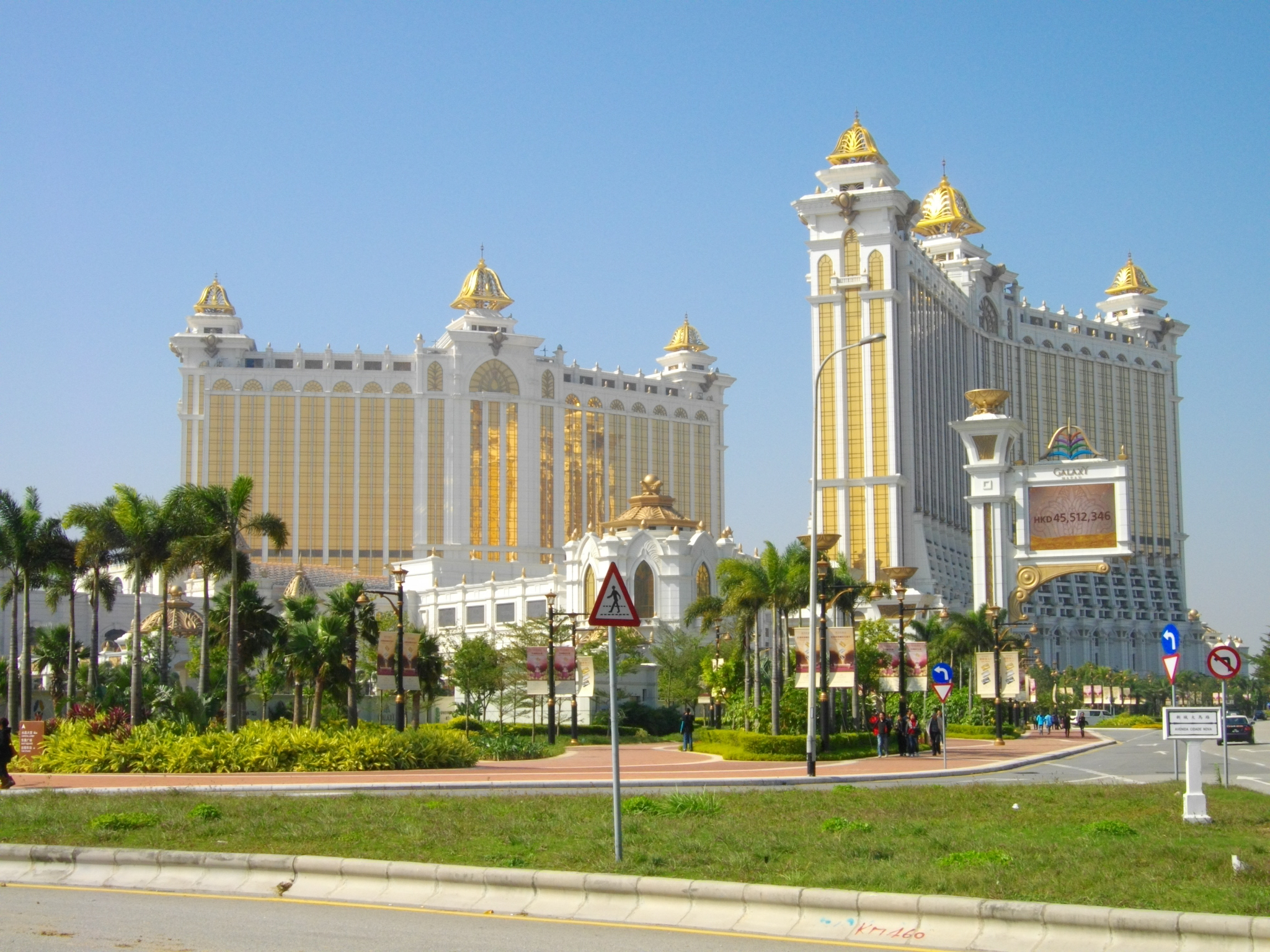
- Clockwise from top: Cotai Strip, The Venetian Macao, Galaxy Macau, City of Dreams, and The Londoner Macao.
- Interactive map of Cotai Strip

Cotai Strip

Chinese name
- Chinese: 路氹金光大道
Transcriptions
Standard Mandarin
- Hanyu Pinyin: Lùdàng Jīnguāng Dàdào
Yue: Cantonese
- Jyutping: lou6 tam5 gam1 gwong1 daai6 dou6

Portuguese name
- Portuguese: Faixa de Cotai

The Cotai Strip is an area known mostly for its hotel-casinos in the central portion of Cotai, Macau. The term was coined by the Las Vegas Sands Corporation in reference to its construction of a strip.

Cotai was the result of a major land reclamation project which joined the two islands of Coloane and Taipa and forms part of the Macau government's continuous efforts to expand the region's territory. The reclaimed land in Cotai has been mainly used for the development of casinos.

Over the past few decades, the layout of the Cotai Strip has also slowly developed into a grid-like layout with major hotels and casinos, not directly connected to the 'strip' as opposed to Las Vegas Strip where the majority of major hotels and casinos have front access to the strip.

== Naming ==
The United States Patent and Trademark Office granted Sheldon Adelson's Las Vegas Sands Corporation a trademark on the term Cotai Strip. The name 'Cotai' was formed by combining the first letters of the islands of Coloane and Taipa.

== History ==
=== Creation ===
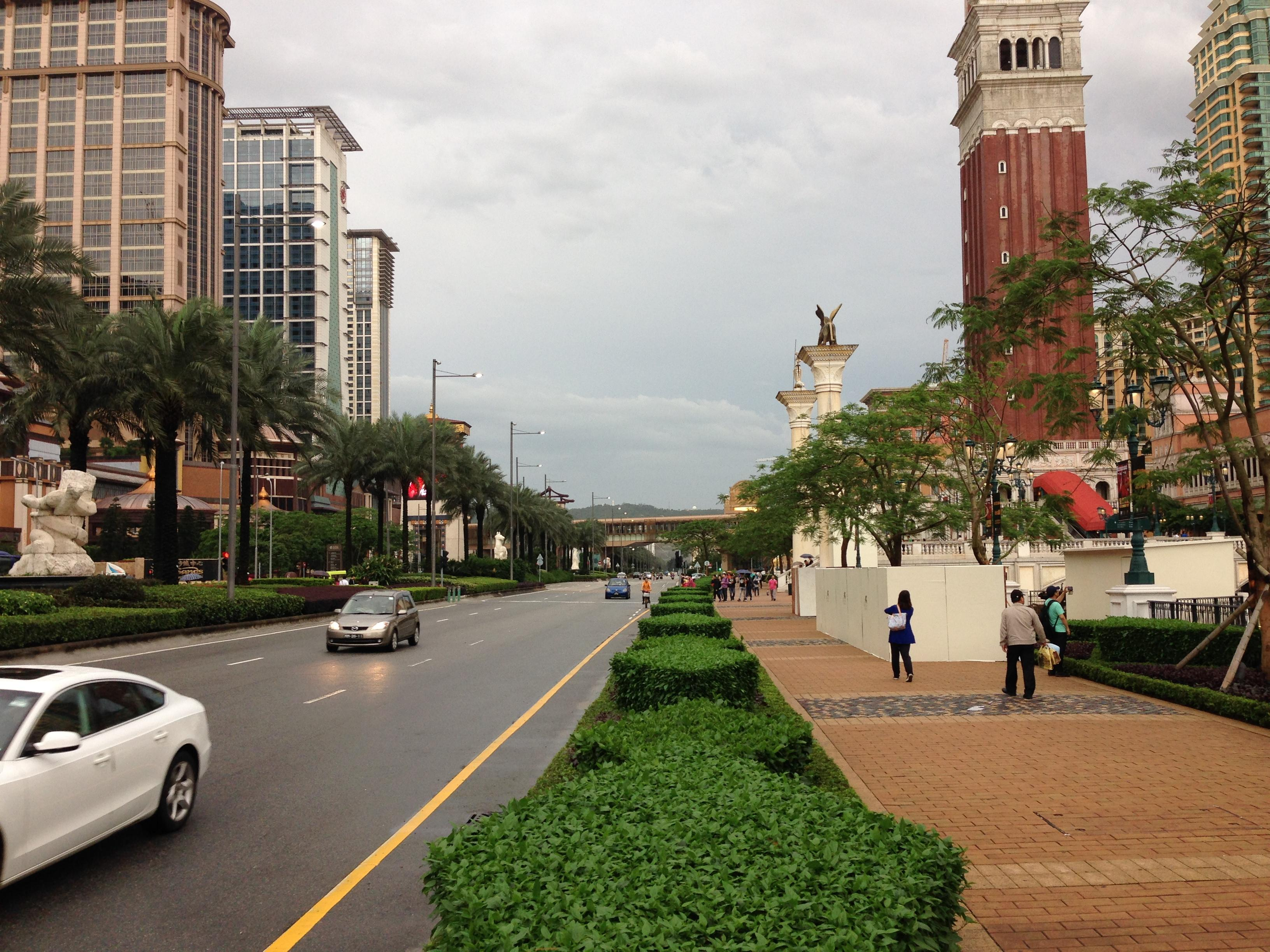
Cotai Strip 2014

The Cotai Strip is a term coined by the American company Las Vegas Sands Corporation, referring to its construction of a strip of hotel-casinos in the Cotai section of Macau, a special administrative region of the People's Republic of China. The Cotai Strip was built upon a 5.2 square kilometer land reclamation site in the Seac Pai Bay of the Pearl River Estuary. The strip joins the formerly separate islands of Taipa and Coloane.

The Grand Waldo Hotel, owned by Galaxy Entertainment Group, was the first casino to commence operations in Cotai, which commenced operations in May 2006. The construction of many other casino and hotel projects is currently underway. The largest property on Cotai is The Venetian Macao, which opened its doors on August 28, 2007.

=== Economic Crisis (2008-2010) ===
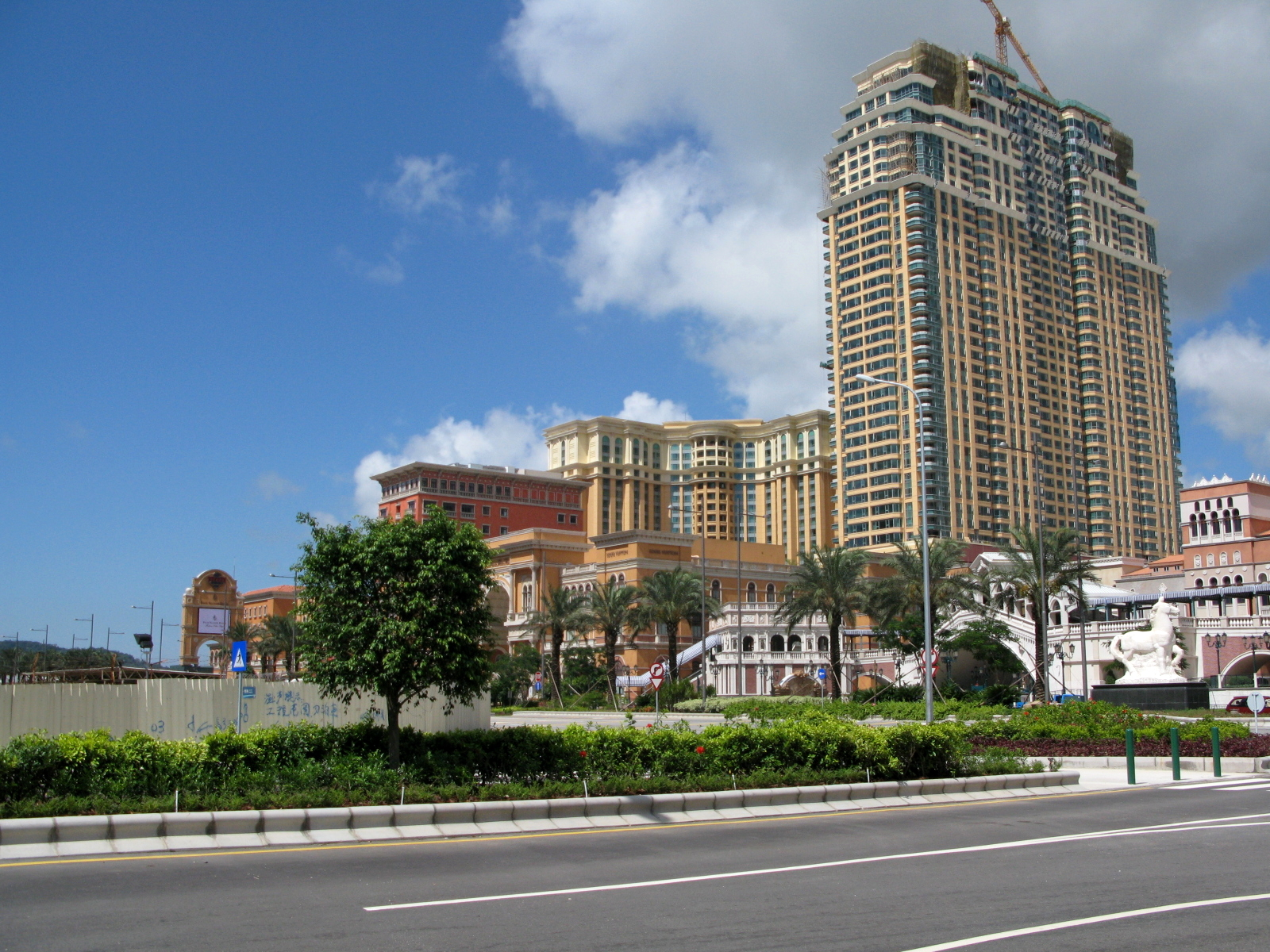
The Plaza Macao 2009

Due to the 2008 financial crisis, as many as 11,000 construction workers were set to lose their jobs as the US gaming giant Las Vegas Sands scaled back its development in Macau. Stephen Weaver, Sands' president for Asia, said up to 11,000 workers lost their jobs in Macau after the company halted building projects in the city such as the developments of Plots 5 and 6, previously Sands Cotai Central, now The Londoner Macao, on the strip. Las Vegas Sands had instead, focused its construction work on the Marina Bay Sands Resort in Singapore.

On November 30, 2009, Las Vegas Sands announced that it had secured $1.75 billion to complete its development of Sands Cotai Central, which was abandoned with 65% completed in mid-2008. Sands Cotai Central was completed in phases from 2012 to 2015 before being rebranded to The Londoner Macao in 2021.

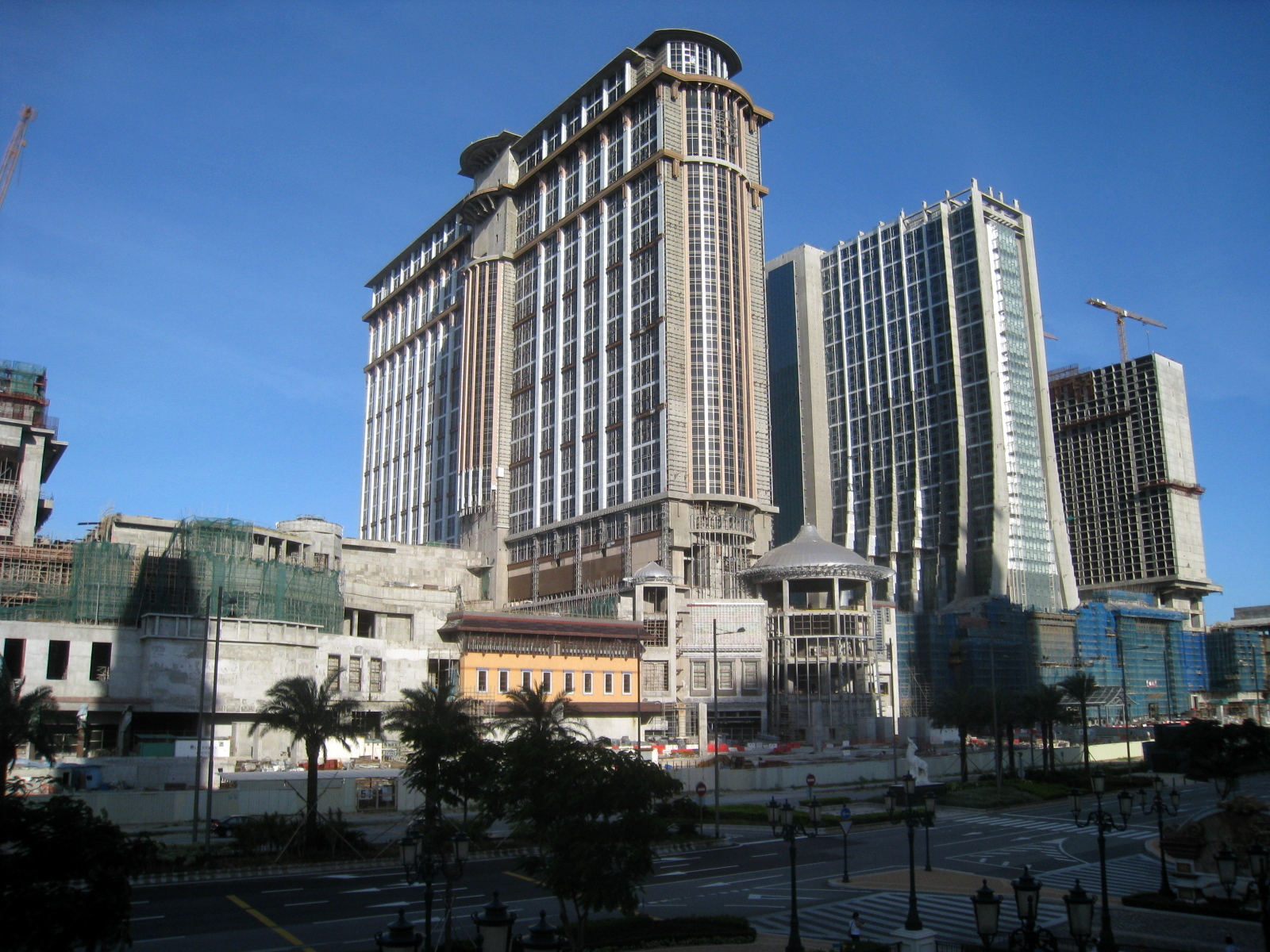
The Londoner Macao

No information was released about Plots 3, 7, and 8. It was very likely these would be cancelled. Macao's Director of the Lands, Public Works, and Transport Bureau (DSSOPT), Jaime Carion, said on 5 December 2010, that the Government is now looking at developing non-gaming projects in Cotai. He emphasized that the Sands China application procedure for Plots 7 and 8 was not fully complete and that the Government would announce the result at the most convenient time.

Phase 1 of the Galaxy Macau was eventually opened on May 15, 2011, followed by Phase 2 on May 27, 2015.

=== Recent Developments ===
The Plaza Macao, housing the Four Seasons Macao, opened a 40-story all-suite tower in October 2020. The tower, associated with the Four Seasons Macao, is branded as the Grand Suites at Four Seasons, comprising 289 suites. Sands Cotai Central was officially rebranded to The Londoner Macao when its first phase of rebranding works was completed on February 8, 2021. As of 2024, several new hotel-casinos have opened in Cotai, including the Grand Lisboa Palace and the Lisboeta Macau.

== Transportation ==
=== Bus ===
Other than a number of public bus services serving the area, many of the hotels in Cotai provide free shuttle buses for guests and visitors. These shuttle buses ferry passengers from the Border Gate, Macau International Airport, Outer Harbour Ferry Terminal, Taipa Ferry Terminal, and HZMB Macau Port, to the hotels, and vice versa.

=== Macau Light Rapid Transit ===
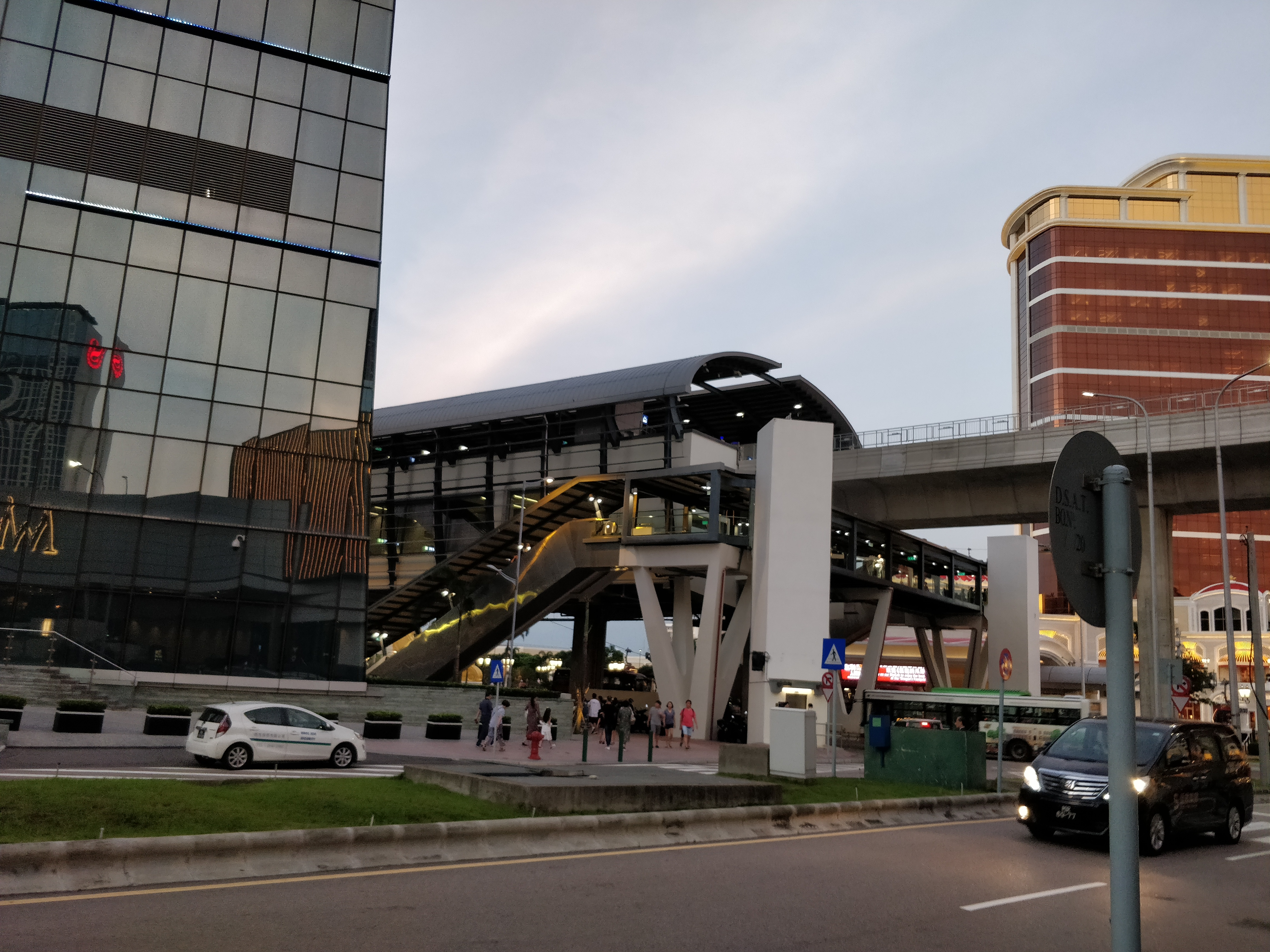
Cotai East Station

Opened on December 10, 2019, the Taipa section of the Macau Light Rapid Transit serves the Cotai Strip and the larger area of Cotai. The line has stations at nearly every hotel casino as it meanders through the peripheral road of the Cotai Strip.

Stations serving adjacent hotel casinos are as follows:

- Pai Kok Station - Galaxy Macau
- Cotai West Station - Galaxy Macau, Cotai Arena, Cotai Expo, The Venetian Macao, The Plaza Macao, The Parisian Macao, The Londoner Macao
- Lotus Checkpoint Station - Studio City Macau
- Cotai East Station - MGM Cotai, City of Dreams, Wynn Palace, The Londoner Macao

== Current properties ==
Property Name	Owner	Opened in	Features
The Venetian Macao	Las Vegas Sands Corporation	2007-08-28	Casino; The Venetian Macao Hotel; Paiza Suites; Cotai Arena; Cotai Expo; The Venetian Theatre; Shoppes at Venetian
The Plaza Macao	Las Vegas Sands Corporation	2008-08-28	The Plaza Casino; Four Seasons Hotel Macao; Grand Suites at Four Seasons; Paiza Mansions; Shops at Four Seasons
City of Dreams	Melco Resorts & Entertainment Limited	2009-06-01	Casino; Nüwa; Grand Hyatt Macau; The Countdown Hotel; Morpheus; Dancing Water Theatre; The Boulevard at City of Dreams; Morpheus Boutique
Galaxy Macau	Galaxy Entertainment Group	2011-05-15	Casino; Galaxy Hotel; Hotel Okura Macau; Banyan Tree Macau; The Ritz-Carlton Macau; JW Marriott Macau; Andaz Macau; Raffles at Galaxy Macau; The Grand Resort Deck; UA Galaxy Cinemas; The Promenade Shops
The Londoner Macao (formerly Sands Cotai Central)	Las Vegas Sands Corporation	2012-04-11	Himalaya Casino; Pacifica Casino; Conrad Macao; The Londoner Hotel including the Suites by David Beckham; Sheraton Grand Macao; St. Regis Macao; Crystal Palace Atrium; Londoner Court; Shoppes at Londoner (later phase); Londoner Arena (later phase)
Studio City Macau	Melco Resorts & Entertainment Limited	2015-10-27	Casino; Studio City Hotel; Studio City Event Center; Golden Reel; Batman Dark Flight; Legend Heroes Park; The Boulevard at Studio City
Broadway Macau (formerly Grand Waldo)	Galaxy Entertainment Group	2015-05-27	Casino; Broadway Hotel; Broadway Theatre
The Parisian Macao	Las Vegas Sands Corporation	2016-09-13	Casino; The Parisian Hotel; The Parisian Theatre; Macau Eiffel Tower; Shoppes at Parisian
Wynn Palace	Wynn Resorts Limited	2016-08-22	Casino; The Wynn Palace Hotel; Performance Lake; SkyCab Gondola; Wynn Palace Esplanade
MGM Cotai	MGM Resorts International	2018-02-13	Casino; MGM Cotai Hotel; MGM Theatre; The Spectacle; Retail Promenade
Lisboeta Macau	SJM Holdings	2021-07-17	The Lisboeta Hotel (later phase); Maison L'Occitane (later phase); CASA DE AMIGO (later phase); Macau Palace (recreated) (later phase); Emperor Cinemas (later phase); Retail Promenade (later phase); ZIPCITY Macau; GoAirborne Indoor SkyDiving Macau; Night Market @ Lisboeta
Grand Lisboa Palace	SJM Holdings	2021-07-31	Casino; Grand Lisboa Palace Macau Hotel; Palazzo Versace Macau (later phase); THE KARL LAGERFELD (later phase); The Bazar (later phase); New Yaohan Department Store (later phase); Macau Grand Lisboa Palace Shop (later phase)

== Future properties ==
=== Galaxy Macau Expansion Phases 3 and 4 ===
==== Galaxy International Convention Centre (Phase 3) ====
Scheduled to be completed in the second half of 2021, Galaxy Macau will see the addition of a large-scale 16,000-seat arena named Galaxy Arena, a 650-seat auditorium, 40,000 square meters of MICE space, including a 10,000-square meter pillarless exhibition hall, and a 700-room hotel tower to be operated by Andaz as part of its Phase 3 expansion - Galaxy International Convention Centre (GICC). Built adjacent to Macau Light Rapid Transit's Cotai West Station, GICC will be seamlessly integrated with the existing Galaxy Macau resort.

==== Raffles at Galaxy Macau (Phase 3) ====
Announced on 1 March 2021, Galaxy Macau will be adding the Raffles brand to its hotel portfolio as part of its Phase 3 expansion. To be housed in a new all-suites tower, the Raffles at Galaxy Macau will feature a glass airbridge connecting the two towers on every floor, a Mediterranean-inspired garden, an infinity edge pool, a luxury spa, and a fine dining restaurant. The hotel is scheduled to open in the second half of 2021.

==== Phase 4 ====
Scheduled to be completed in 2022, Phase 4 of Galaxy Macau's expansion will primarily be non-gaming focused and will add approximately 2,000 hotel rooms to the resort.

=== Studio City Macau Expansion Phase 2 ===
Scheduled to be completed by mid-2022, Phase 2 expansion of Studio City Macau will include two new hotel towers. Additional gaming space, a cineplex, an indoor water park, and facilities for meetings and exhibitions are also part of the expansion plans.

Under the terms of its land concession with the Macau SAR Government, Studio City Macau must complete its expansion by 31 May 2022. However, due to the COVID-19 pandemic, construction is likely to be delayed and Melco Resorts & Entertainment Limited has stated that the expansion is unlikely to be completed by the deadline.

=== Wynn Palace Expansion ===
Announced by Wynn Resorts Limited in 2019, the expansion of Wynn Palace will focus on adding non-gaming assets and two new hotel towers with a total of approximately 1,300 rooms.

A large glass and steel structure, named the Crystal Pavilion, housing an immersive performance space will be built adjacent to the existing Wynn Palace. Furthermore, a 650-room hotel tower will be erected alongside. Non-gaming assets such as interactive sculptures, gardens, and a gourmet food pavilion are also part of the expansion plans.

Phase 1 is estimated to cost US$2 billion, with construction expected to begin in 2021 and completed by 2024.

Another hotel tower will be built as part of Phase 2. Further details on this phase have yet to be released.

=== MGM Cotai Expansion Phase 2 ===
First mentioned by MGM China Holdings Limited in 2018, a few months after the inauguration of MGM Cotai, an all-new additional south hotel tower has been planned as part of MGM Cotai's expansion plans. The existing retail podium will also be expanded to allow for more recreation and entertainment options. The foundations for the expansion have already been built when constructing the MGM Cotai previously.

In 2019, the chief executive of MGM China Holdings Limited, Grant Bowie, announced that the expansion will only be likely from 2021 or beyond.

=== Redevelopment of City of Dreams ===
Announced by Melco Resorts & Entertainment Limited in 2019, City of Dreams will undergo a makeover with a revamp of its hotel properties. With renovation works begun, Nüwa Hotel will be extensively refurbished after being renamed and rebranded from the former Crown Towers. In addition, three new villas will be added to the Morpheus Hotel. The Countdown Hotel, formerly Hard Rock Hotel, will also be revamped and renamed Libertine. Works for these redevelopments are scheduled to be completed in 2021.

=== Theme Park and Resort ===
The Macau Theme Park and Resort Ltd, controlled by Angela Leong On Kei, has said that it intends to build a MOP 10.4 billion family-oriented amusement resort and hotels in Cotai. According to a press statement, the integrated resort project will be developed in three phases and each of them will take about two and a half to three years to complete.

SJM Holdings is in talks with Macau Theme Park and Resort Ltd to try to find a way for both companies to cooperate on Cotai, chief executive officer, Ambrose So Shu Fai, revealed on 16 December 2010. Stanley Ho's SJM is still waiting for the Government to approve the application for a plot in Cotai, which sits just beside the Macau Dome and the land where the company, headed by businesswoman and lawmaker Angela Leong On Kei – who is also Stanley Ho's fourth wife and SJM's director –, is set to build the theme park. "We are not a shareholder in the theme park development, but we did talk with Angela Leong, who is developing that theme park, to see if there is a synergy between the two plots of land," So told reporters.

As of 2021, a portion of the land has been developed as Lisboeta Macau, a Macau-themed integrated resort, by Macau Theme Park and Resort Ltd.

=== The Jumeirah Macau Hotel ===
First announced in 2008 by Shun Tak Group, Dubai-based Jumeirah Group will manage and operate Macau's first ultra luxury hotel. The Jumeirah Macau Hotel is a 250-room five-star hotel to be located across from the Macau East Asian Games Dome. Initially scheduled to be opened in 2013, the site remains unused and there have been no further information on the project as of date.

=== Plots 7 and 8 ===
Sands China's application for Cotai plots 7 and 8 was submitted after a freeze on gaming land concession was announced back in 2008, secretary for Economy and Finance, Francis Tam Pak Yuen, explained on 15 December 2010 on the sidelines of a meeting at the Legislative Assembly. On the other hand, the three gaming operators Wynn Macau, MGM Macau and SJM Holdings who are yet to be granted plots in Cotai have filed applications before that policy was stated. As such it is likely the land concession requests of will be approved, the secretary said. But the Land, Public Works and Transport Bureau (DSSOPT) director Jaime Carion told local media on Thursday 16 December 2010 that the plots 7 and 8 in Cotai will not be granted to either gaming operators SJM Holdings or Sands China. After the Government snub, Las Vegas Sands (LVS) has dropped its interest in developing plots 7 and 8 in Cotai. "If somebody else builds on [parcels] 7 and 8, I will be happy. Happier than if I were going to build on it," LVS chairman Sheldon Adelson said at the Bank of America Merrill Lynch Global Gaming Conference in Las Vegas, on 9 January 2011.

== See also ==
- Gambling in Macau
- Las Vegas Strip
- List of integrated resorts
