= The Parisian Macao =

Casino resort in Cotai, Macau

Coordinates: 22.1437°N 113.5607°E

- 澳門巴黎人 (Yue Chinese); O Parisiense Macau (Portuguese)

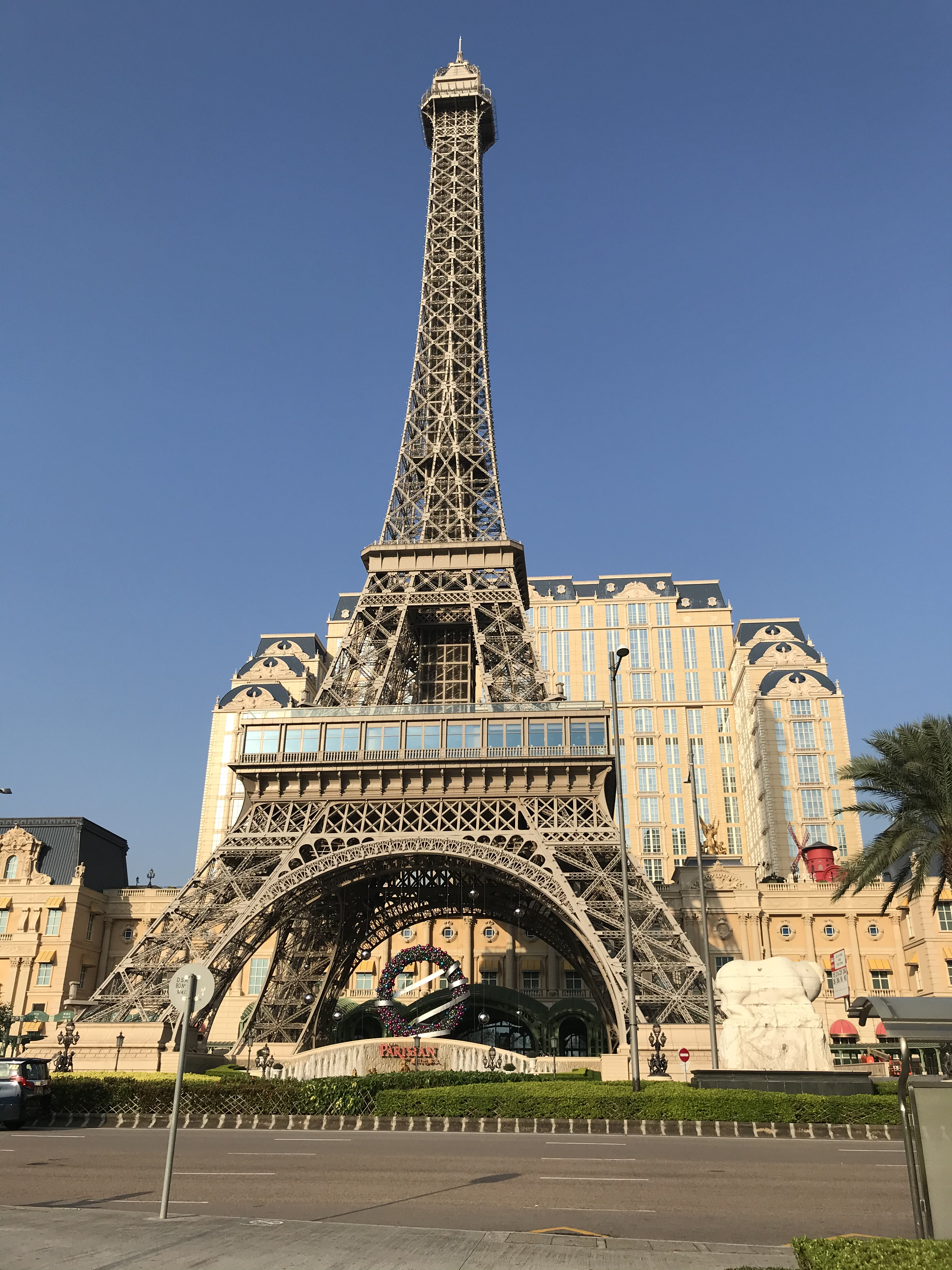
- Interactive map of The Parisian Macao
- Location: Cotai, Macau, SAR - China
- Opened: September 13, 2016; 10 years ago
- Theme: Paris, France
- No. of rooms: 2,541
- Casino type: Land-based
- Owner: Las Vegas Sands
- Website: www.parisianmacao.com

The Parisian Macao
- Traditional Chinese: 澳門巴黎人
- Simplified Chinese: 澳门巴黎人
Transcriptions
Standard Mandarin
- Hanyu Pinyin: Àomén Bālírén
Yue: Cantonese
- Jyutping: ou3 mun4*2 baa1 lai4 jan4

The Parisian Macao (Chinese: 澳門巴黎人) is a casino resort on the Cotai Strip in Cotai, Macau, China owned by Las Vegas Sands, which features a half-scale Eiffel Tower as one of its landmarks. It was originally expected to be operational in late 2015, with that later changed to August 2016. The hotel officially opened on 13 September 2016.

== History ==
=== Development and construction ===
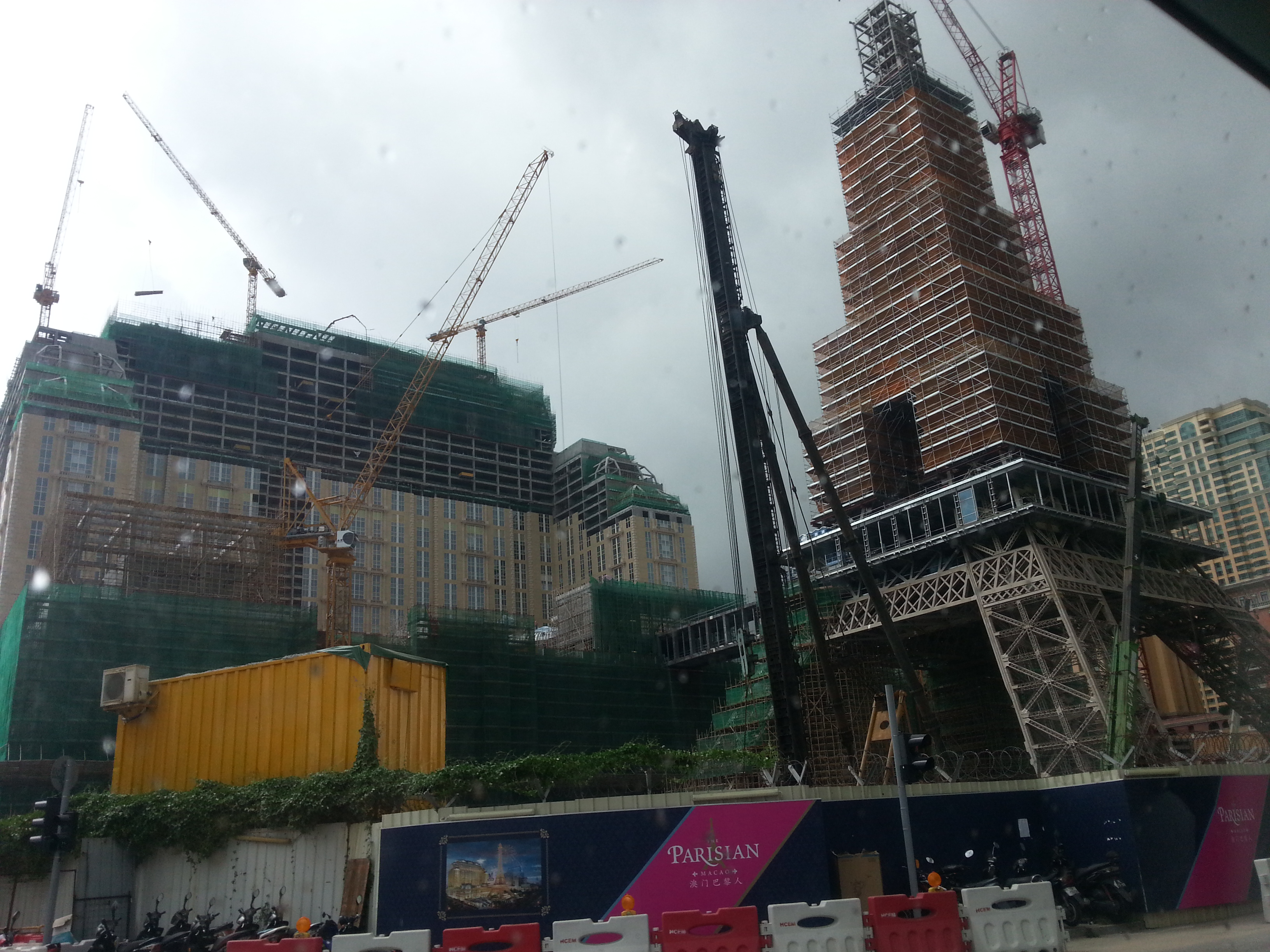
The Parisian under construction in August 2015.

The Parisian Macao was estimated to cost around $2.5 billion and is being funded by Las Vegas Sands with $1.5 billion in bank loans and $900 million to $1 billion in cash. The company will also have to pay a penalty of 900,000 patacas ($112,700) for the delay in developing the plot.

Construction began in February 2013.

=== Opening (2016) ===
Originally expected to be operational in late 2015, the completion of The Parisian Macao was delayed and finally opened in September 2016. However, its launch quarter results were below expectations.

=== Downsizing (2019) ===
In 2019, 600 rooms in The Parisian Macao were renovated to become 300 new suites to meet rising demands. This brings the total room count from the original 3,000 rooms and suites to approximately 2,700.

== Design ==
The Parisian Macao features a half-scale 160-metre Eiffel Tower as one of its landmarks.

The property has approximately 2,700 hotel rooms, 170 shops and 5,202 square metres of meeting space. In addition, the resort features a 1,200-seat theatre. For the first month of the hotel's opening, the theatre hosted Thriller Live, and hopes to attract more Broadway and West End performances.

The interior has a large fountain and atrium giving a feel of modern France. There are 150 gaming tables allotted to the property, of which 100 were allotted at launch and the next 50 will be allotted over the next years.

Shops in the retail arcade, Shoppes at Parisian include Adidas, Calvin Klein and Breitling.

== Transportation ==
=== Bus ===
There are several shuttle bus services connecting The Parisian Macao to Macau's major ports of entry and nearby resorts. These shuttle services are provided free of charge.

Buses travelling from B1 Bus Depot:

- The Parisian Macao to Border Gate
- The Parisian Macao to Hengqin Port
- The Parisian Macao to Sands Macao
- The Parisian Macao to Taipa Ferry Terminal
- The Parisian Macao to Macao Ferry Terminal
- The Parisian Macao to HZMB Macau Port
- The Parisian Macao to Macao Central District (Only from Friday to Sunday)

Buses travelling from Hotel Main Lobby

- The Parisian Macao to Macao International Airport

=== Macau Light Rapid Transit ===
The Parisian Macao is within walking distance from Cotai West Station on the Taipa section of the Macau Light Rapid Transit that serves the Cotai Strip and the larger area of Cotai.

== Gallery ==
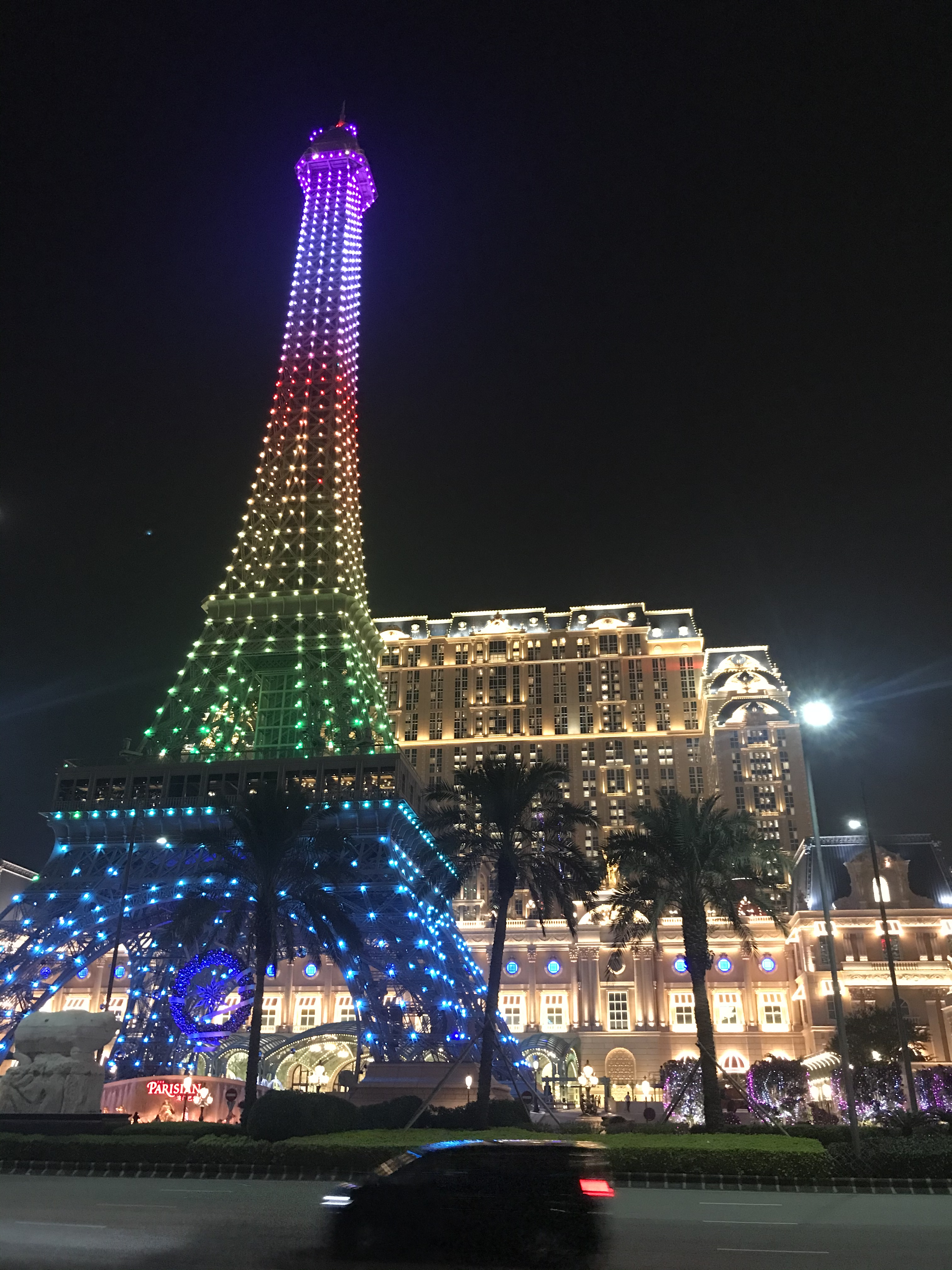
The Parisian Macao at night

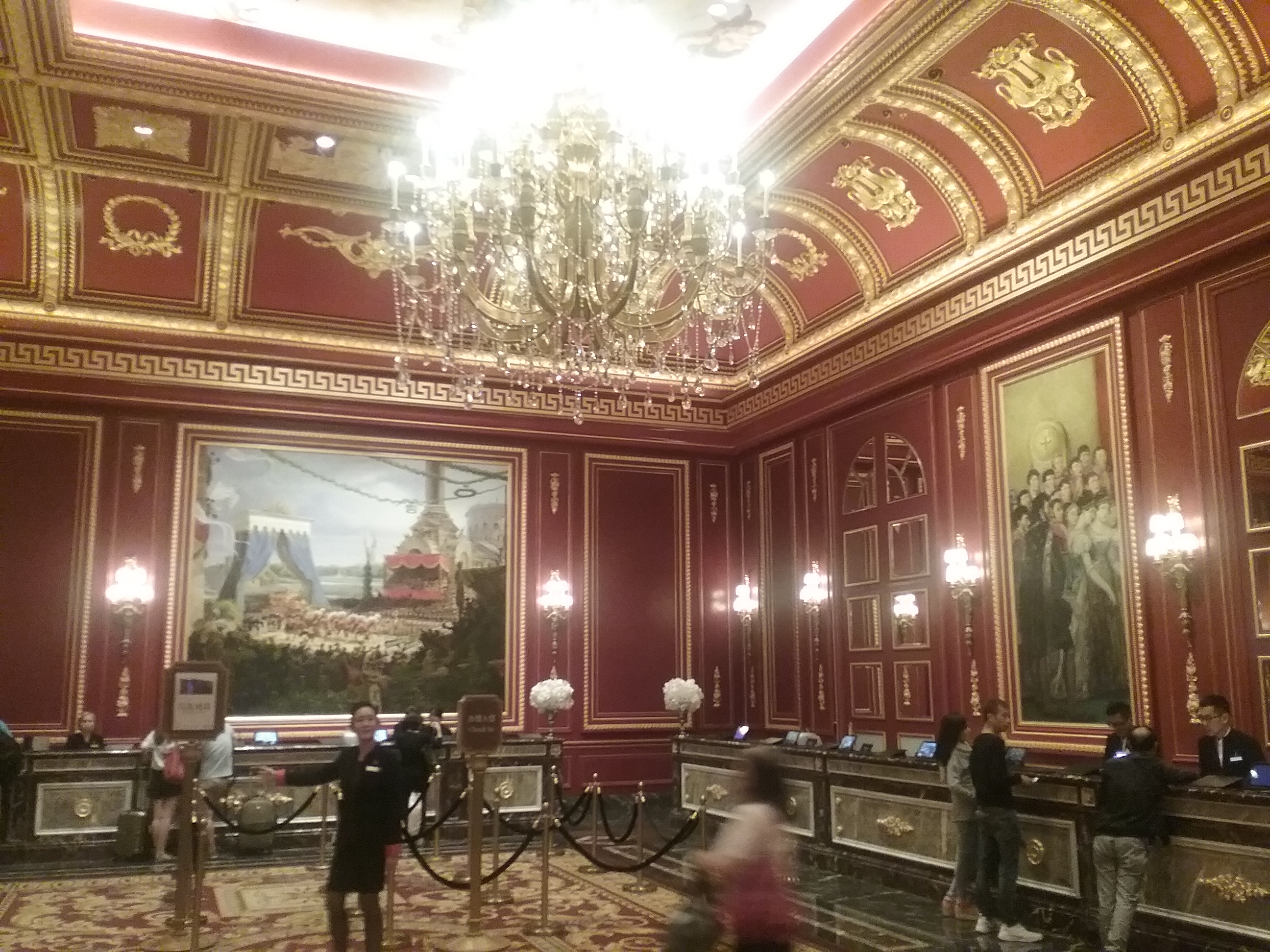
Hotel lobby

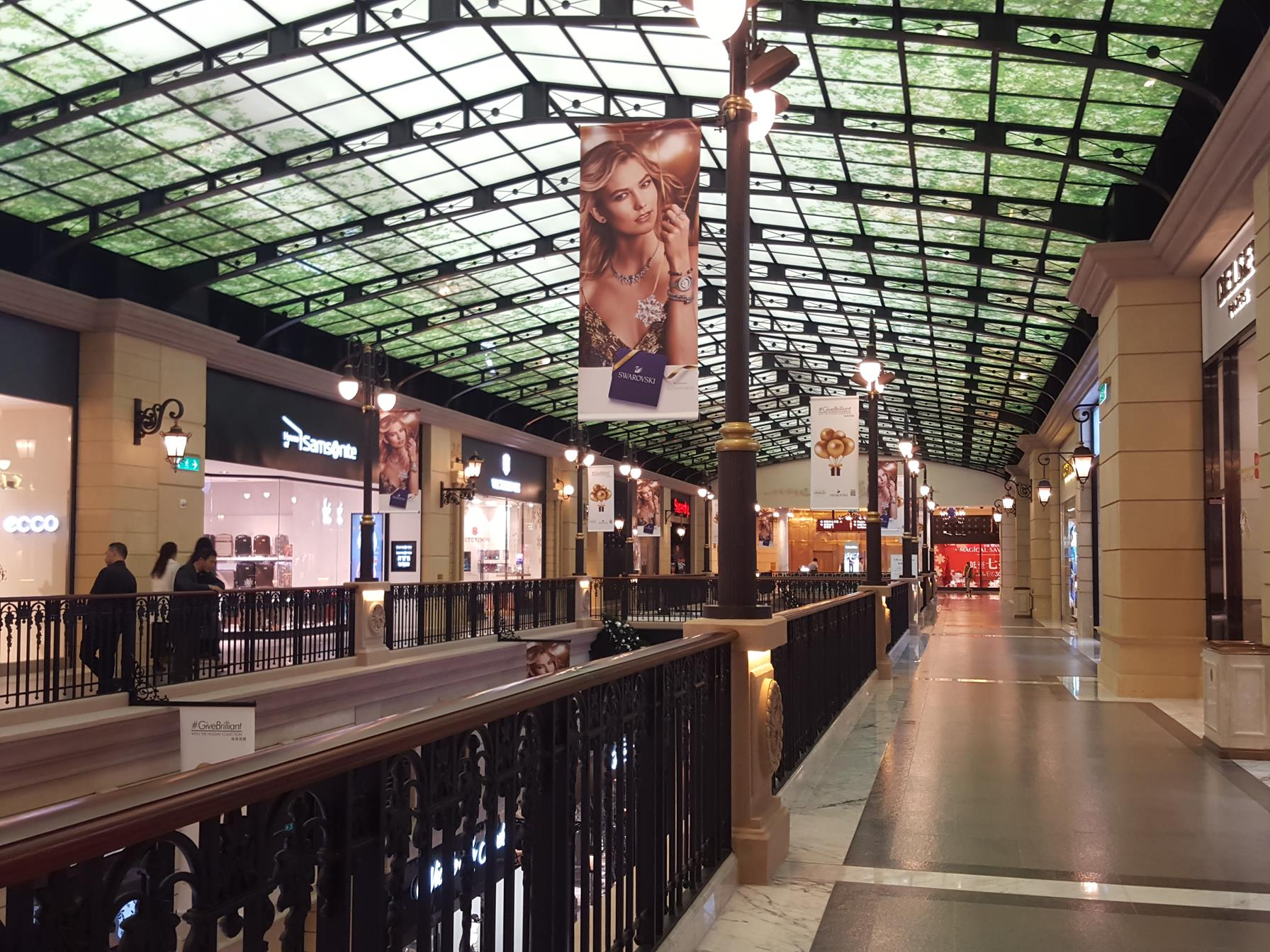
Retail area

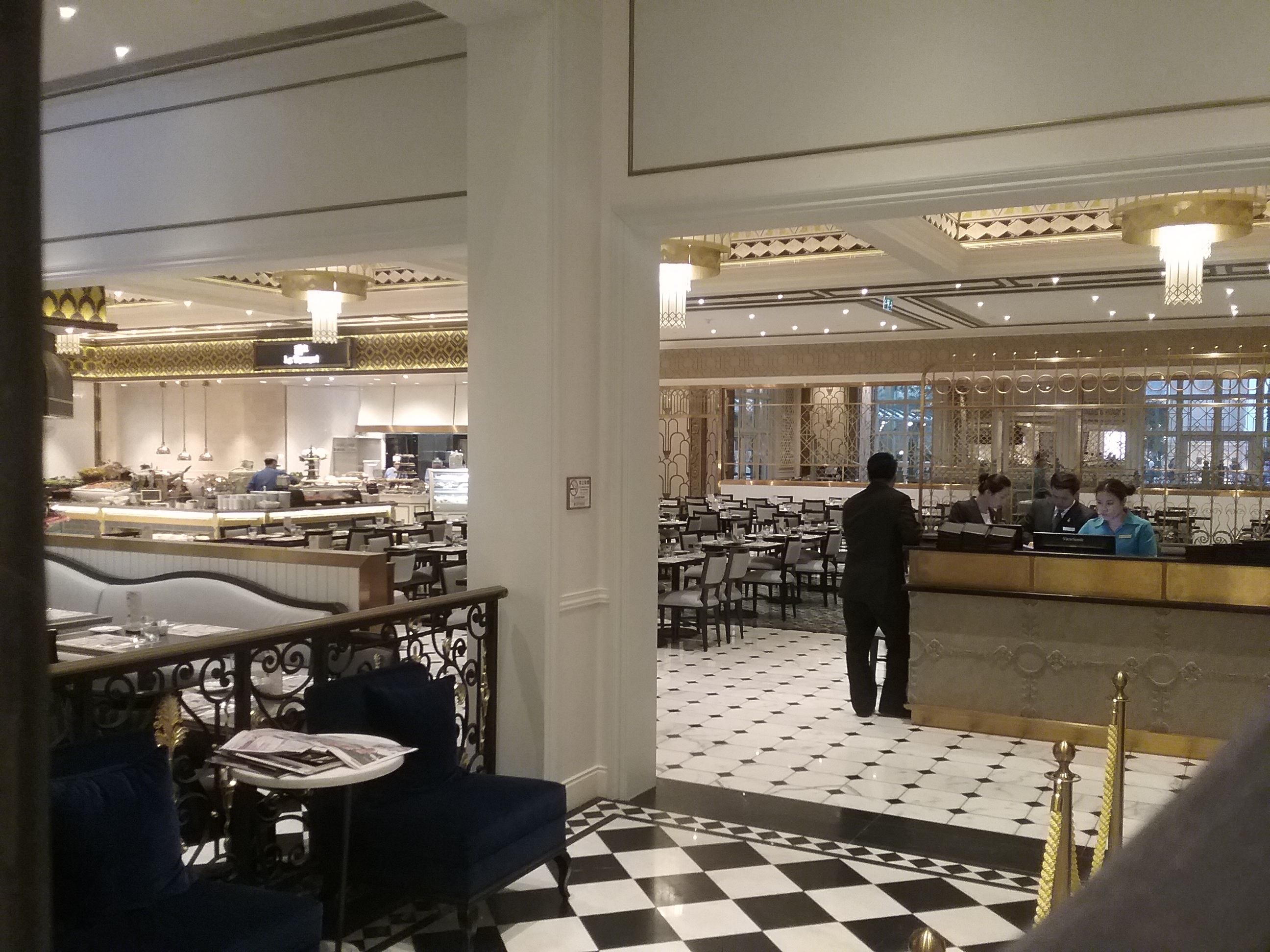
Le Buffet restaurant

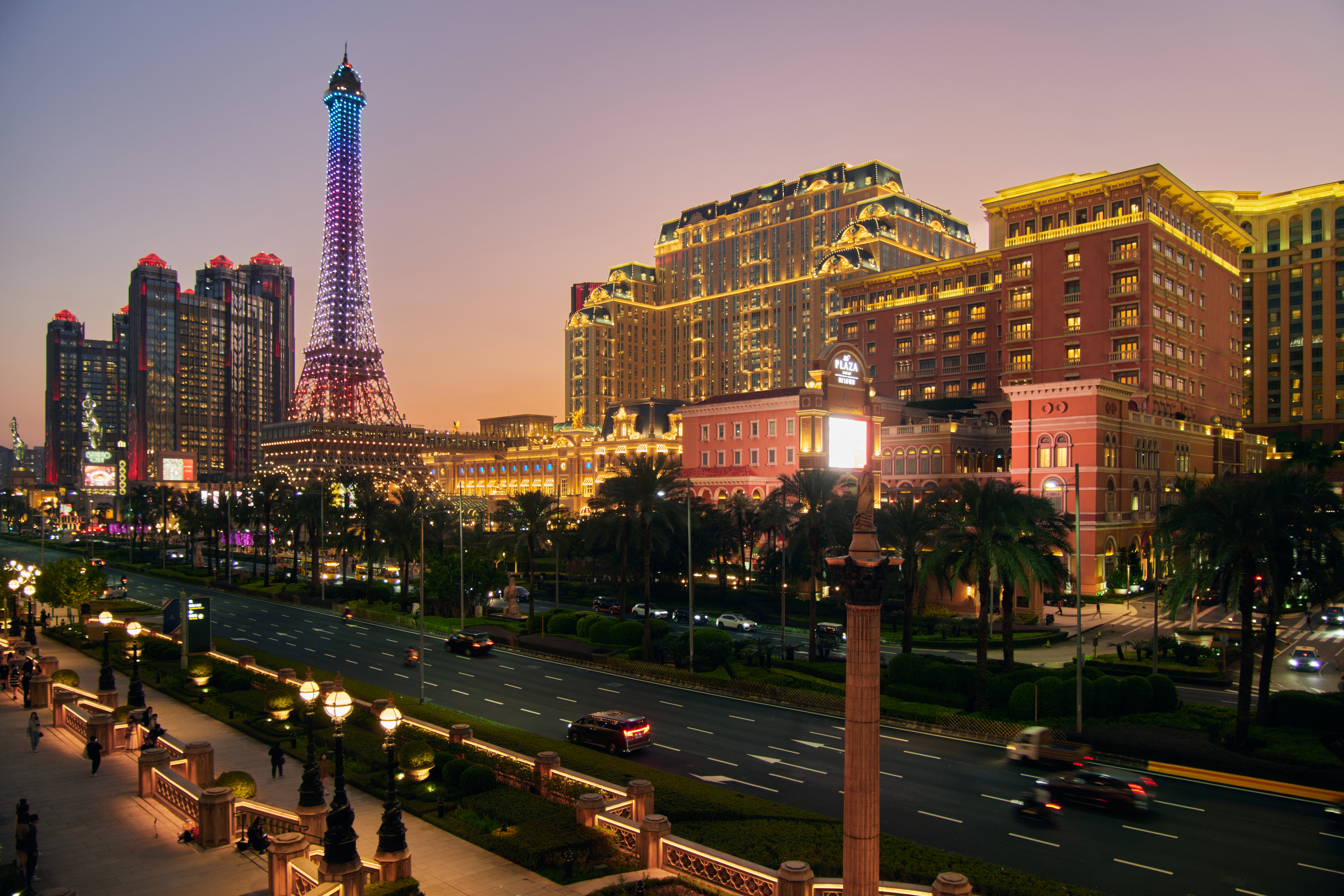
The Parisian complex at dusk

== See also ==
- Gambling in Macau
- List of properties on the Cotai Strip
- List of tallest buildings in Macau
- List of Macau casinos
- List of largest hotels
- List of integrated resorts
- Paris Las Vegas - similarly themed hotel on Las Vegas Strip, owned by Caesars Entertainment
