= Sands Macao =

Hotel and casino resort in Macau, China

Coordinates: 22°11′30″N 113°33′16″E

- 金沙娛樂場 (Yue Chinese); Areias Macau (Portuguese)

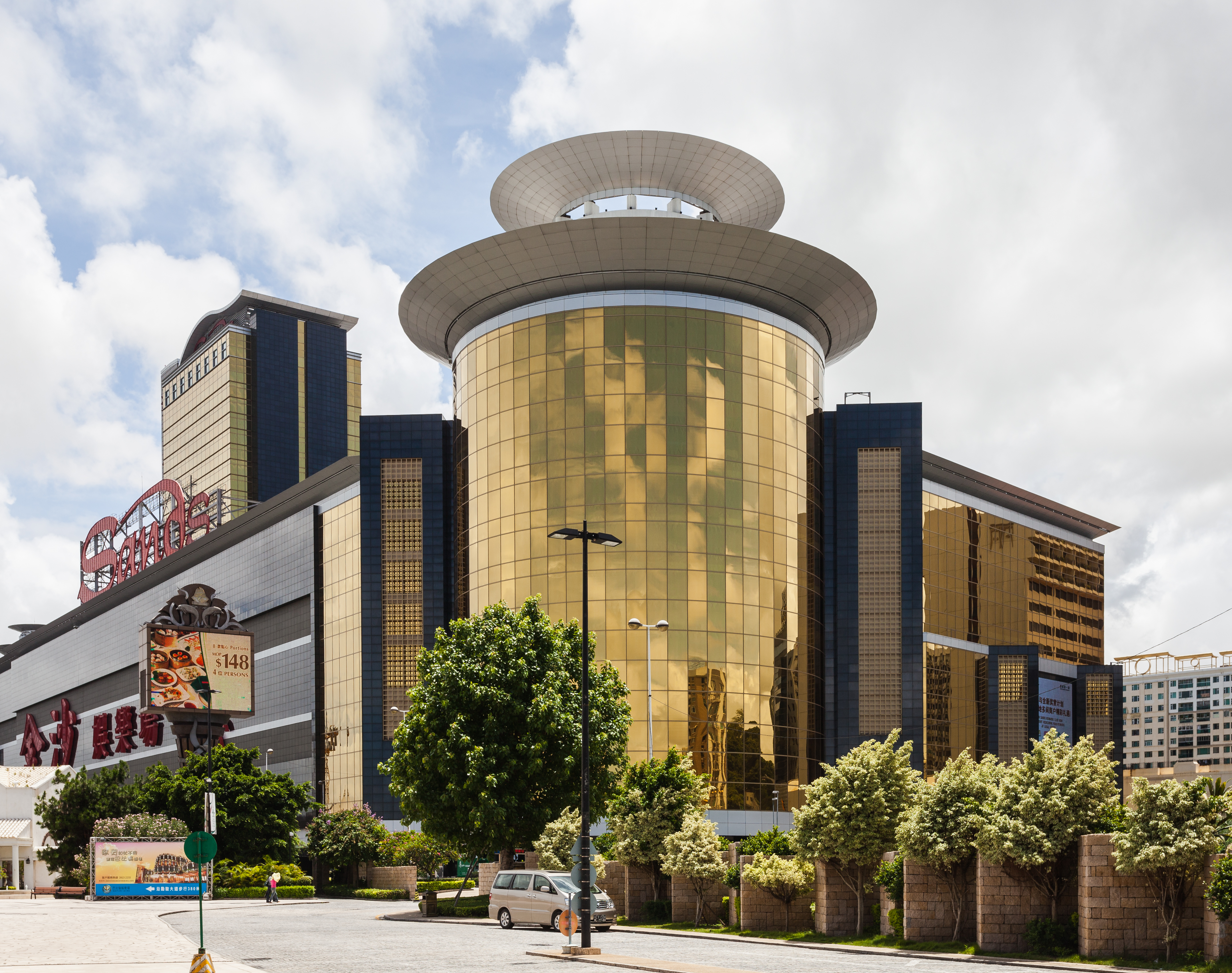
- Interactive map of Sands Macao
- Location: Sé, Macau
- Opened: May 18, 2004; 22 years ago
- Theme: Desert
- No. of rooms: 289
- Gaming space: 229,000 sq ft (21,300 m^{2})
- Casino type: Land-based
- Owner: Las Vegas Sands
- Architect: Aedas
- Website: Sands Macao

Sands Macao (Chinese: 金沙娛樂場) is a hotel and casino resort located in Sé, Macau, SAR - China. It is owned and operated by the Las Vegas Sands Corporation, and was designed by Steelman Partners, LLP. It comprises a 229,000 square feet (21,300 m^{2}) casino, and a 289-suite hotel.

== History ==
The casino opened on May 18, 2004 at a cost of $240 million. All of the mortgage bonds that were issued to finance construction were paid off in May 2005. In 2006, the casino completed an expansion increasing the casino from 165,000 sq ft (15,300 m^{2}) to 229,000 sq ft (21,300 m^{2}).

At the time of its opening, Las Vegas Sands chairman Sheldon Adelson had said that his company would soon be a mainly Chinese enterprise, and that Las Vegas should be called "America's Macau". The president and chief operating officer of Las Vegas Sands Corporation predicted on February 12, 2007 that Macau's gaming revenue has topped that of the Las Vegas Strip and will more than double again by 2010.

A new hotel tower opened in late 2007, bringing the property's total room count to 289.

== Gallery ==
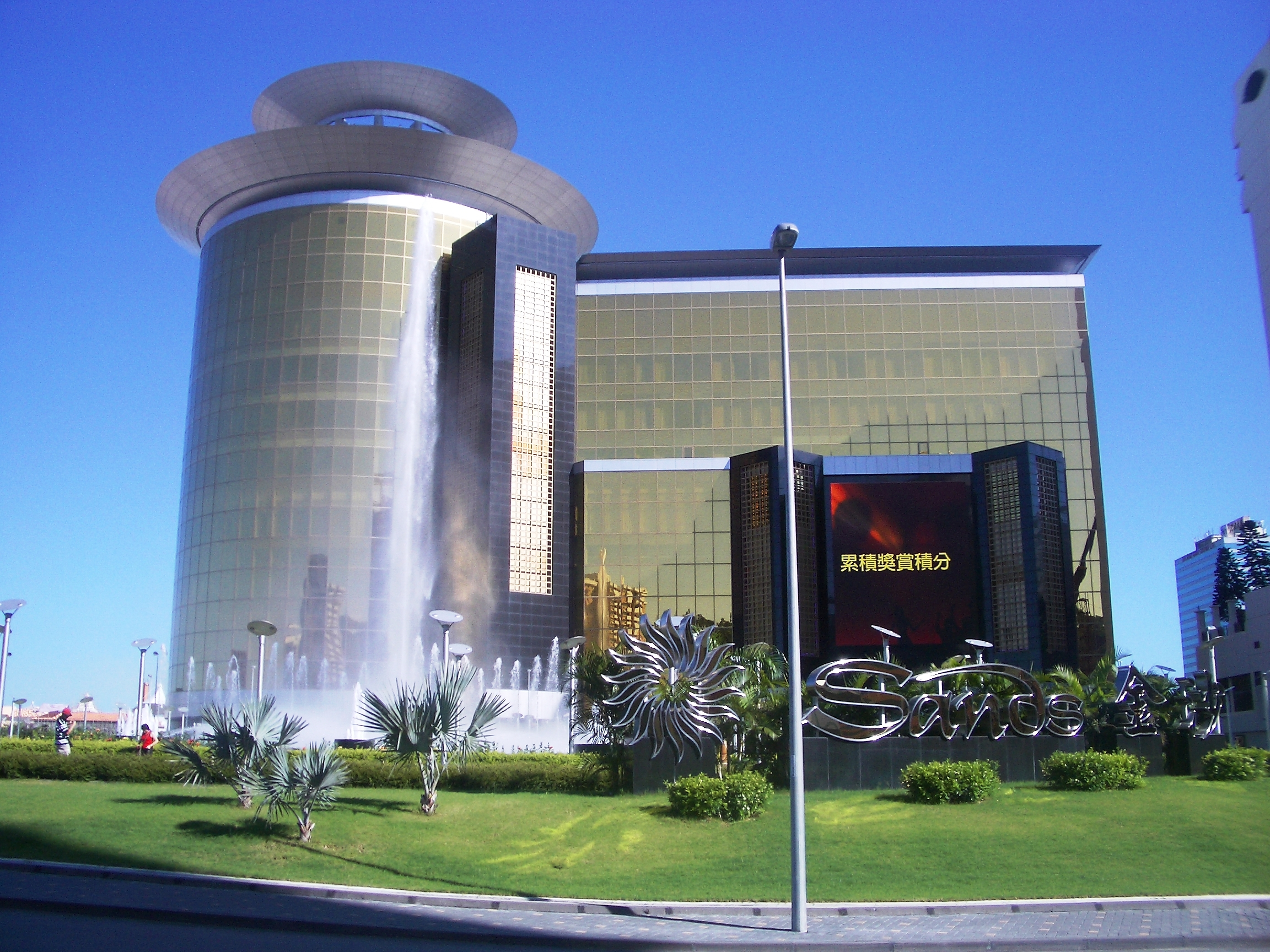
Sands Macao in 2005

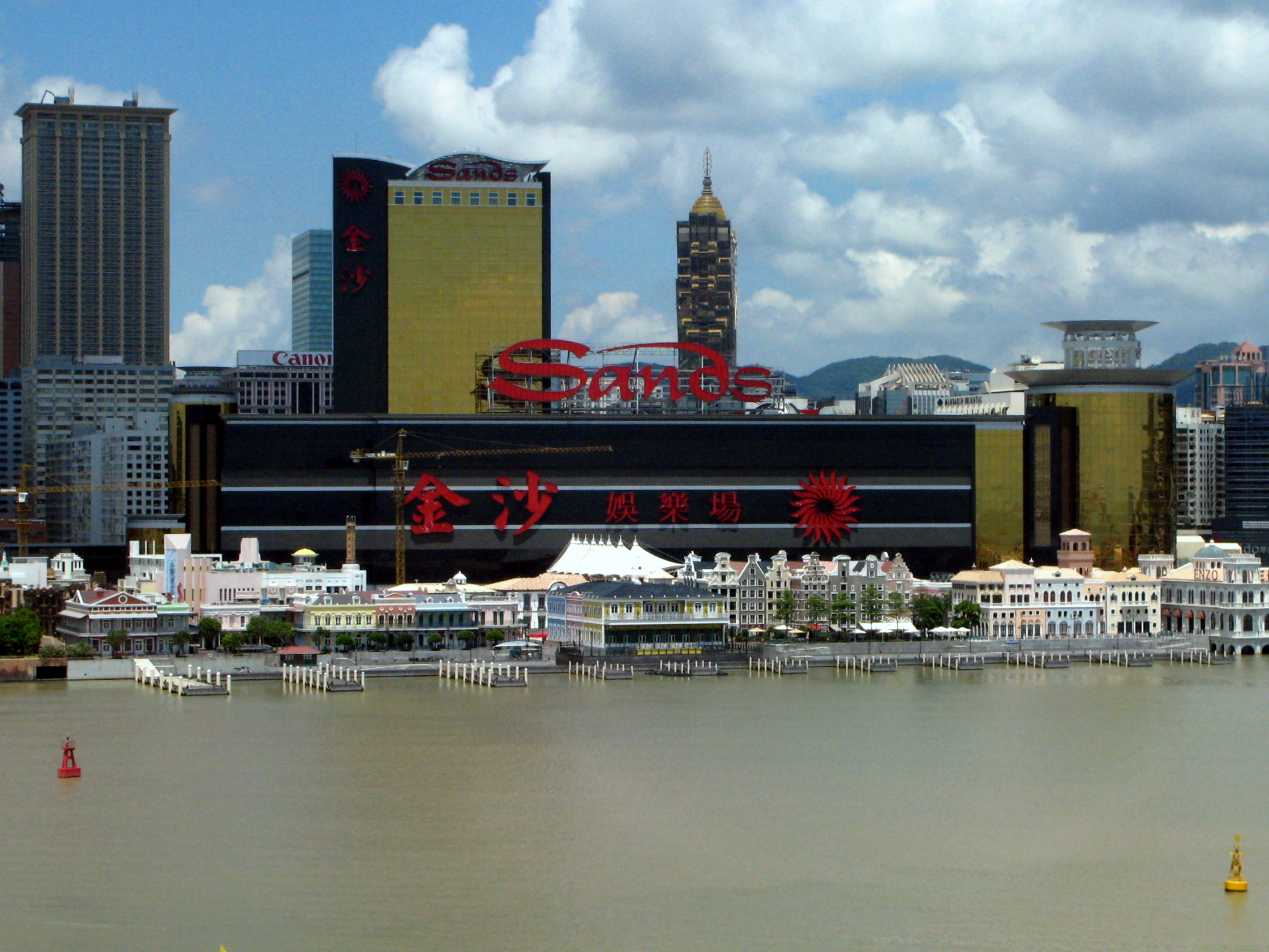
Sands Macao in 2009

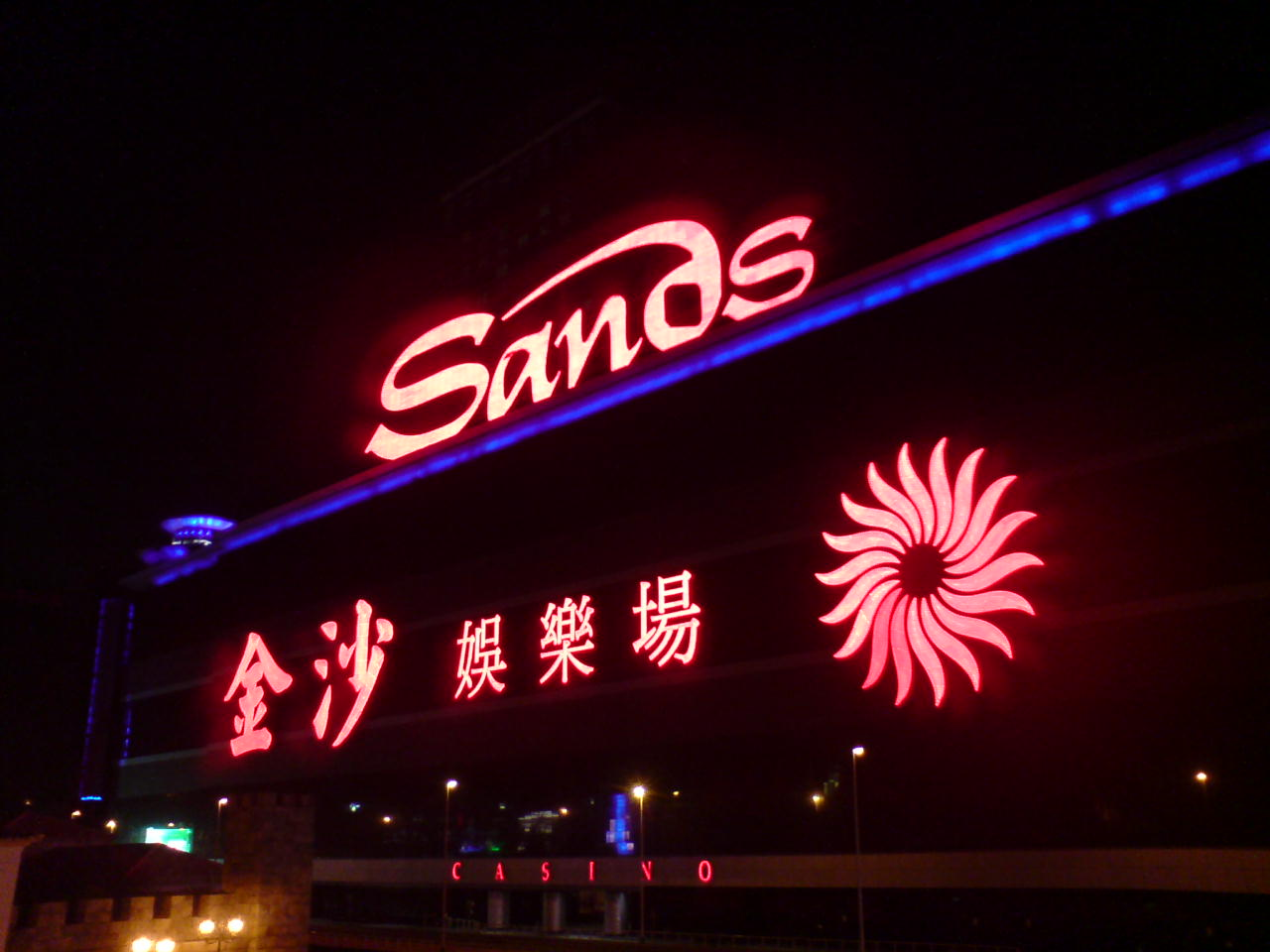
Sands Macao at night

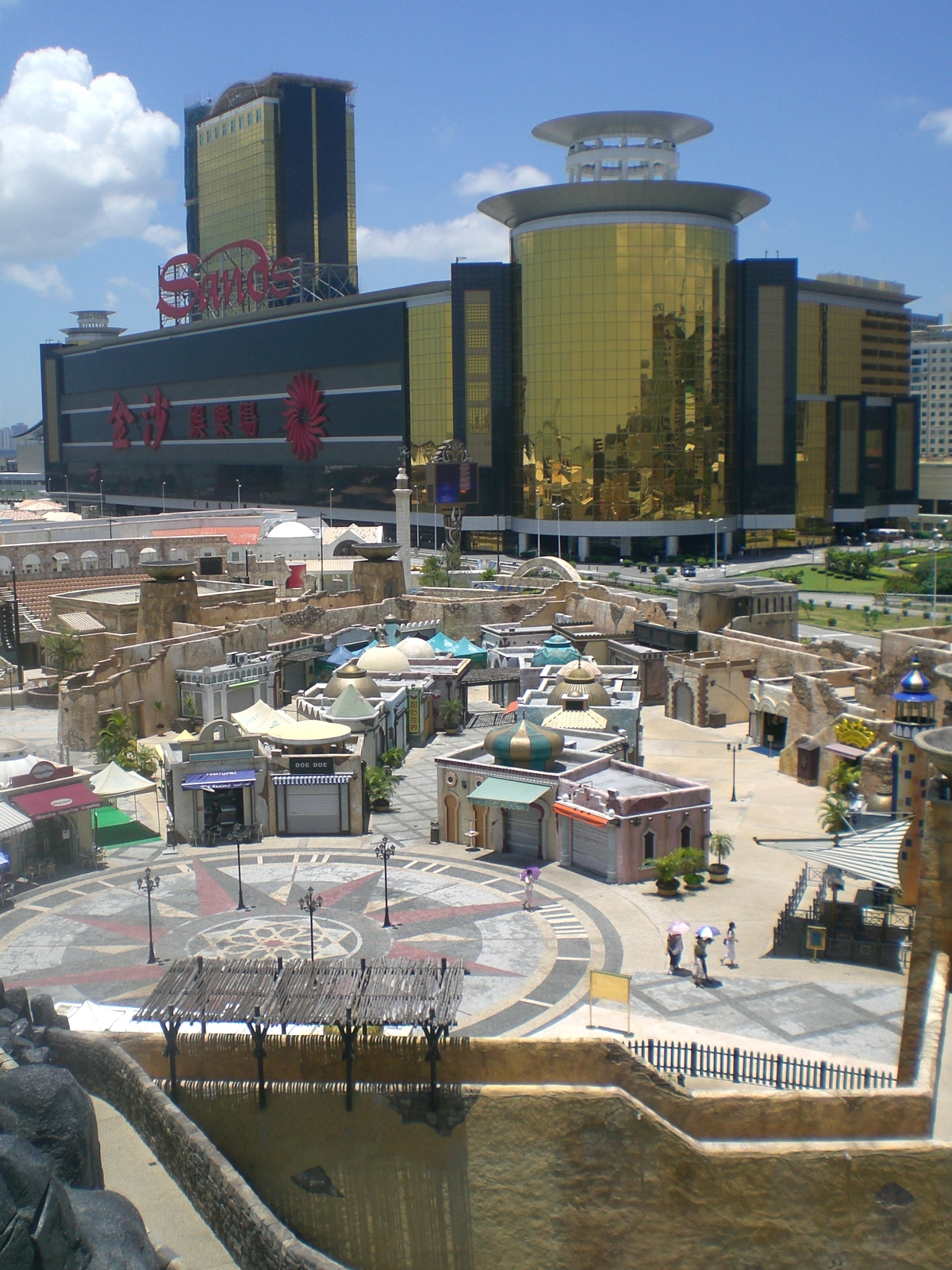
Fisherman’s Wharf

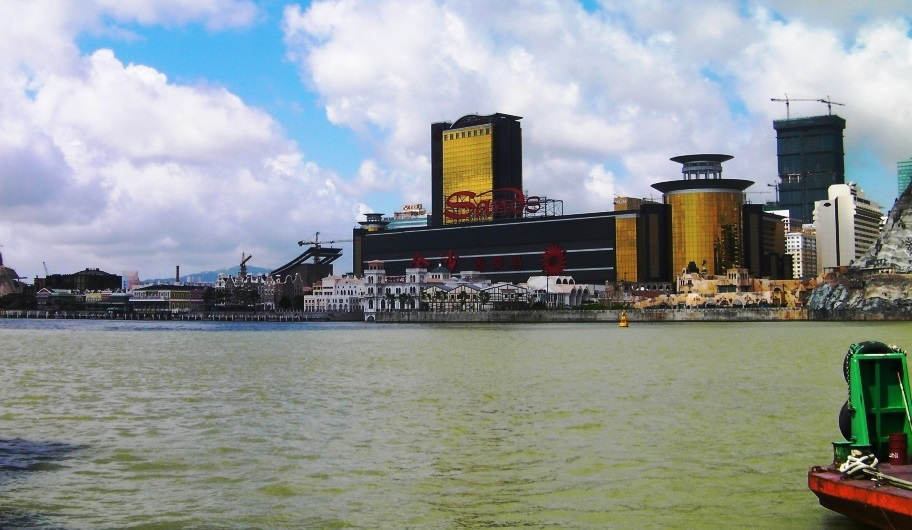
View of resort

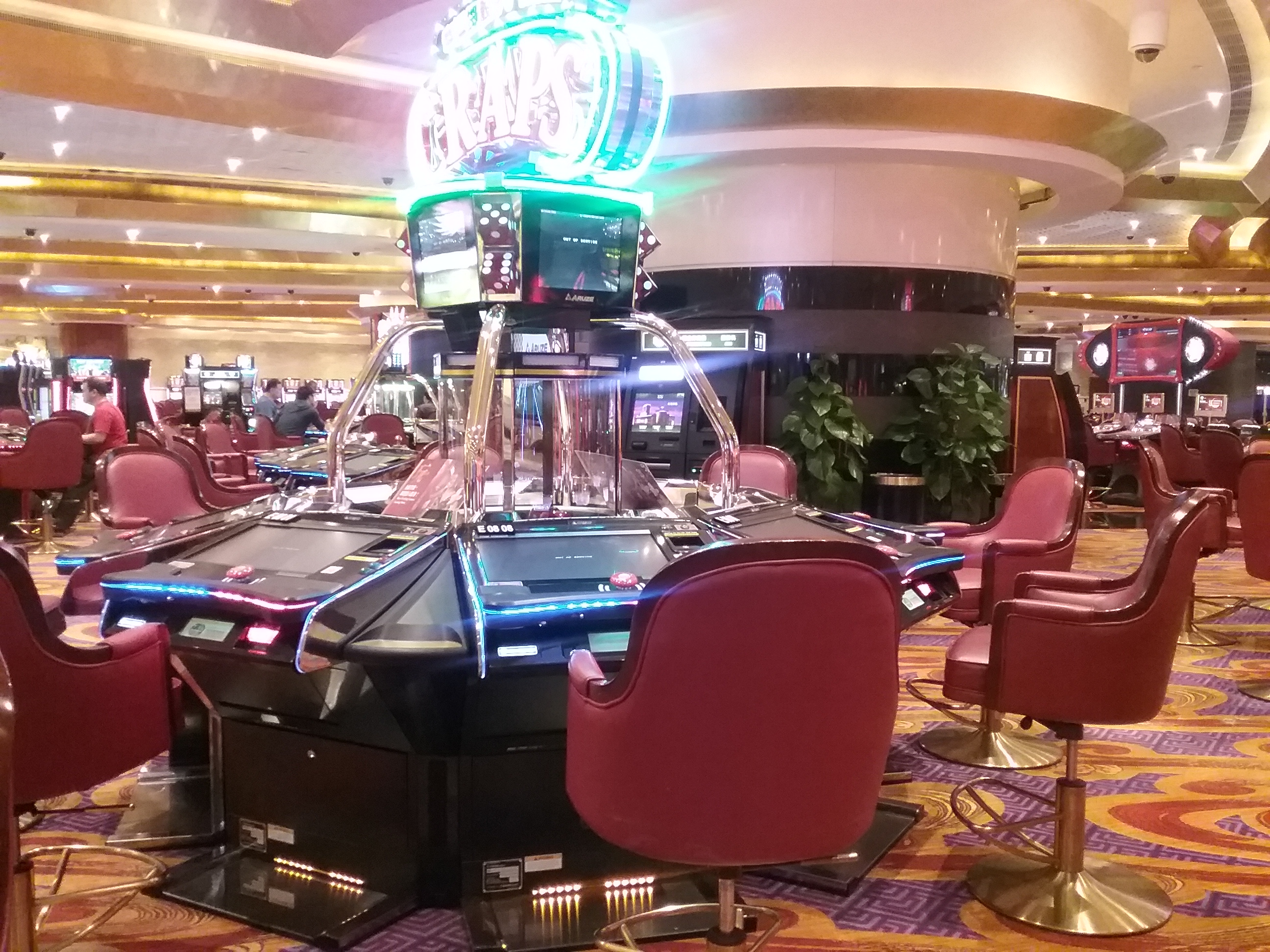
Inside the casino in 2016

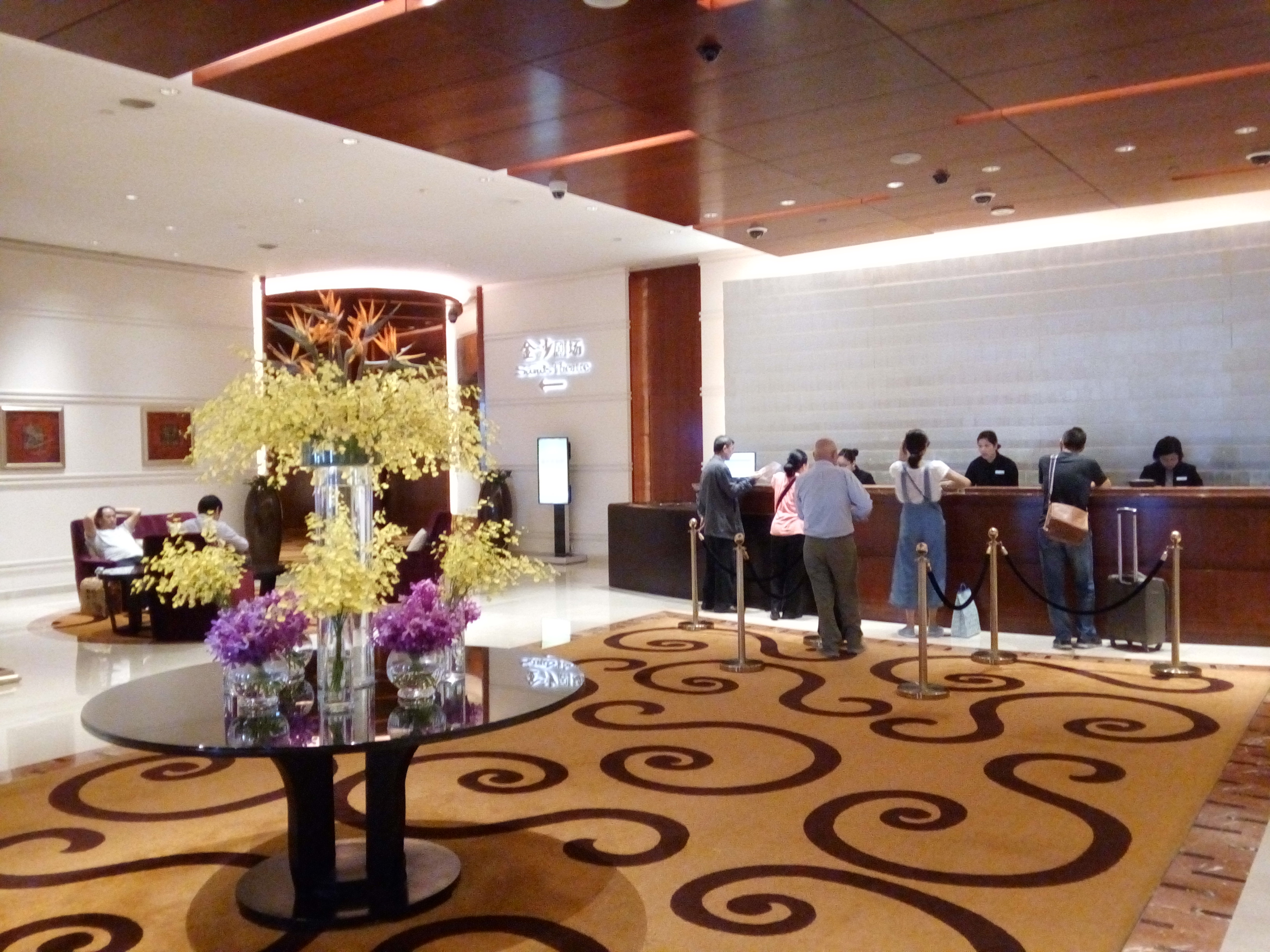
Inside the lobby

== See also ==
- Gambling in Macau
- Sands Hotel and Casino
- List of integrated resorts
