= Port of Macau =

One of two ports in Macau, China

Coordinates: 22°11′47″N 113°42′38″E

Port of Macau 澳門港 Porto de Macau
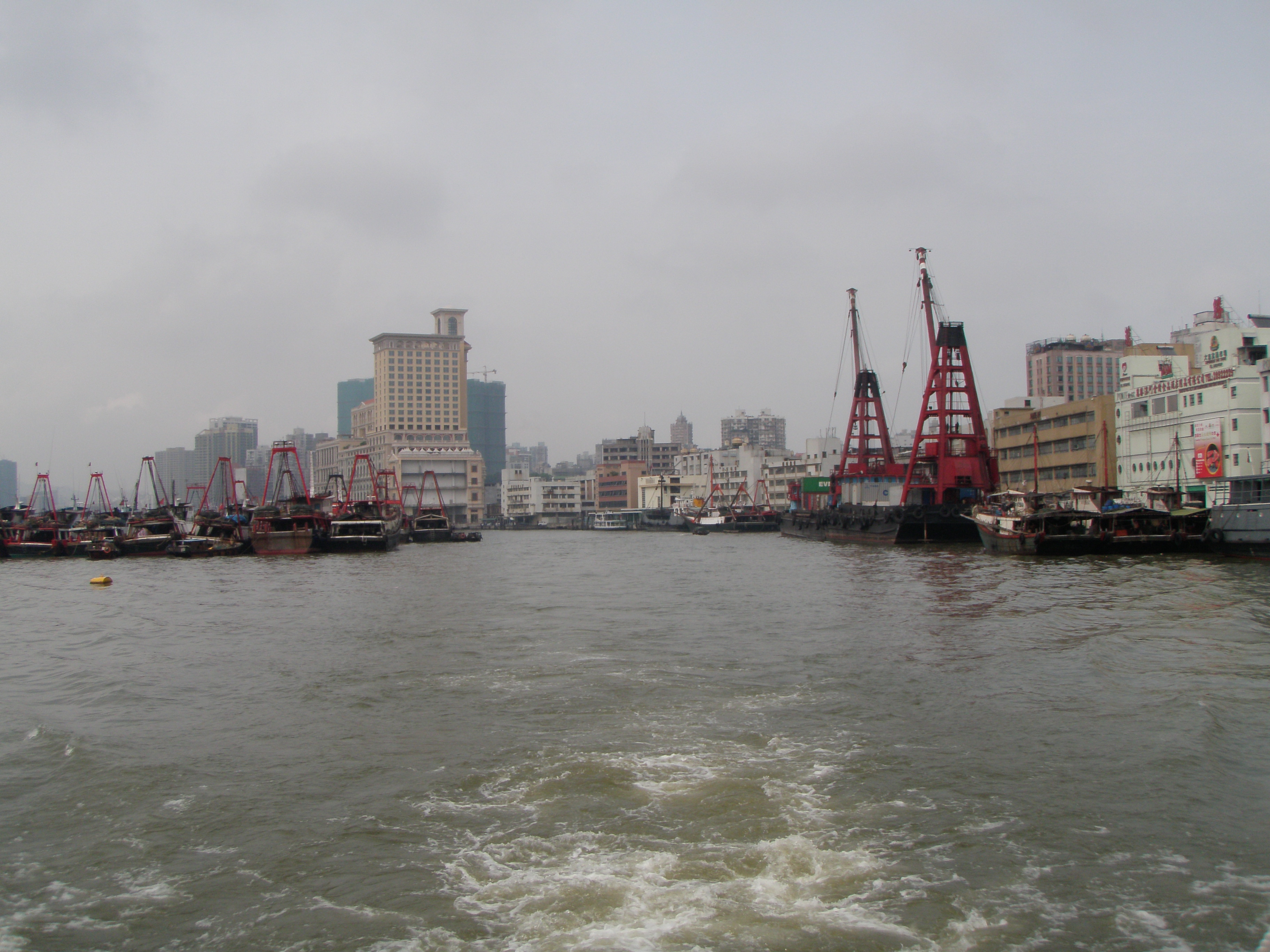

Location
- Country: People's Republic of China
- Location: Macau

Details
- Opened: 1557
- Operated by: Marine and Water Bureau, Macauport Co.
- Owned by: Government of Macau
- Type of harbour: Shallow water Seaport

Statistics
- Website www.macauport.com.mo

The Port of Macau is the seaport of Macau, China.

== Layout ==
The Port of Macau is divided into four areas:

- The Interior Port (內港 - Porto Interior): Fairway is 45-55m wide and 3.5m deep. It includes the Inner Harbor Ferry Terminal
- The Exterior Port (外港 - Porto Exterior): It contains the old Fishing Wharf and the Macau Ferry Terminal. Fairway is 120m wide and 4.5m deep
- The Taipa Ferry Terminal, on Taipa Island, next to the Macau International Airport.
- Kai Ho Port (九澳港 - Porto de Ká-Hó) on the northeast tip of Coloane Island contains the Macau Container Terminal, the Macau Oil Terminal and the docks of the Macao Cement Manufacturing Company and the Macao Electricity Company.

== See also ==
- Transport in Macau
