= Freeway motorcycling restrictions in East Asia =

Freeways in some East Asian countries and areas, namely Mainland China, South Korea and Taiwan have restrictions on motorcycles that are not widely implemented elsewhere around the world, such as access restrictions, limits on carrying passengers, and different speed limits.

== Access and passenger restrictions ==
Countries and areas in and around East Asia impose access restrictions on motorcycles' use of freeways that are not widely applied elsewhere, from prohibiting motorcycles with passengers to prohibiting motorcycles altogether. Certain opponents of these motorcycle restrictions argue that slower surface roads with intersections are probably more dangerous for motorcycles and their passengers than the limited access freeways.

=== Mainland China ===
In Mainland China, two-wheel motorcycles driven on the freeways may not carry passengers. A vehicle must be capable of maintaining a speed of 70 km/h to be driven on the freeways. However, in many Chinese provinces, motorcycles cannot use expressways at all.

Macau has no freeways, while Hong Kong operates under different systems than Mainland China.

=== Japan ===
In Japan, a motorcycle must have an engine displacement of more than 125 cc to be driven on expressways.

A person aged at least 20 who has held a motorcycle driver's license for at least three years may carry a pillion passenger on a two-wheel motorcycle on an expressway. However, some segments of the Shuto Expressway in central Tokyo prohibit pillion passengers on two-wheel motorcycles. Before April 1, 2005, two-wheel motorcycles were not allowed to carry pillion passengers on the expressways, and a motorcycle had to use a sidecar to carry a passenger on the expressways.

=== South Korea ===
Motorcycles are forbidden on all freeways in South Korea. The only exceptions are emergency vehicles such as police motorcycles, army/prisoner convoy units, ambulances, and so on. Additionally, there are some non-freeway roads that motorcycle riding is forbidden.

=== Taiwan ===
In Taiwan, administered by the Republic of China, the governmental agencies in charge of the traffic control of the freeways (高速公路) and expressways (快速公路) are the Ministry of Transportation and Communications (交通部) and the Ministry of the Interior (内政部) pursuant to Article 33 of the Act Governing the Punishment of Violation of Road Traffic Regulations (zh:道路交通管理處罰條例).

Motorcycles, unless used for certain police purposes or emergency tunnel duties, are prohibited from the freeways due to possible safety hazards as officially claimed:

1. Freeways in Taiwan do not have motorcycle lanes. Sharing lanes with cars and large vehicles could be very dangerous.
2. Motorcycles are much less protected than cars, so any accident that might occur would be much worse, especially since frequent interchanges with complex traffic flows increase the dangers to motorcyclists.
3. Taiwanese motorcyclists may not be patient, so should they squeeze between other vehicles, dangers would arise and traffic flow would be disturbed.
4. The freeway traffic volume is over capacity and freeways need better management to relieve traffic. Allowing motorcycles would worsen traffic problems.

Counterarguments by opponents of the above reasons include:

1. Vehicles traveling at the same speed would not collide.
2. As most traffic accidents and crashes occur in intersections, surface roads tend to be even more dangerous for motorcycles despite common slower speeds.
3. Proper safety education for all should reduce most safety issues.
4. Solo car drivers switching to riding motorcycles should reduce traffic congestion.

Article 19 of the Freeway and Expressway Traffic Control Regulation (zh:高速公路及快速公路交通管制規則), effective on 1 July 2006, makes it officially possible to allow motorcycles with a cylinder capacity of more than 550 cc on certain expressways. On 29 June 2012 article 20 of the same was amended to permit the use of motorcycles over 250cc (i.e. yellow and red registration plates) on most expressways, as well as permitting the use of motorcycles over 550cc on freeways. Due to negative reactions from car drivers, police and local governments, the amendment permitting red-plate motorcycles on freeways has not been implemented on schedule

When the Legislative Yuan amended Article 92 of the Act Governing the Punishment of Violation of Road traffic Regulations on 12 January 2007 and the Executive Yuan ordered on 13 September 2007 to validate that amendment on Thursday, 1 November 2007, a motorcycle with a cylinder capacity of at least 550 cc may be driven on most expressways. While motorcycles are still banned from freeways, the Legislative Yuan has asked the Ministry of Transportation and Communications in 2007 to study the feasibility to allow powerful motorcycles on freeways by 2010.

A further amendment on 8 November 2011 theoretically permits motorcycles over 550cc (i.e. those with red registration plates) to drive on freeways under certain conditions.

== Speed restrictions ==
Due to perceived safety concerns, freeways in certain countries and areas impose lower speed limits upon motorcycles than cars:

- Mainland China: 80 km/h (as opposed to 120 km/h for cars)
- Japan: The same speed limits for passenger cars apply for motorcycles. The maximum posted speed in Japan is 120 km/h and statutory speed limit for motorcycles defaults to 100 km/h on divided national expressways unless otherwise posted. Prior to 2000, motorcycles were limited to 80 km/h.

== See also ==
- Non-motorized access on freeways
- Regulation of Motorcycle access on Freeways
