= Taxis of Macau =

Taxicabs of Macau are a key part of public transport in Macau. There are approximately 700 cabs registered in Macau.

== History ==
Due to concerns with the lack of sufficient taxis available, it was reported in 2023 that 500 taxis were being made available over the next eight years.

== Types ==
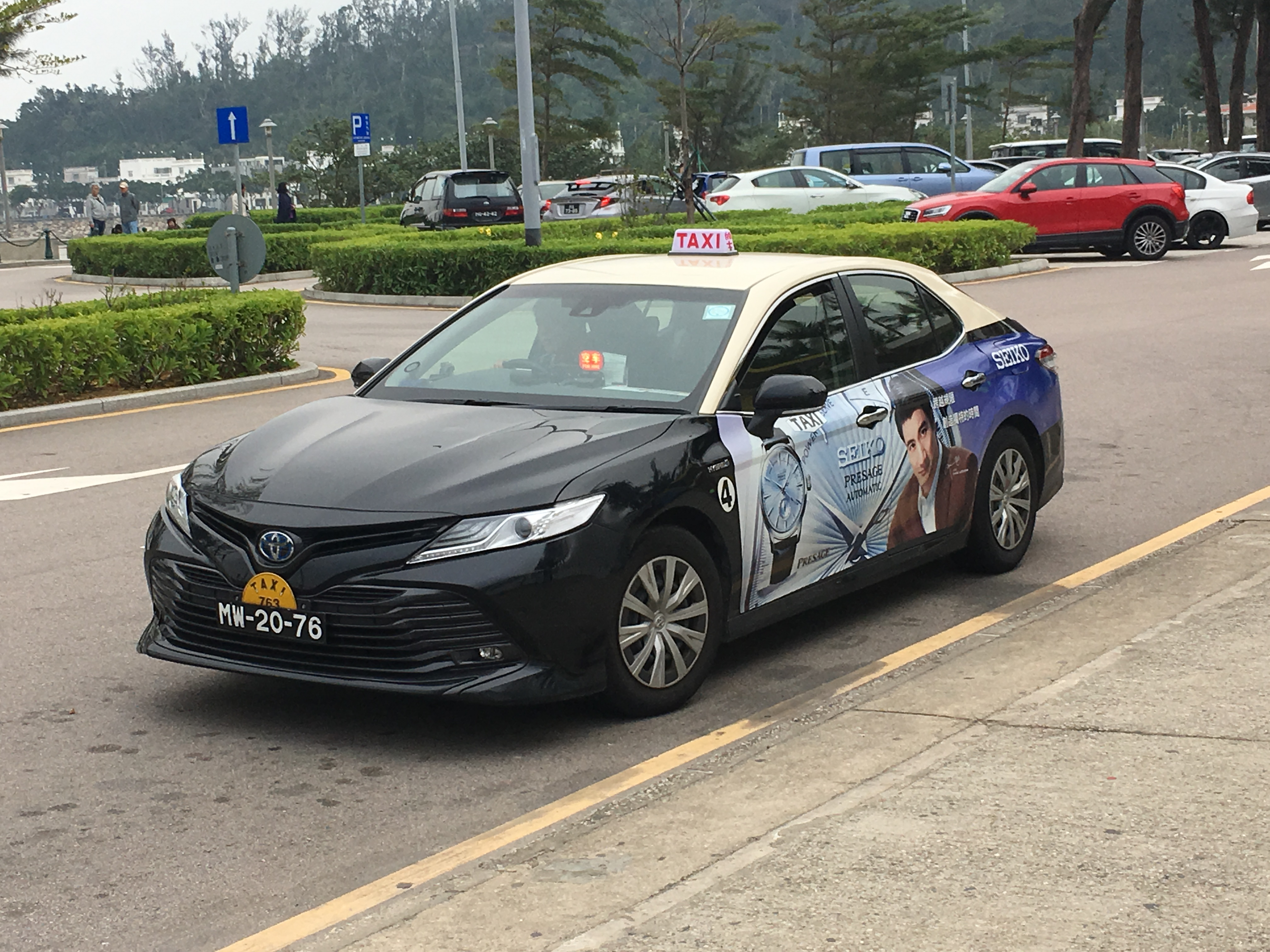
Black Cab Macau Taxi.

There are two types of taxicabs in Macau, easily recognizable by their color patterns. They are:

- Black Cab, probably the oldest in Macau and judged by some to be the most comfortable.
- Macau Radio Taxi Service, founded in 2015, focuses on immediate and advanced Taxi reservation through call center, mobile application and official website.

== Known companies ==
=== Defunct ===
- Yellow Cab, founded in 1989, was known for drivers who drive faster than their counterparts in the black cabs. The government sent an ultimatum in 2014 to operator Vang Iek Radio Taxi to change their service to dial hire format or cease legal operation on November 6.

== Fuel used ==
About 85% of all taxis in Macau run on LPG, while the remaining 15% run on diesel
