= Miss Macao =

Hong Kong commercial seaplane; hijacked by pirates in 1948

Coordinates: 22.182°N 113.744°E

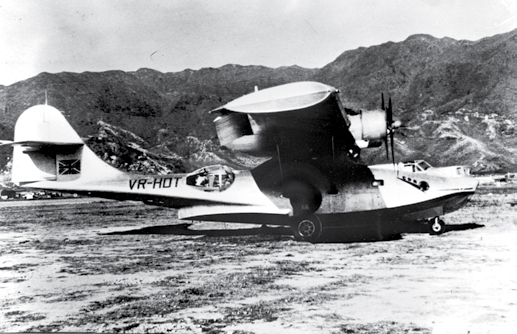
- VR-HDT, the aircraft involved. Seen in 1940

Hijacking
- Date: 16 July 1948
- Summary: Hijacking resulting in crash, robbery
- Site: Jiuzhou Yang (Pearl River Delta) just northeast of Green Island, Xiangzhou, Zhuhai

Aircraft
- Aircraft type: Consolidated PBY-5A Catalina
- Operator: Macau Air Transport Company (Cathay Pacific)
- Registration: VR-HDT
- Flight origin: Macau
- Destination: Hong Kong
- Passengers: 23
- Crew: 3
- Fatalities: 25
- Injuries: 1
- Survivors: 1 (lead hijacker)

Miss Macao
- Traditional Chinese: 澳門小姐
- Simplified Chinese: 澳门小姐
Transcriptions
Standard Mandarin
- Hanyu Pinyin: Àomén xiǎojie
- Wade–Giles: Ao-men Hsiao-chieh
Yue: Cantonese
- Jyutping: ou3 mun4*2 siu2 ze2
- Sidney Lau: O^{3} Moon^{4} Siu^{2} Je^{2}

Miss Macao (Chinese: 澳門小姐; Sidney Lau: O^{3} Moon^{4} Siu^{2} Je^{2}) was a Catalina seaplane owned by Cathay Pacific and operated by subsidiary Macau Air Transport Company. On 16 July 1948 it was involved in the first hijacking of a commercial aircraft. Piracy for robbery and ransom was the motive. The aircraft crashed after the pilot was shot while resisting the attackers; 25 people died, including three hijackers, but one hijacker survived by jumping out of the airplane before impact.

The lone survivor, Wong Yu (黃裕; 黄裕; Wong^{4} Yue^{6}; Huáng Yù), confessed to membership of the gang of four pirates who attempted the hijacking (then simply labelled "piracy"). The hijackers met with fierce resistance, in which the copilot, the captain and some of the passengers fought back, wounding many of the hijackers, during which the captain was shot, causing the aircraft to nosedive into the sea, but Wong Yu survived by jumping out the emergency exit just before the plane hit the water. The objective of the plot was to rob wealthy passengers and hold them for ransom. He was brought to court by the Macau police, but the Macau court suggested that the prosecution should be brought in Hong Kong instead, since the plane was registered in Hong Kong and most of the passengers were from there. However, the British colonial government in Hong Kong stated that the incident happened over Chinese territory in which the British had no jurisdiction. Since no state claimed authority to try him, Wong was released without trial from Macao Central Prison on 11 June 1951, and was then deported to China.

Wong Yu, 27 years old, died a short time after his deportation. Mark Footer of the South China Morning Post wrote that "rumour had it" that Wong Yu was killed by officials in China, as they wanted to act against people who had committed aviation hijackings, and that the death was made to appear accidental. A male businessperson from China told Roy Farrell, a co-founder of Cathay Pacific, that Wong Yu died due to the effects of a typhoon near the prison, just after his release; Gavin Young, author of Beyond Lion Rock: The Story of Cathay Pacific Airways, described the businessperson as "well-informed".

== Occupants ==
The nationalities of pilot Dale Cramer, first officer Ken McDuff, and flight attendant Delca da Costa were American, Australian, and Portuguese, respectively. The flight attendant originated from Macau, and she and McDuff were in a romantic relationship.

== See also ==
- 1933 Imperial Airways Diksmuide crash, the first act of in-flight airline sabotage
- List of aviation accidents and incidents with a sole survivor
