= Outer Harbour Ferry Terminal =

Coordinates: 22°11′49.47″N 113°33′32.08″E

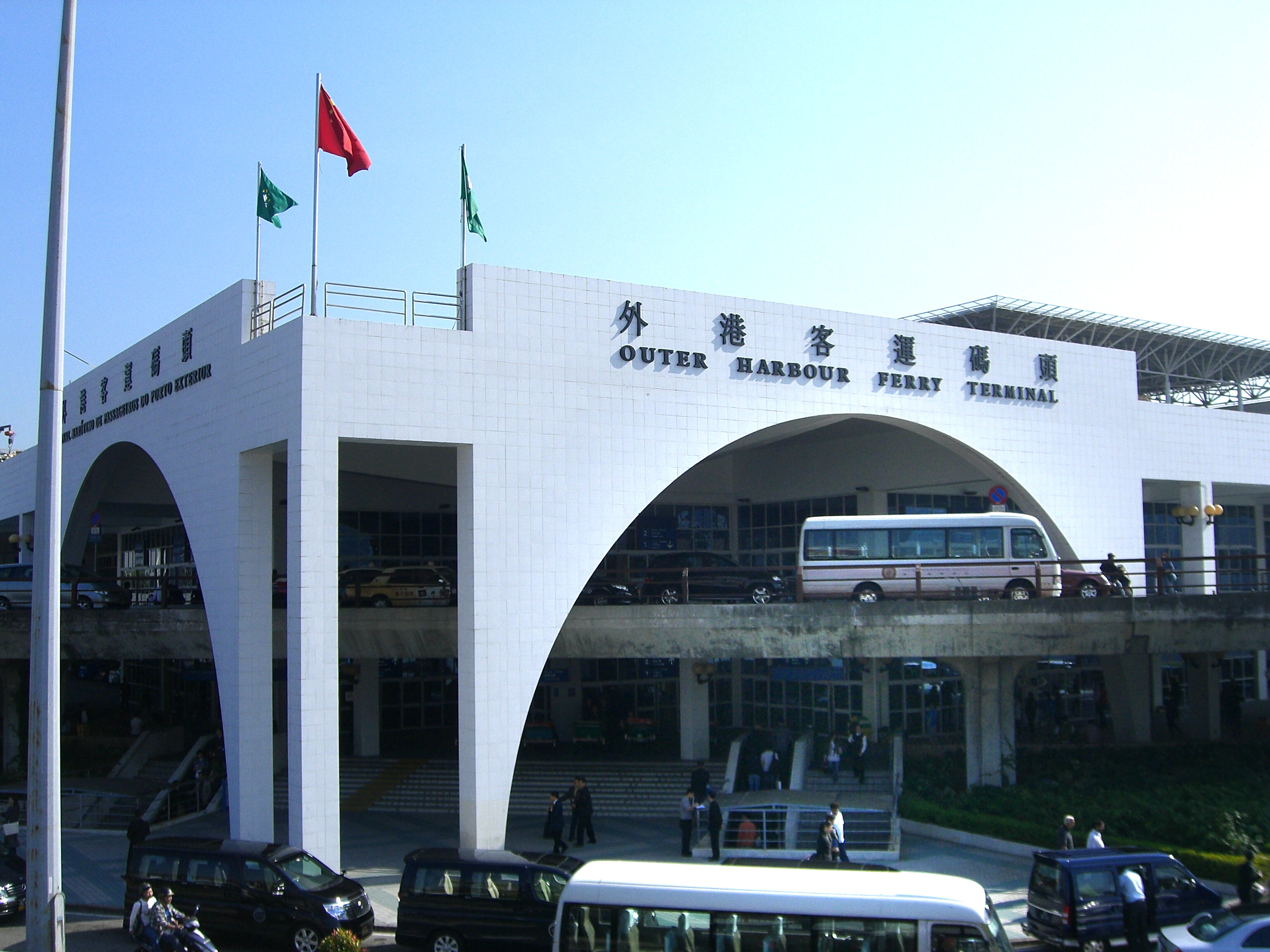
- The pier building in November 2009

Chinese name
- Traditional Chinese: 外港客運碼頭
- Simplified Chinese: 外港客运码头
- Literal meaning: Outer Harbour Passenger Pier
Transcriptions
Standard Mandarin
- Hanyu Pinyin: Wài Gǎng Kèyùn Mǎtóu
Yue: Cantonese
- Jyutping: ngoi6 gong2 haak3 wan6 maa5 tau4

Alternative Chinese name
- Traditional Chinese: 港澳碼頭
- Simplified Chinese: 港澳码头
- Literal meaning: Hong Kong-Macau Pier
Transcriptions
Standard Mandarin
- Hanyu Pinyin: Gǎng Ào Mǎtóu
Yue: Cantonese
- Jyutping: gong2 ou3 maa5 tau4

Portuguese name
- Portuguese: Terminal Marítimo de Passageiros do Porto Exterior

The Outer Harbour Ferry Terminal (IATA: XZM) (Portuguese: Terminal Marítimo de Passageiros do Porto Exterior; traditional Chinese: 外港客運碼頭; simplified Chinese: 外港客运码头), also known as the Macau Maritime Ferry Terminal, Macau Ferry Terminal or Hong Kong-Macau Ferry Pier in Chinese (traditional Chinese: 港澳碼頭; simplified Chinese: 港澳码头), is a ferry terminal located at Porto Exterior, Sé, Macau, China.

== History ==
The pier was formerly located near present-day Oceanus Casino, ex-New Yaohan Store on Avenida da Amizade. In 1993, the terminal was relocated to its present location. A new terminal was completed in 2017 for the convenience of travellers of Macau International Airport near Taipa.

From 1948 to 1961, Macau Air Transport Company operated seaplane service to Hong Kong from the terminal.

== Facilities ==
It provides ferry services to Hong Kong. The terminal provides 12 berths for hydrofoils and 2 for ferries. The pier features a heliport, providing an alternative to TurboJET. The terminal building is a two-storey structure with arrivals on the lower level and departures on the upper level. On the outside is a helipad and 6 boat docks (facing the east side). The Macau tourism office is located in the lower level. The duty-free shop is located on the upper level.

=== Helipad ===
Macau Ferry Heliport
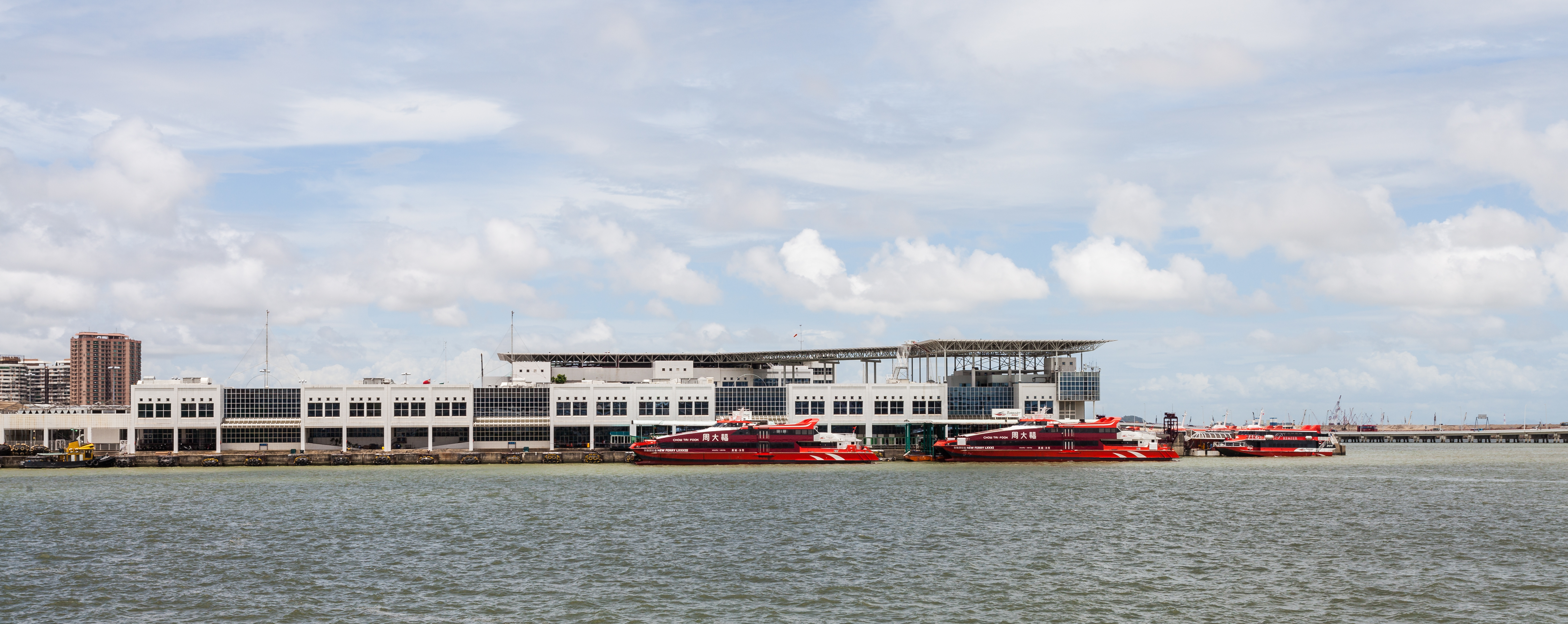
- Macau Ferry Heliport in August 2013
- IATA: XZM; ICAO: VMMH

Summary
- Airport type: Public
- Operator: Sky Shuttle
- Location: Macau
- Interactive map of Macau Ferry Heliport

The helipad was added in 1995 with 2 pads and expanded to 5 in 2001. The passenger lounge was upgraded in 2004. There are proposals for 3 more pads to the north of the current site. There are flights to Hong Kong and Shenzhen.

== Operators ==
Operators from the terminal include:

- TurboJET operates a ferry service between Macau and Hong Kong Island at the Hong Kong-Macau Ferry Pier in Macau and the Shun Tak Centre in Hong Kong Central. Ferries take approximately 1 hour in the high-speed vessels. In 2011, Turbojet bought out ferry rival New World First Ferry, operating a ferry service between Macau and Kowloon, Hong Kong (China Ferry Terminal in Tsim Sha Tsui).
- Cotai Jet operates a daily route between this pier and Hong Kong–Macau Ferry Pier, Hong Kong located at Shun Tak Centre.
- Chu Kong Passenger Transport (CKS) operates ferries from Macau to various mainland cities in China, mostly to Shekou Cruise Center in Shekou and Shenzhen Fuyong Ferry Terminal (serving Shenzhen Bao'an International Airport) in Shenzhen.
- Sky Shuttle Helicopters (formerly Heli-Express) operates regular helicopter service between the Hong Kong-Macau Ferry Pier in Macau, the Shun Tak Centre in Hong Kong and Shenzhen Bao'an International Airport. There are around 56 flights daily. Flights take approximately 16 minutes in the 12 passenger seat aircraft. The heliport IATA code is XZM. It has no ICAO code. There are 10 to 12 flights operating between Macau and Shenzhen Bao'an Airport depending on the day of the week.

== Ground Transportation ==
Outside the terminal are bus and taxi platforms at Terminal Maritimo and Jai Alai for connections all over Macau.

Taxis are also another means of transport from the ferry terminal to other parts of Macau.

== See also ==
- Transportation in Macau
- Transmac
- Transportas Companhia de Macau
