= Non-motorized access on freeways =

Use of freeways by pedestrians or by non-motorized vehicles

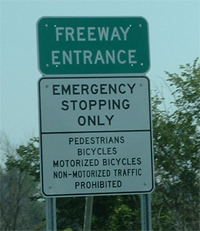
Freeway entrance sign effectively banning everyone not traveling by motor vehicle with enough power.

Non-motorized access on freeways may allow or restrict pedestrians, bicyclists and other non-motorized traffic to use a freeway. Such roads are public ways intended primarily for high-speed travel over long distances, and they have resulted in highways in the United States with engineering features such as long sight-distances, wide marked lanes and the absence of cross traffic. These provide faster and safer travel, at least for vehicles driving at similar speeds.

Freeways are usually limited to motor vehicles of a minimum power or speed; signs may prohibit bicyclists, pedestrians and equestrians and impose a minimum speed. It is possible for non-motorized traffic to use facilities within the same right-of-way, such as sidewalks constructed along freeway-standard bridges and multi-use paths next to freeways such as the Suncoast Trail along the Suncoast Parkway in Florida.

== European Union ==
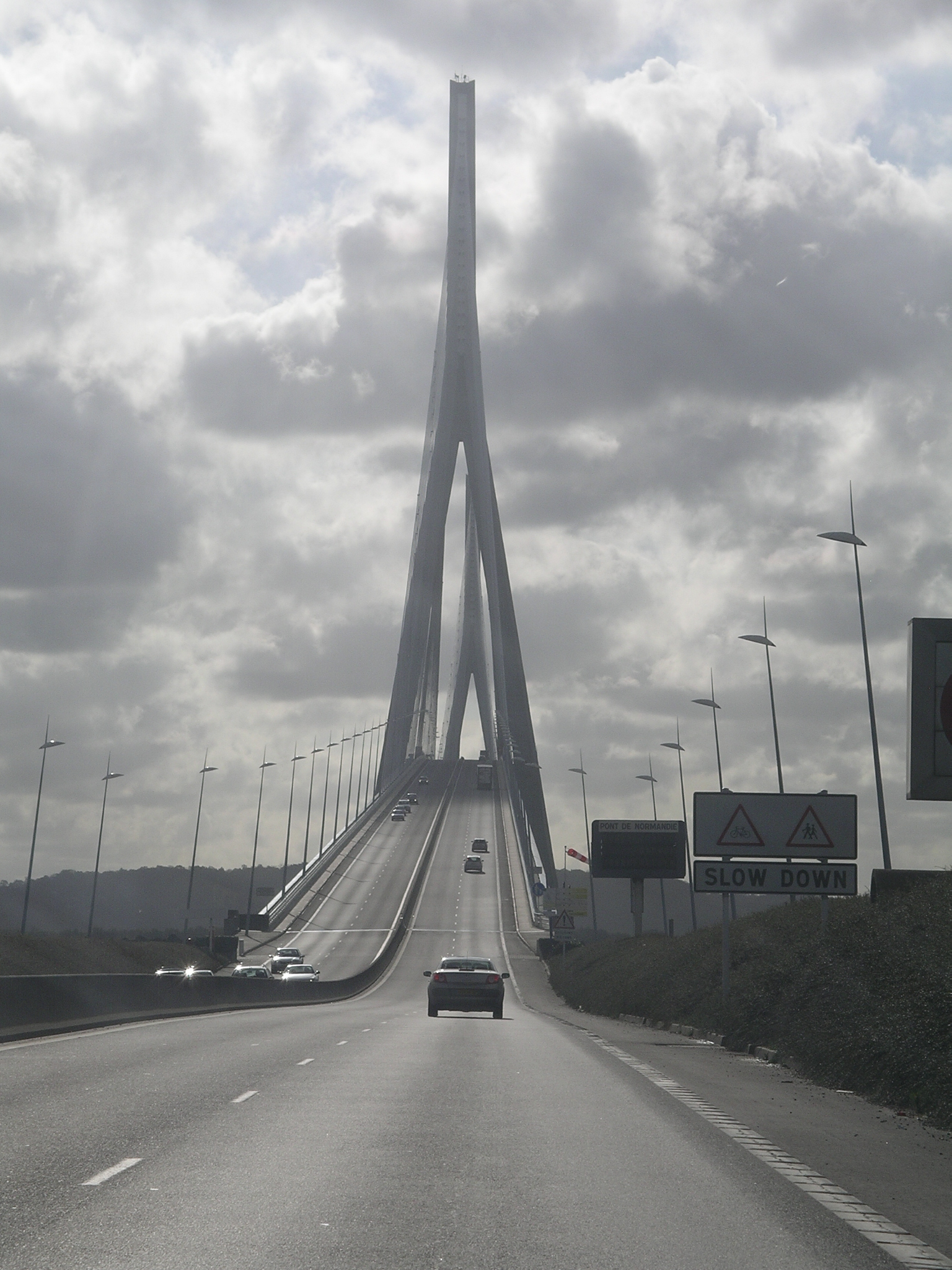
Despite the autoroutes of France normally banning non-motorized traffic, a warning sign cautions motorists as an exception on the Pont de Normandie.

In the countries of Western and Northern Europe with relatively high bicycle share like the Netherlands, Denmark, Belgium and Germany, cycling on motorways is not a topic for debate: cycling is not allowed on official motorways, and is generally forbidden with road signs on all similar roads.

In those countries it has no practical use, and effort is put in building an independent cycling network, crossing no entrance and exit ramps of arterial roads and expressways. Some sections of the cycle networks of these countries are adjacent to (but separated from) a motorway, but those are exceptions.

== United Kingdom ==
In countries such as the United Kingdom and Germany, the difference between a normal road and a freeway-class road (motorway or autobahn) is the restriction of low-speed traffic. Many roads are built to freeway standards but are not legally freeway-class roads for this reason. Indeed, some freeway-class roads are downgraded for short stretches where no alternative exists, to allow low-speed traffic; examples in the UK include the Dartford Crossing (Note: Non-motorized traffic may not use the Dartford Crossing, however cyclists are shuttled across the crossing for free by car. Low speed motorized traffic is allowed.) (the furthest downstream public crossing of the Thames), and the former Cumberland Gap, as well as sections of the A1 not yet designated A1(M), various lengths of the A5, and the entirety of other important and near-motorway-standard links such as the A14, A34, A38, A42, A50, and A55 road, long stretches of which carry 70 miles per hour (110 km/h) speed limits. The reasons for such designation vary—physical lack of space (A55), restricted budget (e.g. A42; a full-standard motorway would have been more expensive than an A-road; a motorway with additional service roads further still), or because of legislative or political wrangling (easier to have A-road construction or upgrade authorised and accepted than a more emotionally charged "motorway scheme", and does not require issuing of Special Road orders).

In Scotland, it's common for new expressway routes to be built as "non-motorway Special Road". These do have Special Road orders, but then require further legislation to stop them being motorways, to set speed limits, etc. Non-motorway Special Roads are most easily identified with a standard set of prohibition signs at every entry, and with 70mph speed limits explicitly signed instead of National Speed Limit.

== United States ==
In some US jurisdictions, especially where freeways replace existing roads, non-motorized access on freeways is the rule. Different states of the United States have different laws. Cycling on freeways in Arizona may be prohibited only where there is an alternative route judged equal or better for cycling. Wyoming, the least populated state, allows cycling on all freeways. Oregon allows bicycles except on specific urban freeways in Portland and Medford.

Freeway travel eliminates most collision points that are caused by turning or crossing at intersections, save at entrance and exit ramps. An analysis of crashes in Arizona showed no safety problems with cycling on freeways. Fewer than one motor vehicle-bicycle crash a year was recorded in the 1990s on nearly 2,000 shoulder miles (3,200 km) open to cyclists in Arizona. The study did not attempt to establish how common cyclists are on Arizona freeways or whether they are aware that they can legally cycle on some freeway stretches; accidents were also noted on stretches where cycling was forbidden.

=== U.S. states permitting bicycle use on interstate highways ===
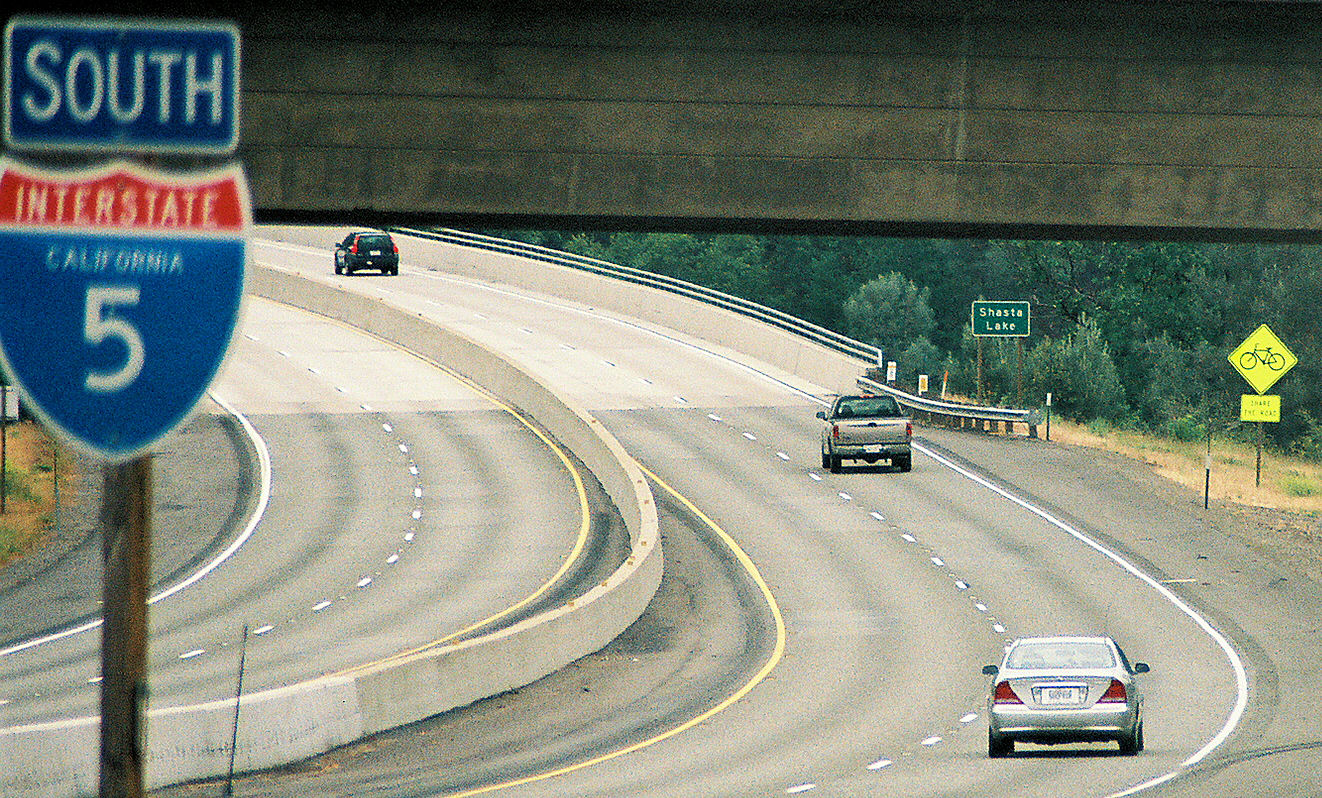
A warning sign advising motorists to share the road with bicyclists on I-5 in California.

Most U.S. States with low population densities commonly permit bicycle use on interstate freeways outside urban areas. Additionally, some states permit bicycle use on at least some interstate routes specially designated to accommodate bikes.

State	Regulation
Alabama	Prohibited (possible exceptions)
Alaska	Allowed if no suitable alternative
Arizona	Allowed if no suitable alternative
Arkansas	Prohibited (possible exceptions)
California	Allowed if no suitable alternative
Colorado	Allowed if no suitable alternative
Connecticut	Prohibited (possible exceptions)
Delaware	Prohibited (possible exceptions)
District of Columbia	Discouraged, but not prohibited
Florida	Prohibited (possible exceptions)
Georgia	Prohibited (possible exceptions)
Hawaii	Prohibited (possible exceptions)
Idaho	Allowed on all interstates
Illinois	Prohibited (possible exceptions)
Indiana	Prohibited (possible exceptions)
Iowa	Prohibited (possible exceptions)
Kansas	Prohibited (possible exceptions)
Kentucky	Prohibited (possible exceptions)
Louisiana	Prohibited (possible exceptions)
Maine	Prohibited (possible exceptions)
Maryland	Prohibited (possible exceptions)
Massachusetts	Prohibited (possible exceptions)
Michigan	Prohibited (possible exceptions)
Minnesota	Prohibited (possible exceptions)
Mississippi	Prohibited (possible exceptions)
Missouri	Discouraged, but not prohibited
Montana	Allowed on all interstates
Nebraska	Prohibited (possible exceptions)
Nevada	Allowed if no suitable alternative
New Hampshire	Prohibited (possible exceptions)
New Jersey	Allowed with permit
New Mexico	Allowed if no suitable alternative
New York	Prohibited (possible exceptions)
North Carolina	Prohibited (possible exceptions)
North Dakota	Allowed on all interstates
Ohio	Prohibited (possible exceptions)
Oklahoma	Discouraged, but not prohibited
Oregon	Allowed unless prohibited
Pennsylvania	Allowed if no suitable alternative
Rhode Island	Prohibited (possible exceptions)
South Carolina	Prohibited (possible exceptions)
South Dakota	Allowed on all interstates
Tennessee	Prohibited (possible exceptions)
Texas	Discouraged, but not prohibited
Utah	Allowed if no suitable alternative
Vermont	Prohibited (possible exceptions)
Virginia	Prohibited (possible exceptions)
Washington	Allowed unless prohibited
West Virginia	Prohibited (possible exceptions)
Wisconsin	Prohibited (possible exceptions)
Wyoming	Allowed on all interstates

== Bike freeways ==
Bike freeways (also known as cycling highways) are direct, long-distance cycle tracks separated from motorized traffic and with almost no big intersections or delays, intended for utility cycling. In countries like the Netherlands and Belgium (Flanders), they are built connecting city and town centers, e.g. adjacent to railroads.

== See also ==
- Cycling infrastructure
- Restrictions on motorcycle use on freeways
