= Transport in Macau =

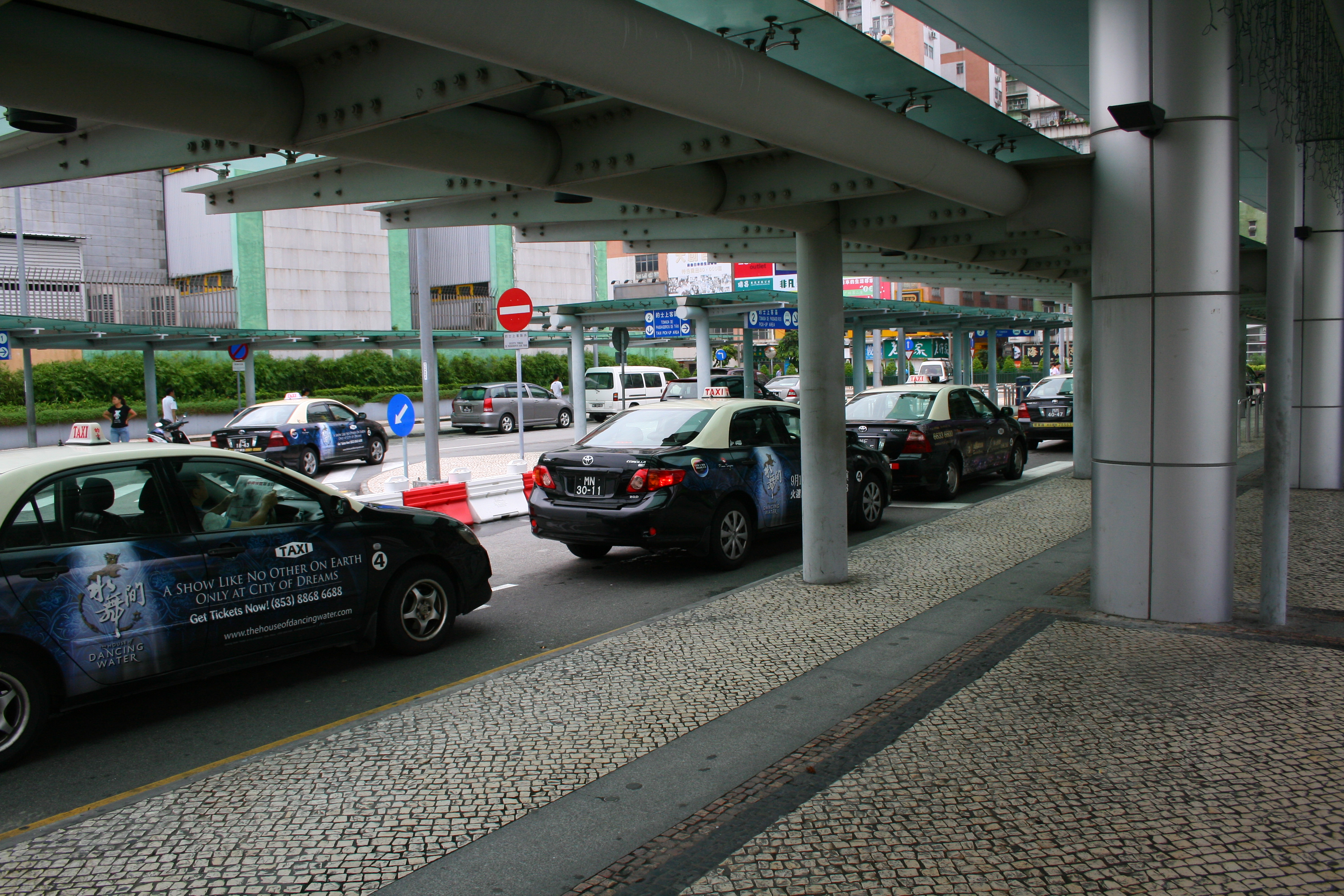
Taxi of Macau

Transport in Macau includes road, sea, rail and air transport. Road transport is the primary mode of transport within Macau, although a new rail system opened in December 2019 serving the areas of Taipa and Cotai. The main forms of public transport are buses and taxis.

Modes of transport out of Macau include ferries to Hong Kong and mainland China from two ferry terminals, as well as helicopter service to Hong Kong. International flights are available from Macau International Airport.

== Internal ==
=== Road ===
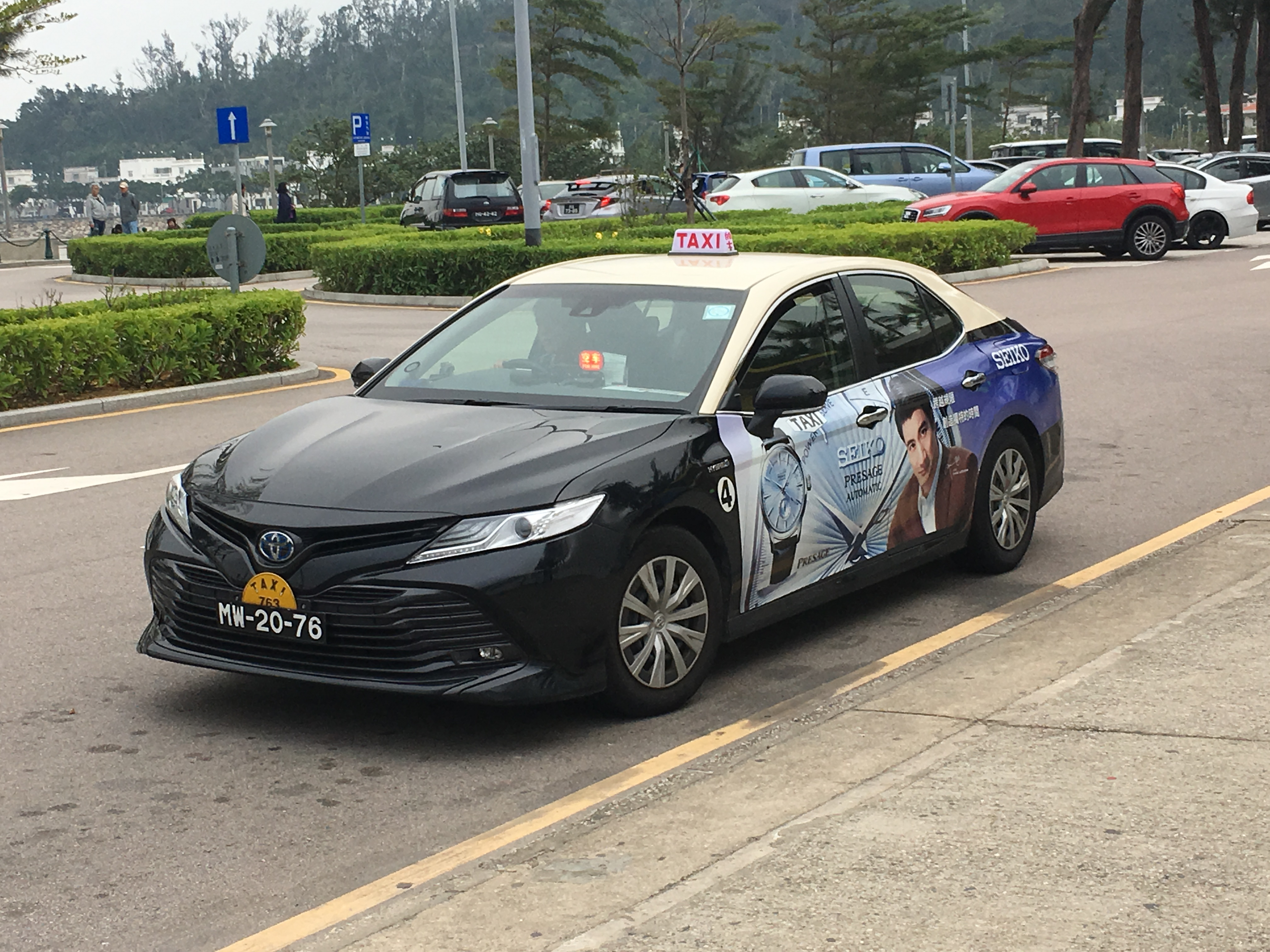
Taxi in Macau.

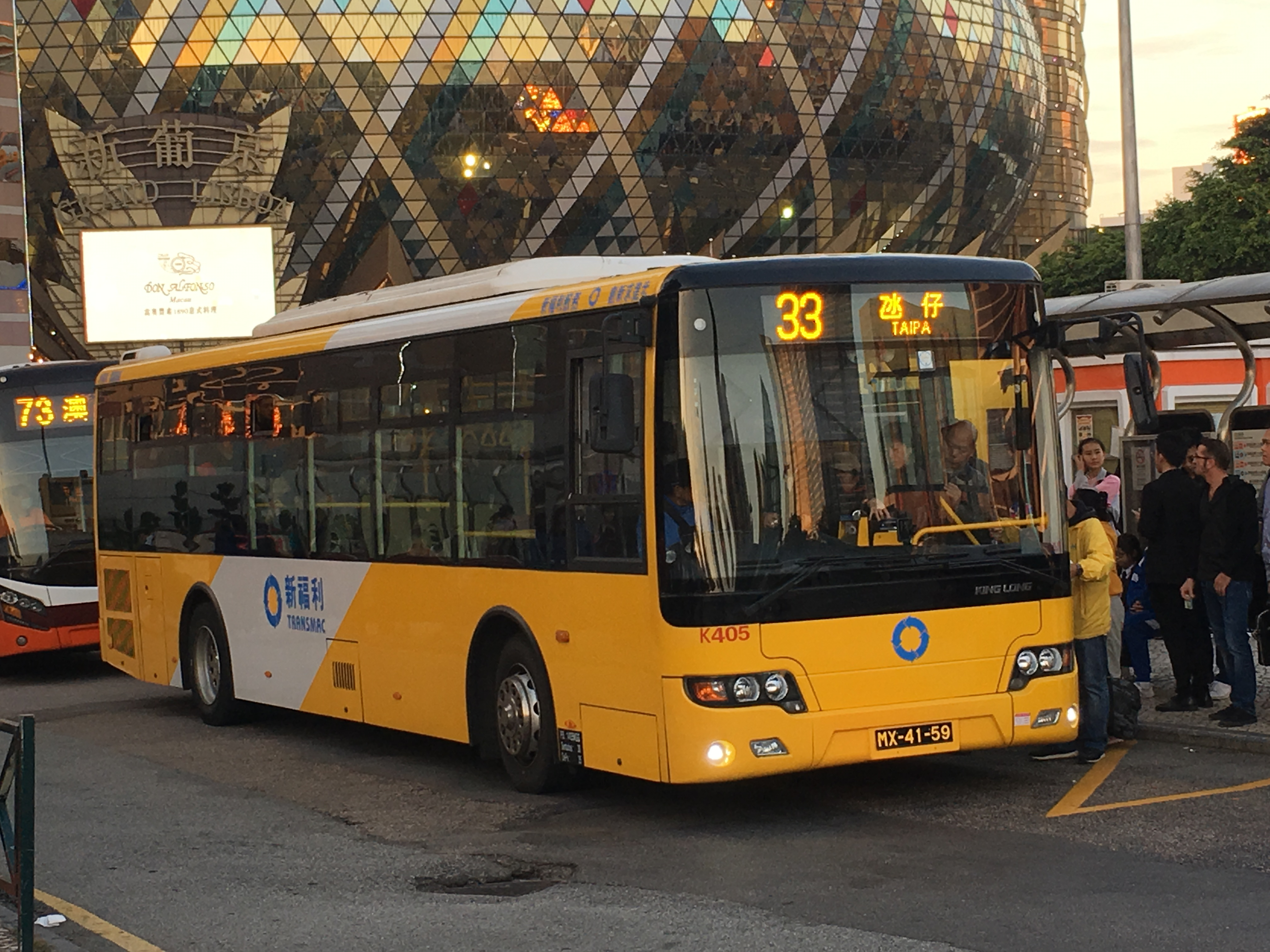
Bus in Macau.

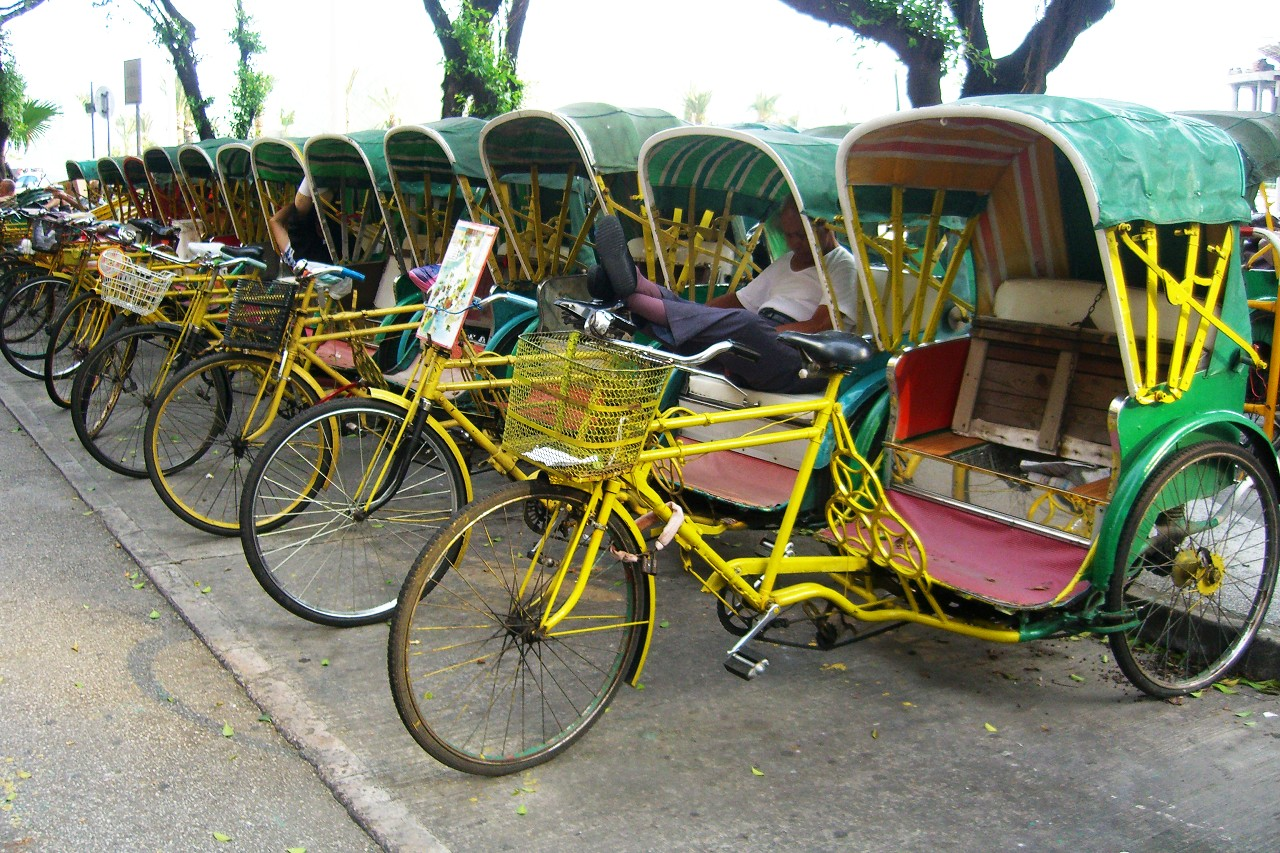
Rickshaw in Macau.

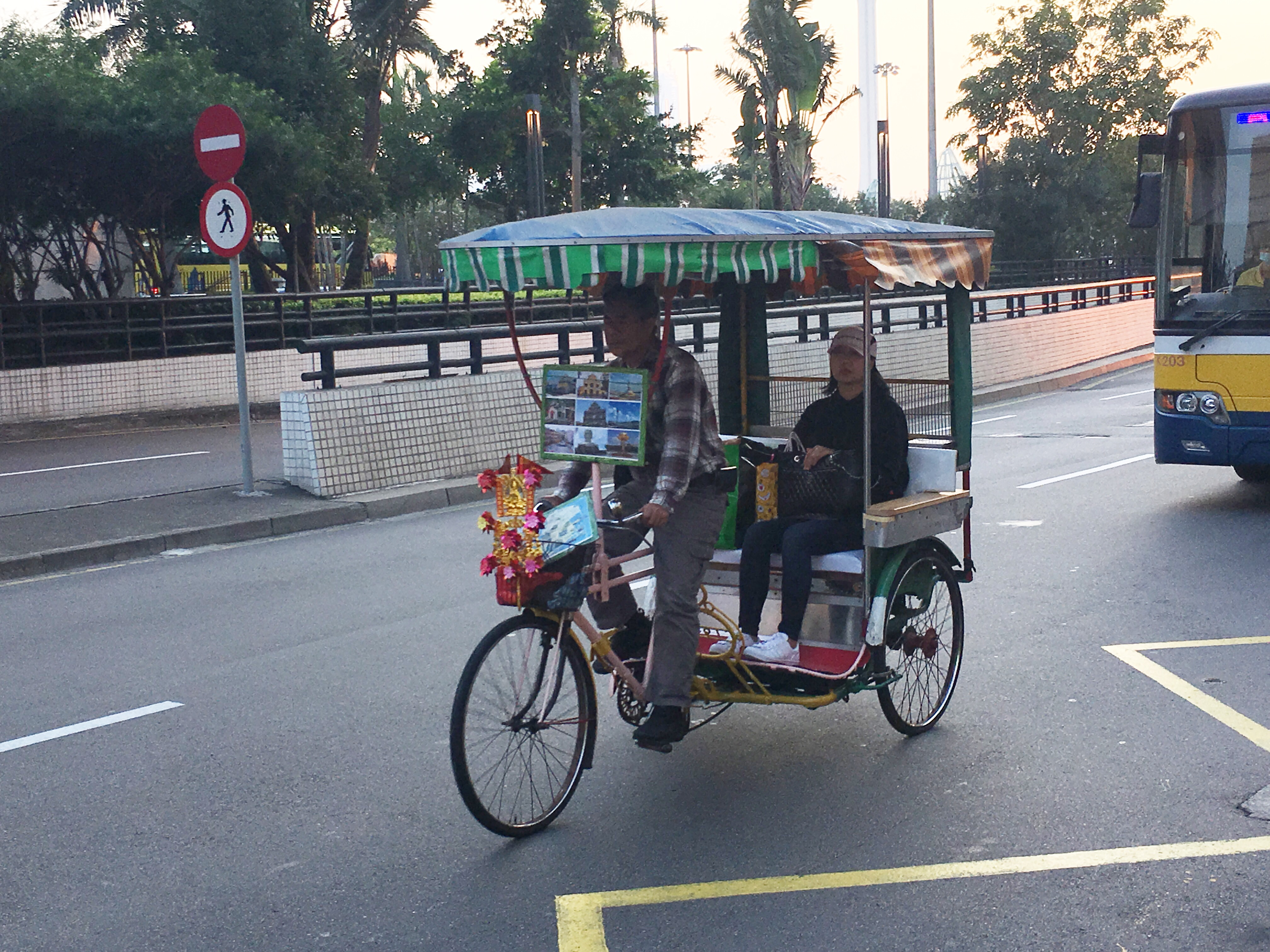
Rickshaw in Macau.

Buses and taxis are the major modes of public transport in Macau. Bus services are frequent and inexpensive, linking the Macau peninsula, Taipa, Cotai and Coloane. Transmac and TCM are the only operators of Macau's bus services. Nova Era (zh), which took over the operations of Reolian, merged with TCM on 1 August, 2018. Most hotels (four-starred or above) and gaming venues operate their own fleet of shuttle bus service between the Hong Kong-Macau Ferry Terminal, Taipa Ferry Terminal or Portas do Cerco (Macau's border to mainland China) and their premises.

Taxis are plentiful near the airport/Taipa ferry terminal, the Hong Kong-Macau and Taipa ferry terminal, and major gaming venues/hotels in the city though it is harder to get one during rush hours on the streets. Most of Macau's taxis have a black body with cream color top livery. Radio taxis are available for the black cabs.

In order to enhance the quality of taxi services, such as eliminate the language barrier between taxi drivers and passengers, the Tourist Office has provided most taxis with a destination guide which includes the names of the most requested destinations in Chinese, Portuguese and English.

The trishaw, a hybrid of the tricycle and the rickshaw, is a unique mode of transport in Macau, though it is mainly for sightseeing purposes but they were a type of mainly used transportation system before the 1970s because of their cheap price. They can easily be found next to Hotel Lisboa and the Macau ferry terminal waiting for passengers.

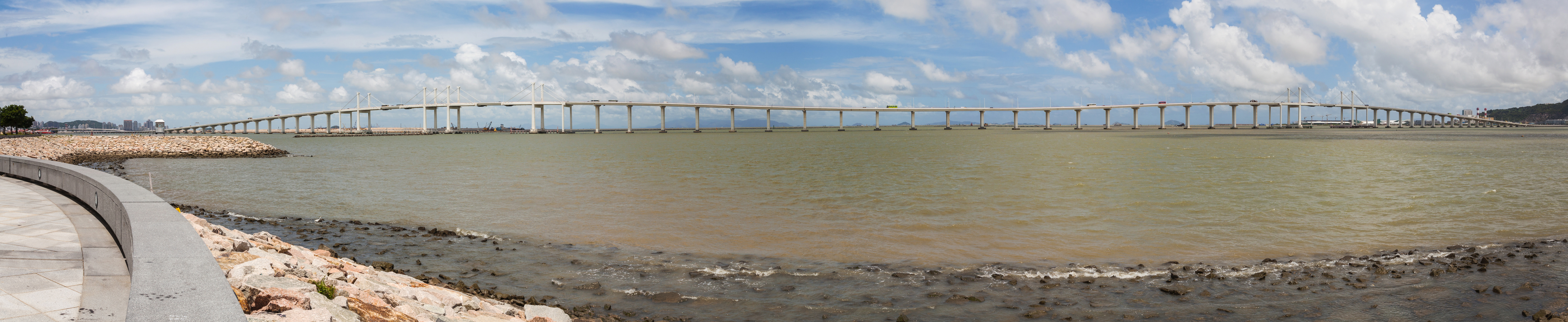
Panoramic view of the 4.7 km long Ponte de Amizade (Friendship Bridge) from the Macau Peninsula (left) to the Taipa Island (right), Macau

=== Railways ===
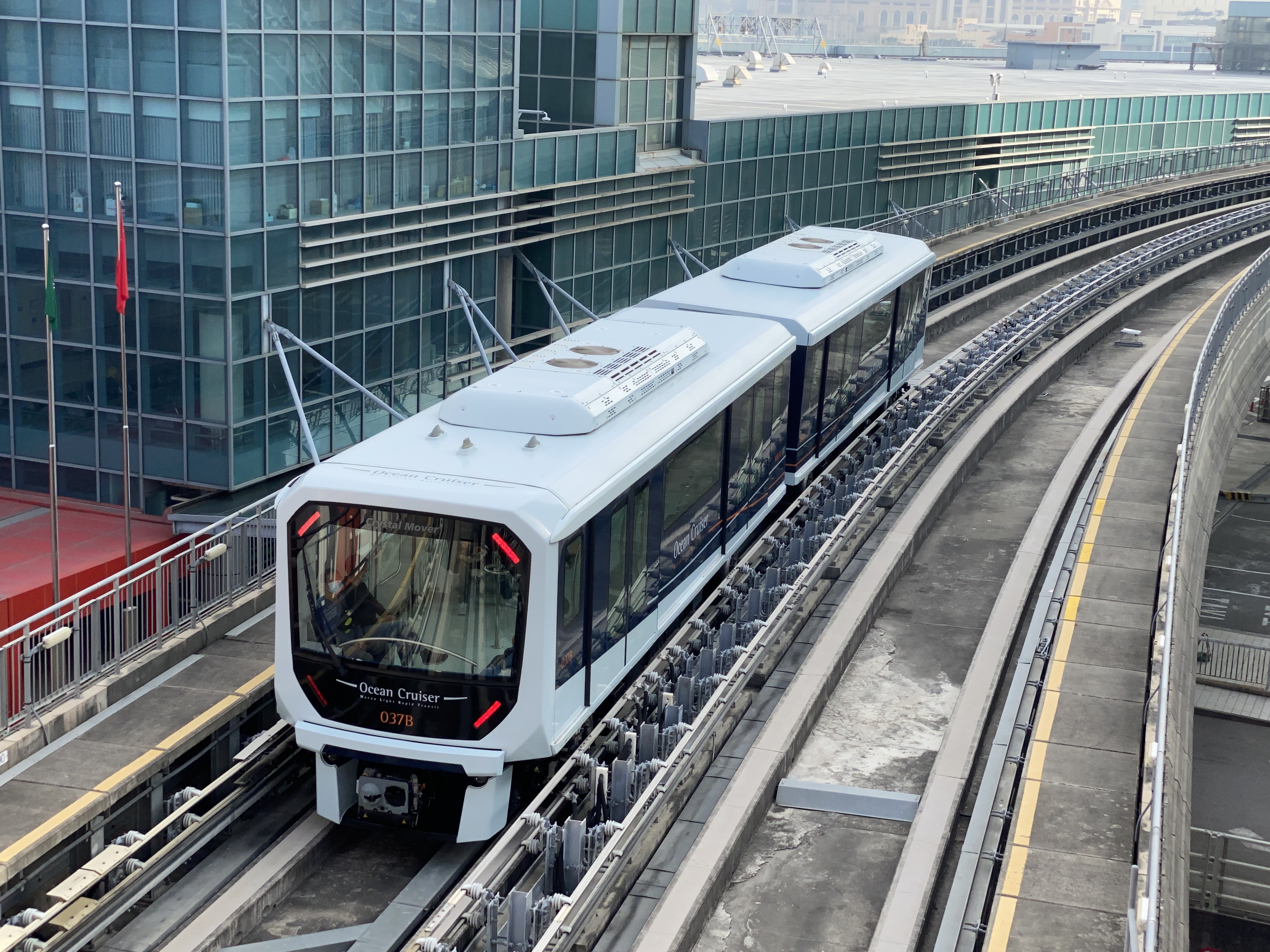
Macau Light Rapid Transit Taipa Line

There is one railway line open in Macau called the Macau Light Rail Transit system. Phase 1 of the Taipa line opened for operations in December 2019. Similar to the Singapore Light Rapid Transit system, the tracks will be a mix of elevated guideways and tunnels, ensuring a dedicated right-of-way separated from road traffic. When completed it will serve passengers on Macau Peninsula, Taipa island, the Cotai reclamation area, the Macau International Airport and the Hong Kong–Zhuhai–Macau Bridge.

Proposals have been put forward to link Macau to the Chinese railway network by extending the Guangzhou Railway (or, possibly, Guangzhou-Zhuhai Intercity Mass Rapid Transit) to Cotai through Hengqin island. However, no decisions have yet been made so far.

Zhuhai Railway Station of the Guangzhou–Zhuhai Intercity Railway terminates adjacent to the northern border entrance into Macau at Portas do Cerco.

Other systems include the Teleférico da Guia gondola lift system on Guia Hill, and the Elevador Inclinado da Colina da Taipa Grande, an inclined lift.

=== Others ===
The Macau Maritime Museum used to have two sailing vessels (which were based on the ancient "junk" form but were remodeled) serving for touring trips between the inner and outer harbours. Along the trip, the crew would introduce the general lifestyle and customs of the local boat dwellers. However, due to the land reclamation works in the harbour and the maintenance of the boats, all trips have been suspended.

== External ==
=== Sea ===
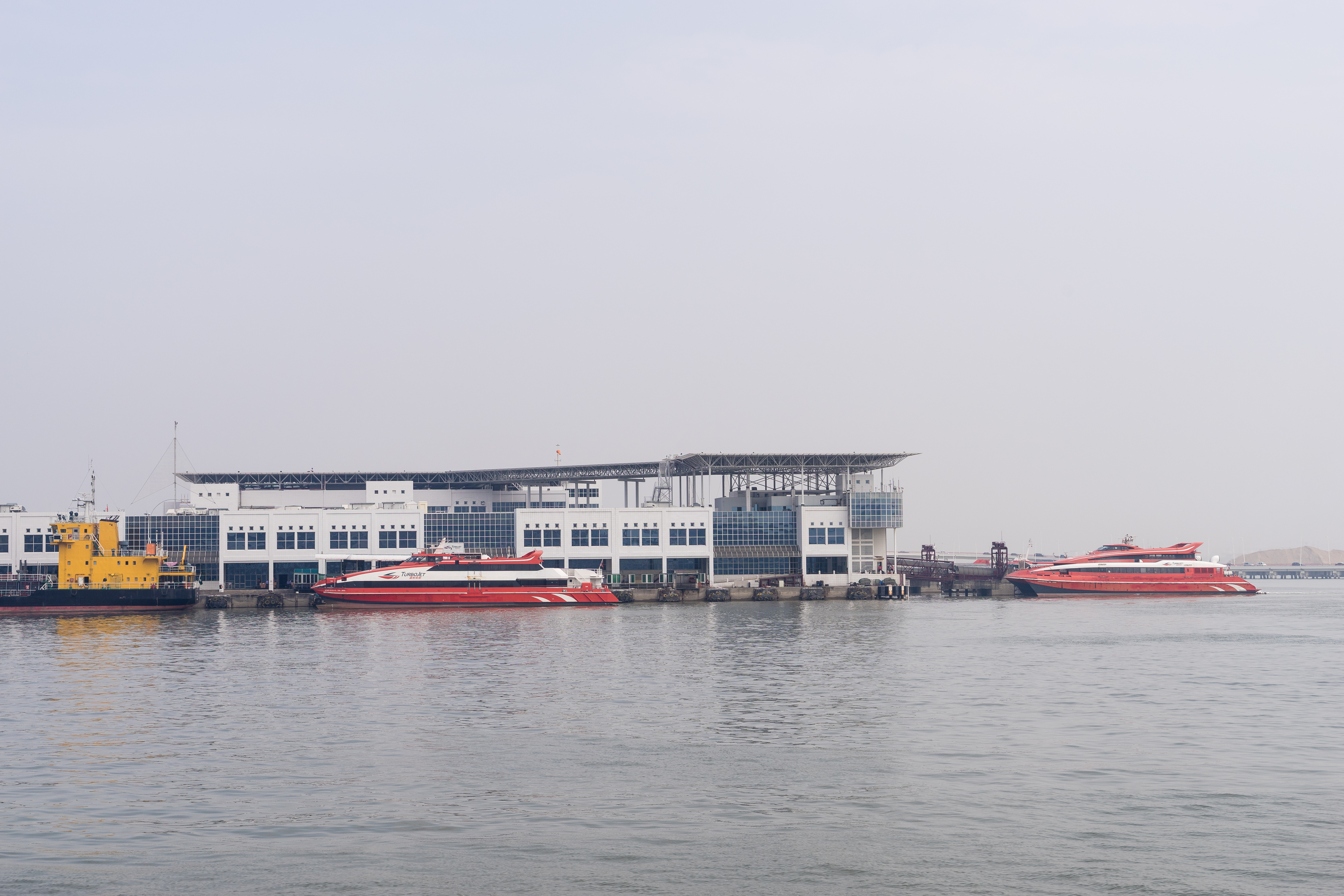
Outer Harbour Ferry Terminal, Macau

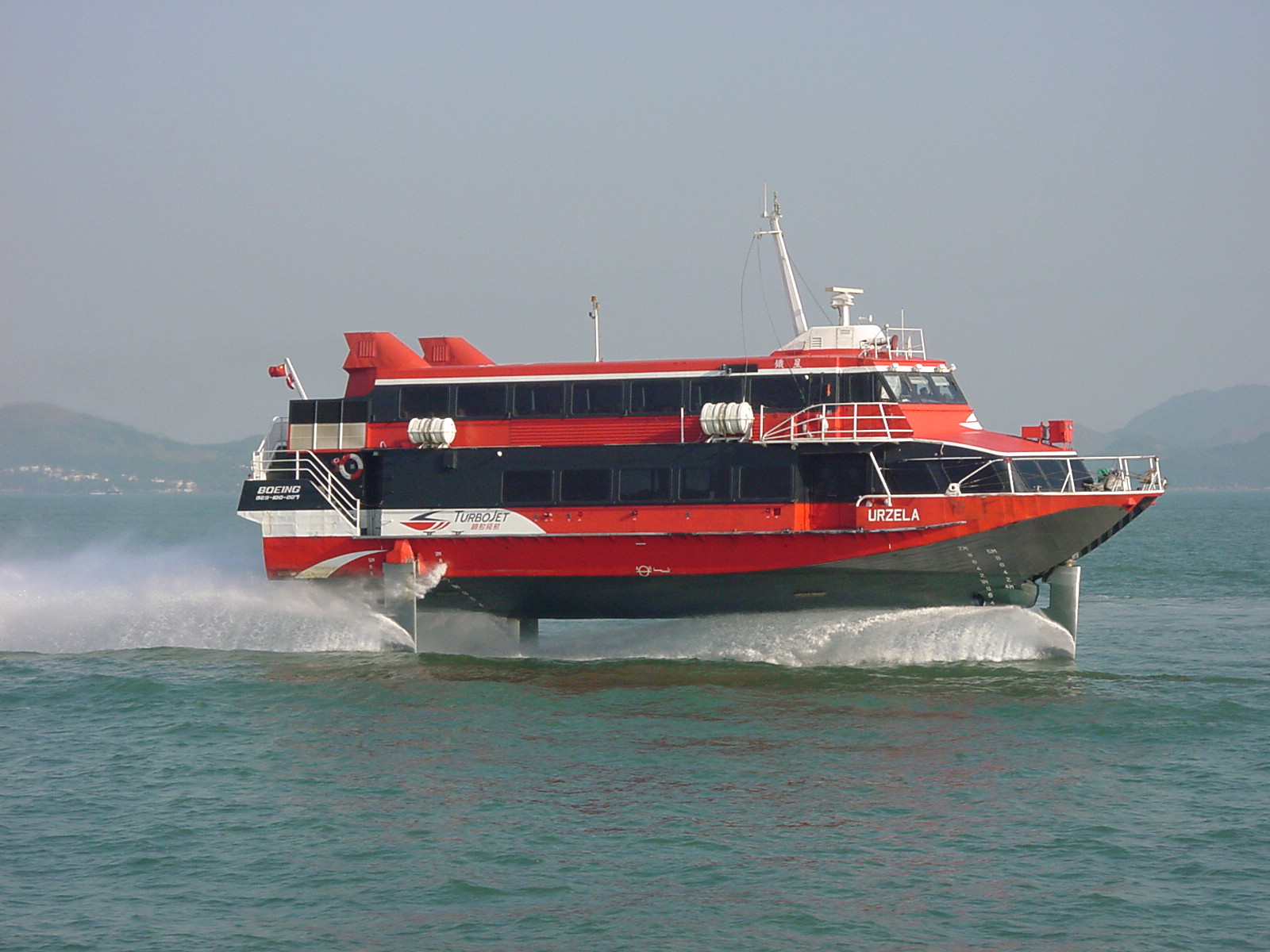
TurboJET's Jetfoil (model Boeing 929)

Over 150 sea-crossing services are scheduled daily between Macau and Hong Kong, and the Outer Harbour Ferry Terminal serves as the major terminal for Macau's passenger traffic by sea. The route is served by high speed catamarans (with passenger capacity of about 400) and jetfoils (with passenger capacity of about 260) and the journey takes approximately one hour. There are also daily scheduled ferry services between Macau and Shenzhen. At present the services are operated by TurboJET from Sheung Wan, Tsim Sha Tsui and Hong Kong International Airport. Cotai Water Jet also operates services between Taipa Ferry Terminal and the Sheung Wan, Tsim Sha Tsui and Hong Kong International Airport. Apart from the sea routes there are also regular scheduled helicopter services between Hong Kong and Macau, which are operated by Sky Shuttle. The trip takes approximately 20 minutes.

A sea-crossing service has been launched by TurboJET which travels between the Hong Kong International Airport and Macau. This differs from the above Macau-Hong Kong route since travelers who arrive in Hong Kong by air do not have to go through Hong Kong immigration's passport control and can board a direct ferry to Macau through a special transfer terminal within the airport. On the return trip, travelers can directly reach the Hong Kong International Airport by ferry (a dedicated check-in desk for the service is available at the Hong Kong-Macau Ferry Terminal) and arrive at the airport without going through Hong Kong immigration's passport control, though airline check-in has to be done for some airlines within the airport prior to boarding a plane. Later on, the Cotai Water Jet launched the same service linking Hong Kong Airport and Macau but mostly embarked at Taipa Ferry Terminal.

A new ferry terminal in Taipa, which is adjacent to the Macau International Airport, was opened in 2017 and some of the passenger traffic by sea will be diverted to the new facility. It is expected to act as a major hub for passenger transfer between the Hong Kong International Airport and the Macau International Airport.

From the Inner Harbour Ferry Terminal (Terminal Marítimo de Passageiros do Porto Interior), ferry services were available between Macau and Wanzai, Zhuhai until January, 2016 due to safety issues at the Wanzai Ferry Terminal. On 31 December 2019, the Macau government announced that the Wanzai Port will officially reopen on January 23 with an hourly immigration capacity of 3,840 crossings. To transport passengers between Macau and Zhuhai, the mainland ferry company Yuet Tung will arrange one ferry every 15 minutes, amounting to four ferries every hour. Each ferry can take a maximum of 280 passengers.

=== Air ===
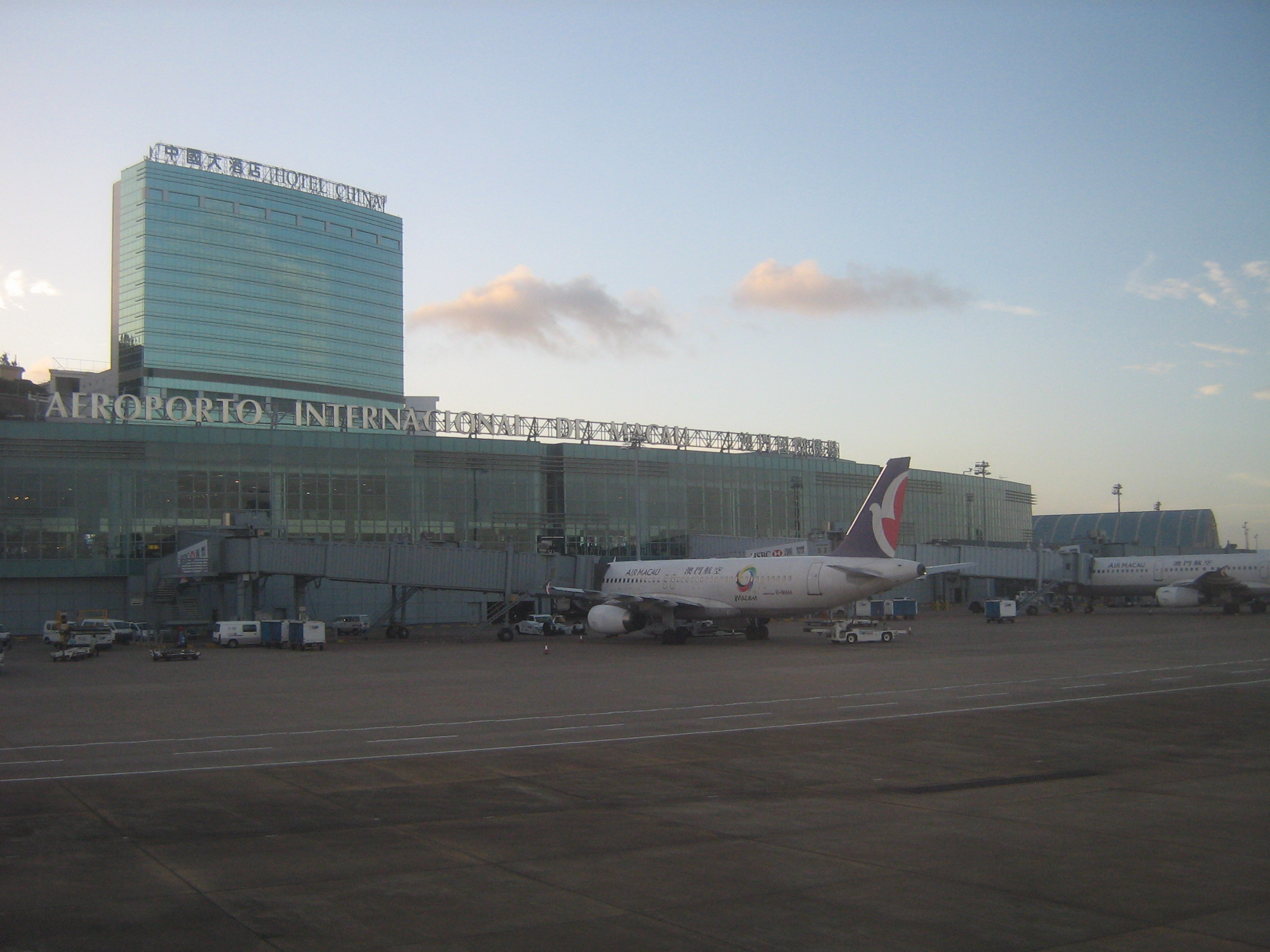
Macau International Airport

Air service in Macau began in the 1930s with Pan American Airways operating seaplanes from Macau to Hong Kong and lasted until 1941. In 1948 Cathay Pacific Airways commenced Hong Kong to Macau seaplane service under their subsidiary Macau Air Transport Company (MATCO). MATCO operated from the Outer Harbour Terminal along Avenida da Amizade to Kai Tak Airport in Hong Kong. The scheduled passenger service continued until 1961 when MATCO ceased operations.

The Macau International Airport, located at Taipa, serves as the terminal for Macau's international air traffic. It was inaugurated on 9 November 1995 and has since established a number of regular flights between Macau and major cities in Northeast and Southeast Asia, such as Bangkok, Beijing, Kaohsiung, Kuala Lumpur, Manila, Osaka, Seoul, Shanghai, Singapore, and Taipei.

Passengers who would like to enter mainland China by land can use the "Two Customs, One Checkpoint" service (or the AIR-TO-LAND Flow Express Bus – Two Customs, One Checkpoint) provided by the Macau International Airport. Passengers can request the "Express Link" service at the check-in counter of their respective airlines. When arriving at the Macau International Airport, they can simply follow the "Express Link" signs and board the Air-to-Land transfer. Passengers do not have to go through Macau's immigration and customs checkpoint until they reach the border of mainland China.

Owing to its relatively low landing fees and the business opportunities brought by the booming gaming industry in Macau, the airport has attracted several of Asia's low-cost carriers such as AirAsia, Tigerair, Cebu Pacific, etc. to establish regular flights between Macau and several major cities in Southeast Asia. As a result, it has been gradually developing into a major hub for low-cost air travel within the region. Other traditional carriers, such as the local flag carrier Air Macau, the Taiwanese carrier EVA Air, and even carriers which operate similar routes from Hong Kong, are facing potential challenges from these newcomers.

Due to a lack of intercontinental flights from Macau, air passengers are also served by Hong Kong International Airport and Shenzhen Bao'an International Airport. Passengers can take ferries from the Outer Harbor and Taipa terminals to the Skypier in Hong Kong, or Fuyong Ferry Terminal in Shenzhen, without clearing customs or immigration at the other side. There is also a helicopter service to Shenzhen.

== Roads, bridges and tunnels ==
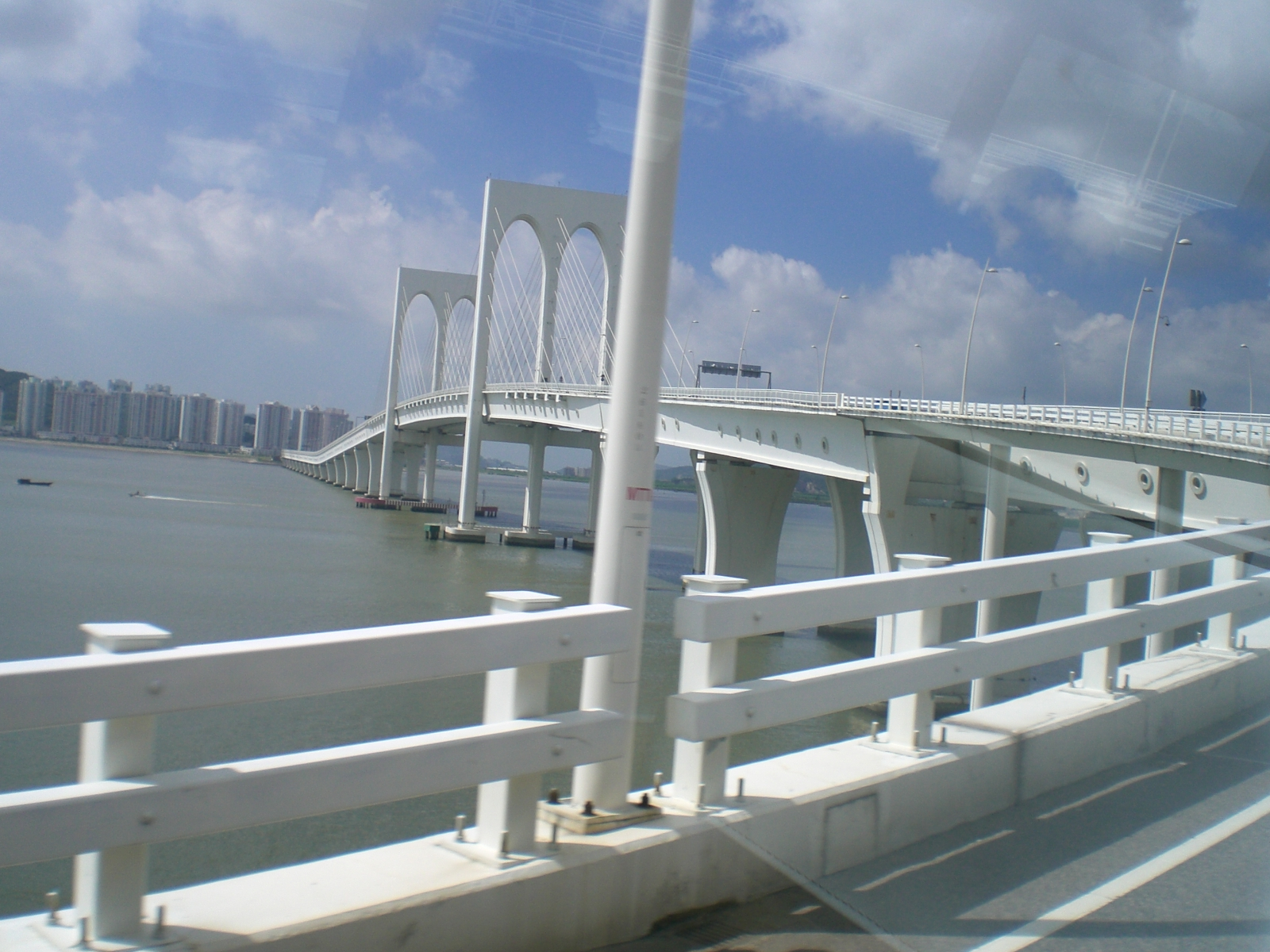
Macau Sai Van Bridge.

Macau has 321 kilometres of public roads, four bridges (viaducts) linking the Macau Peninsula and Taipa, and a tunnel through the Guia Hill linking the Horta e Costa area and the New Port Area (NAPE). The four bridges are (from east to west) Macau Bridge, the Friendship Bridge (Ponte de Amizade); the Macau-Taipa Bridge (Ponte Governador Nobre de Carvalho); and the Sai Van Bridge (Ponte de Sai Van).

The Lotus Bridge links Cotai with the Hengqin island of Zhuhai. Unlike mainland China, where traffic drives on the right, traffic in Macau and Hong Kong drives on the left, therefore a special design has been used to build this bridge to facilitate the change in driving directions.

Roads are generally narrow at the heart of the city and parked cars are always found on both sides of the road. Traffic congestion has been a major problem throughout the day owing to the lack of an efficient mass transit system and a relatively high car to population ratio.

There are four land cross-border checkpoints, Portas do Cerco, Parque Industrial Transfronteiriço, located at Ilha Verde, Cotai (Lotus) Checkpoint, and the Hong Kong–Zhuhai–Macau Bridge Checkpoint for connection Mainland China. Except for Portas do Cerco, which operates from 06:00 to 01:00, the other checkpoints are in 24-hour operation.

The recent opening of the Hong Kong–Zhuhai–Macau Bridge, opened in October 2018 has formed the first single road link between Hong Kong, Macau and mainland China at Zhuhai. This 50 km link consists of a series of bridges and tunnels crossing the Lingdingyang channel, that connects these three major cities on the Pearl River Delta in China.

== Ports ==
- Macau Container Port, located at the Inner Harbour area on the west side of the Macau peninsula
- Ká Hó Port, located on the Coloane Island

== Airports ==
=== Airports ===
There is only one airport located within Macau. Service began in 1995. Previously, seaplanes operated in Macau.

Location	ICAO	IATA	Airport name
Taipa Island (Ilha da Taipa)	VMMC	MFM	Macau International Airport

=== Heliports and helipads ===
There are two heliports in Macau.

Location	ICAO	IATA	Airport name
Taipa Island (Ilha da Taipa)	VMMC	MFM	Macau International Airport
Macau Peninsula	VMMH	XZM	Macau Heliport at Outer Harbour Ferry Terminal
