= Sky Shuttle =

Helicopter service operator based in Macau

Sky Shuttle Helicopters Limited 空中快線直升機公司 Helicópteros Aéreos Expressos
- Founded: 1997; 28 years ago; 1998; 27 years ago joint venture
- Hubs: Macau Marine Terminal, Hong Kong-Macau Ferry Terminal, Shenzhen Baoan International Airport
- Focus cities: Hong Kong, Macau, Shenzhen
- Destinations: 3
- Headquarters: Sheung Wan, Hong Kong and Sé, Macau.
- Website: http://www.skyshuttlehk.com/

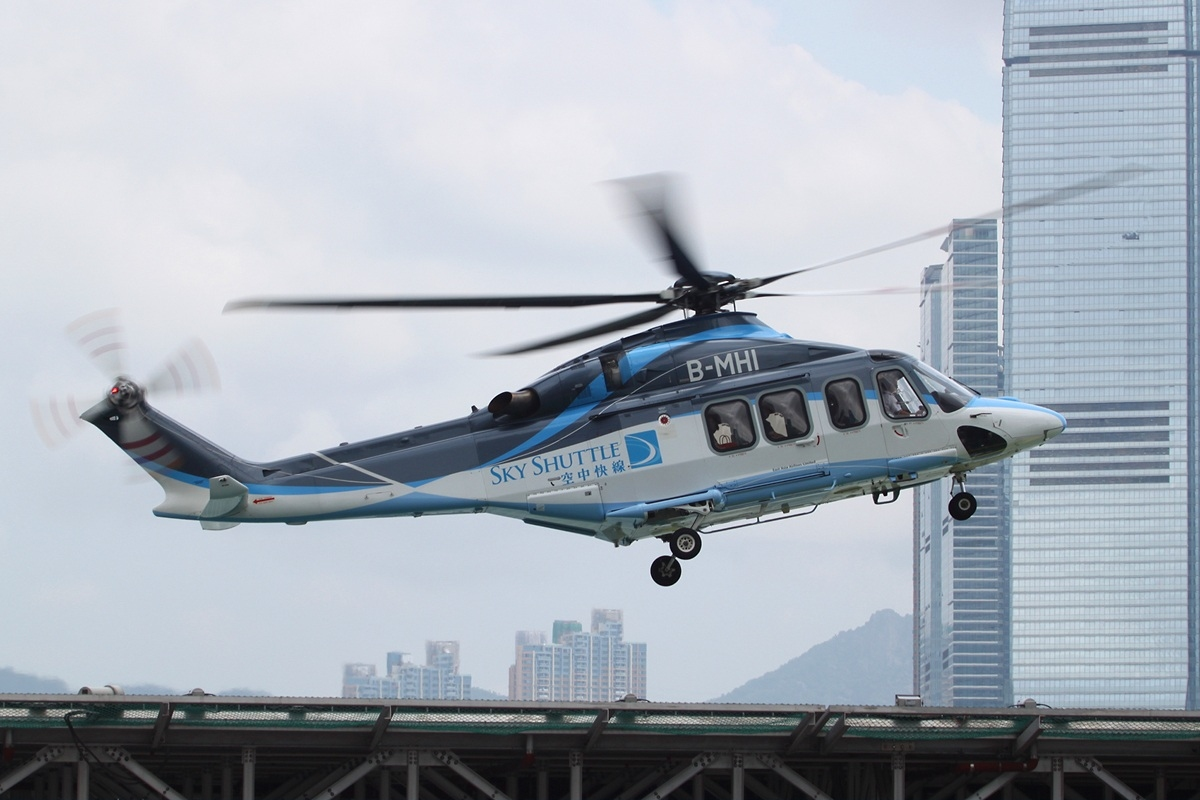
AW-139 of Sky Shuttle Helicopters landing at the Shun Tak Heliport

Sky Shuttle Helicopters Limited (Chinese: 空中快線直升機公司, Portuguese: Helicópteros Aéreos Expressos) is a helicopter service operator based in Macau. Formerly known as Helicopters Hong Kong Limited, it operates helicopter routes between Macau, Hong Kong and Shenzhen.

== History ==
East Asia Airlines Limited was established in July 1988 and Macau-Hong Kong services commenced in November 1990 by using two Bell 222 helicopters with six flights per day. Helicopters Hong Kong Limited ('HeliHK') established in 1997, formed a partnership with East Asia Airlines, to create the largest commercial helicopter operation in the Pearl River Delta region providing shuttle service between Hong Kong and Macau and introduced a fleet change from Bell 222 to Sikorsky S76C+ helicopters. Subsequently, a new company name "Sky Shuttle Helicopters Limited" was launched in November 2008, as part of a new corporate branding exercise. In 2009 another fleet change took place when AgustaWestland AW139 helicopters were purchased to replace the aging S-76C+s.

2010 ditching

The airline's noon departure from Hong Kong for Macau ended in a controlled ditching of one of its AW139s in Victoria Harbour immediately post-takeoff due to a tail rotor failure. The 11 passengers and 2 crew escaped serious injury.

2020 - 2022 - Operations suspended during the period of the global pandemic.

January 26, 2024 - Operations resumed for scheduled flights 5 days per week and 7 flights per day between Macau - Hong Kong and Macau - Shenzhen.

== Services ==
=== Shuttle service ===
Sky Shuttle is the sole commercial helicopter operator between HK, Macau and Shenzhen, PRC, with Sky Shuttle operating 35 flights weekly between Macau Maritime Terminal and Hong Kong-Macau Ferry Terminal in Hong Kong from 9 am to 8 pm, and 5 flights per week between Macau Maritime Terminal and Shenzhen Baoan International Airport, all of about 15 minutes duration.

=== Charter services ===
Sky Shuttle also operates services for sightseeing, aerial photography and general private charter.

== Heliports ==
- Sky Shuttle Heliport renamed from Shun Tak Heliport 2nd Helipad added 2009
- Shun Tak Heliport, at the Hong Kong Macau Ferry Terminal, Shun Tak Centre, 200 Connaught Road Central, Hong Kong - 1 pad built in 1986,
- Macau Heliport at 3/F Macau Maritime Terminal, Avenida da Amizade, Macau - 5 pads upgraded in 2001
- Shenzhen Heliport at 3/F of Shenzhen Baoan International Airport Terminal, Shenzhen, China

== Fleet ==
As of July 2016, Sky Shuttle operates AgustaWestland AW139 helicopters.

=== Formerly operated ===
- Bell 222
- Sikorsky S-76

Also previously operated by Helicopters Hong Kong were

- Aérospatiale SA 315B Lama
- Eurocopter AS350
- Bell 206

== See also ==
- List of companies of Macau
