= Macau Container Port =

Small container port facility in Macau, China

Macau Container Port is a small container port facility in Macau, China. The port is located next to Macau International Airport.

== History ==
The port was opened in 1991.

== See also ==
- Kai Ho Port
- Transport in Macau
