= Inner Harbour Ferry Terminal =

Coordinates: 22°11′41.2″N 113°32′7.2″E

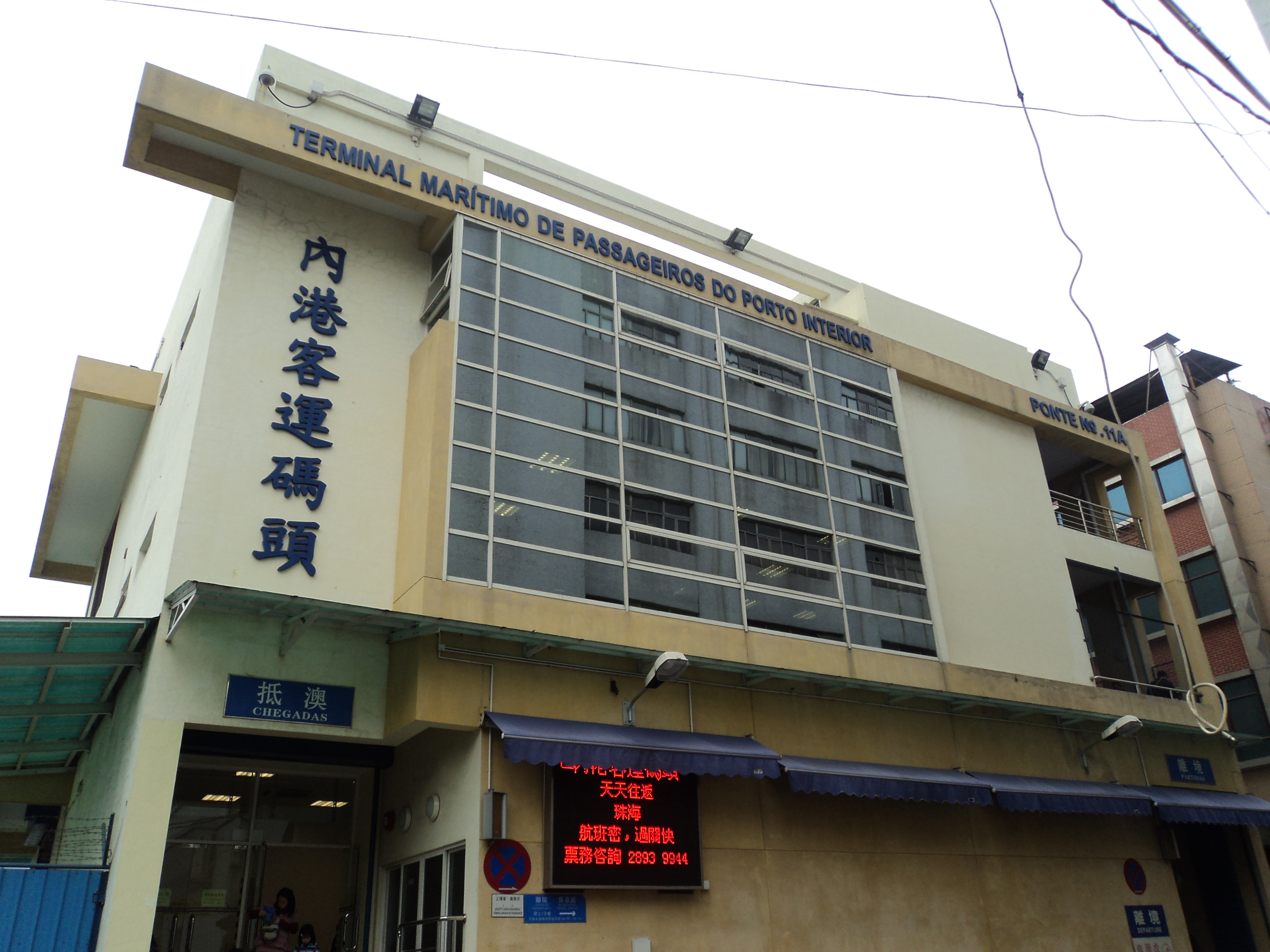
- The appearance of the pier building

Chinese name
- Traditional Chinese: 內港客運碼頭
- Simplified Chinese: 内港客运码头
Transcriptions
Standard Mandarin
- Hanyu Pinyin: Nèi Gǎng Kèyùn Mǎtóu
Yue: Cantonese
- Jyutping: noi6 gong2 haak3 wan6 maa5 tau4

Portuguese name
- Portuguese: Terminal Marítimo de Passageiros do Porto Interior

The Inner Harbour Ferry Terminal (Chinese: 內港客運碼頭; Portuguese: Terminal Marítimo de Passageiros do Porto Interior) is a passenger pier in São Lourenço, Macau, China. The ferry terminal is dedicated for ferries to the nearby Wanzai, Zhuhai.

== History ==
The former Yutong pier was part of the Ponte 16 project. The no. 14 pier was demolished and the new terminal at no. 11A was built to replace it. In order to reduce high speed ferries' influence on the other harbour users, the Macau - Shekou and Macau - Jiangmen services were moved to Taipa Ferry Terminal from 24 September 2009 and 29 January 2010 respectively. Today the terminal only provide one cross-harbour service between Macau and Zhuhai.

In 2016, the Wanzai Port closed in order to undergo a general upgrading of its facilities. On 30 December 2019, the local government announced that the Wanzai Port will officially reopen on 23 January 2020 with an hourly immigration capacity of 3,840 crossings. To transport passengers between Macau and Zhuhai, the mainland ferry company Yuet Tung will arrange one ferry every 15 minutes, amounting to four ferries every hour. Each ferry can take a maximum of 280 passengers.

== Facilities ==
The terminal occupies 900 sq metre. There are three floors. On the ground floor are six departure service desks. On the first floor are six arrival service desks. Second floor is for office use. After refurbishments in 2019, the arrival hall will consist of six e-crossing channels and two manual channels. Another three back-up manual channels will be available inside a visa office. In total, these channels are expected to register 1,710 crossings on an hourly basis.

== Operating hours ==
Before its closure in 2016, ferries between Macau and Zhuhai operate between 8:00am and 16:30pm at half hour intervals, with a lunch break from 11:30 to 13:00. From 23 January 2020, the new port will be open for 15 hours per day from 7 a.m. to 10 p.m. with one crossing departing every 15 minutes.

The fare was RMB12 per adult and RMB5 per child in 2016. From 23 January 2020, residents of Macau and Zhuhai will enjoy a discounted ferry fare. Traveling from Macau to Zhuhai, residents of these two cities will pay 20 patacas for a single trip or 30 patacas for a round trip. From Zhuhai to Macau, fares for a single and a round trip will be 15 and 25 yuan, respectively.

The ferries are operated by Yuet Tong Shipping.

== See also ==
- Transport in Macau
