= Speed limits in China =

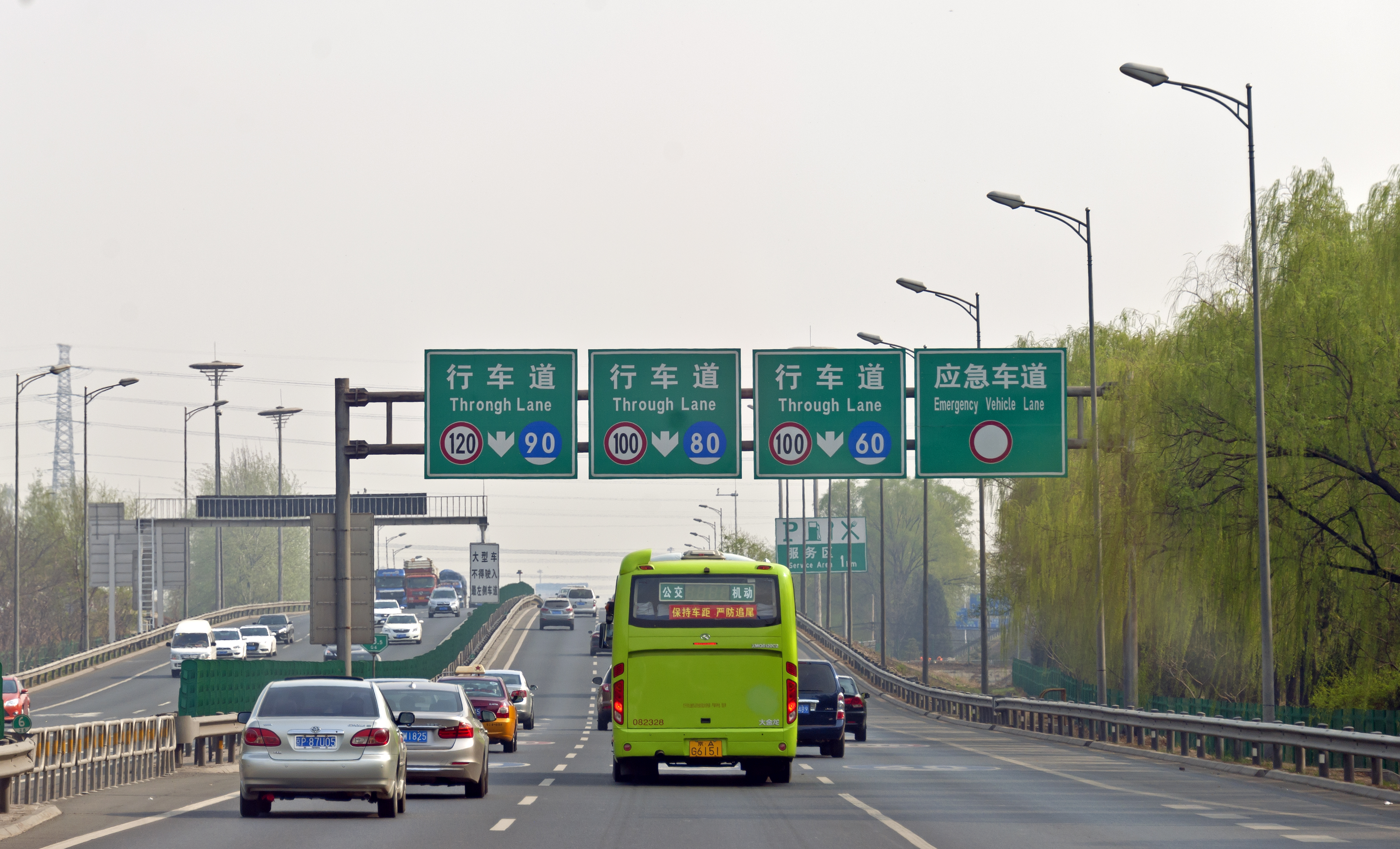
A speed limit sign of expressway in China, with the instructions of minimum and maximum speed by lane.

Expressways in mainland China were speed limited to 120 km/h (75 mph) since the PRC's first road-related law, the Road Traffic Safety Law of the People's Republic of China, came into effect on 1 May 2004.

Semi-expressways and city express routes (called kuàisù gōnglù (Chinese: 快速公路) in Chinese, meaning "high speed public road") generally have lower speed limits of 100 km/h (62 mph), in some cases the speed limit may be lower.

On China National Highways (which are not expressways), a common speed limit is 80 km/h (50 mph). In some localities, speed limits may drop to 40 km/h (25 mph).

On some designated "fast through routes" in cities, speed limits are up to 80 km/h (50 mph). Otherwise, speed limits are 70 km/h (43 mph) on roads with two uninterrupted yellow lines and 60 km/h (37 mph) or 50 km/h (31 mph) otherwise. Signage in towns and on expressways is often present.

Minimum speed limits on expressways vary. A general minimum speed limit of 60 km/h (37 mph) is in force at all times (although traffic jams thwart it).

On expressways in mainland China, automobiles are generally 100–120 km/h, while buses and trucks are generally limited to 80–100 km/h. Other road conditions are the same as those of automobiles. In the Hong Kong Special Administrative Region, expressways are usually 80 km/h; in the Macao Special Administrative Region, the speed limit is 80 km/h (Hong Kong-Zhuhai-Macao Bridge).
