= Regulation of motorcycle access on freeways =

Motorway Ahead and restriction sign in Ireland: 1. Learner Permit Drivers; 2. Vehicles under 50cc; 3. Slow vehicles; 4. Invalid Carriages; 5. Pedal Cycles (Bicycles); 6. Pedestrians; 7. Animals

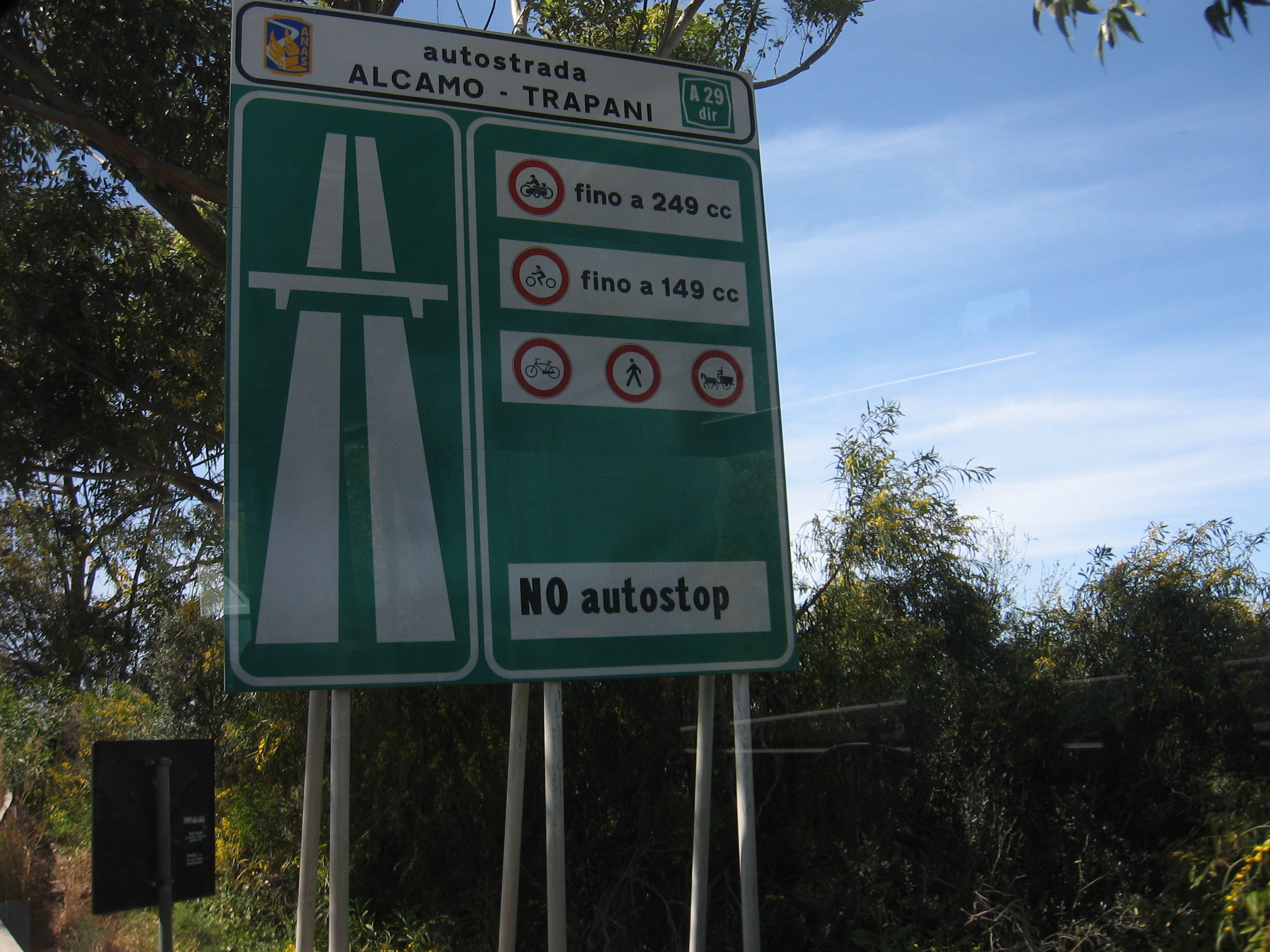
Motorway restriction sign in Italy (Autostrada): 1. Sidecars and Trikes up to 249cc Prohibited; 2. Motorcycles up to 149cc Prohibited; 3. Bicycles, Pedestrians, Oxcarts Prohibited

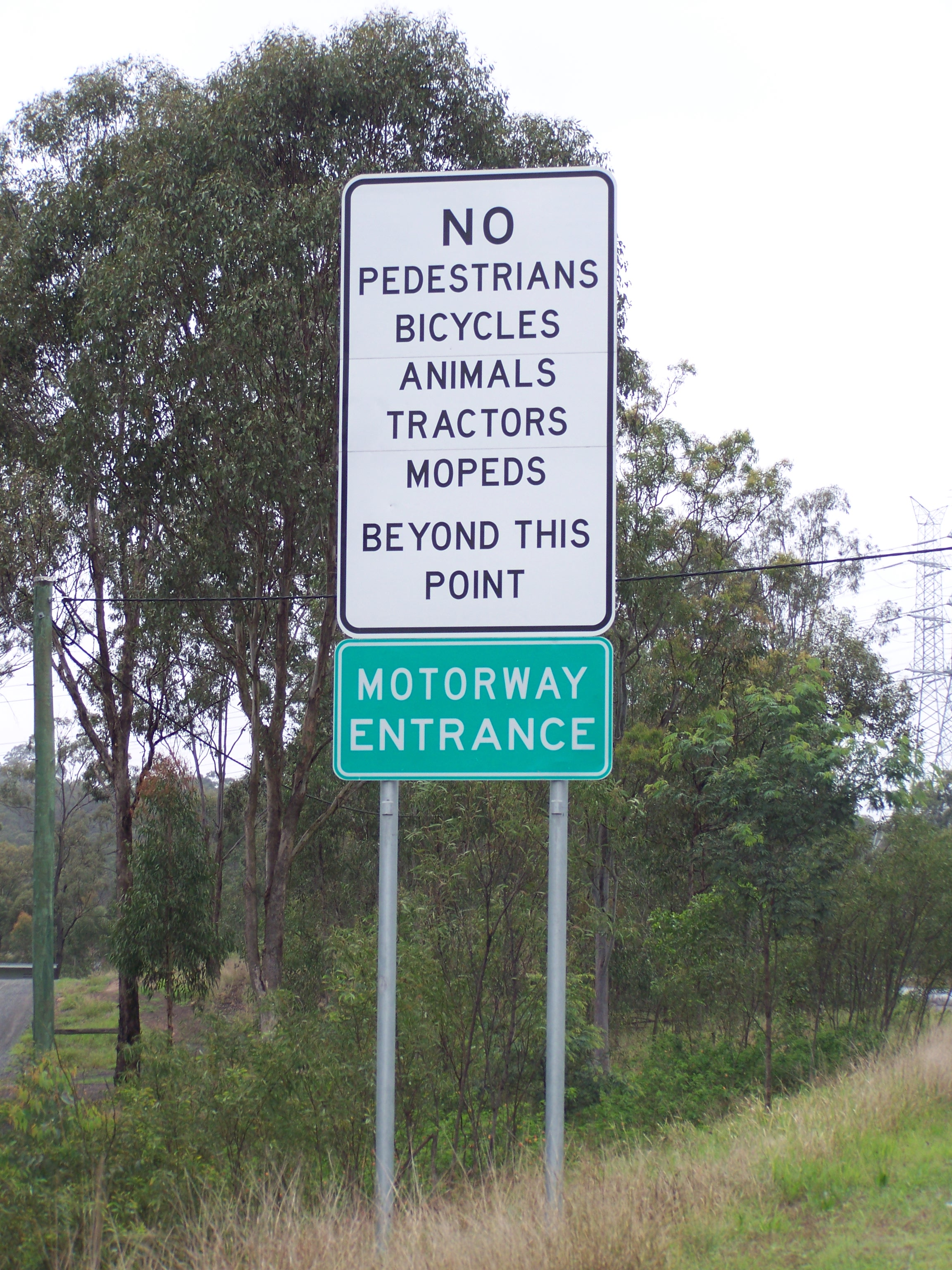
Australian Motorway Entrance and restriction signs: 1. Pedestrians; 2. Bicycles; 3. Animals; 4. Tractors; 5. Mopeds (Motorcycles under 49cc or 50cc)

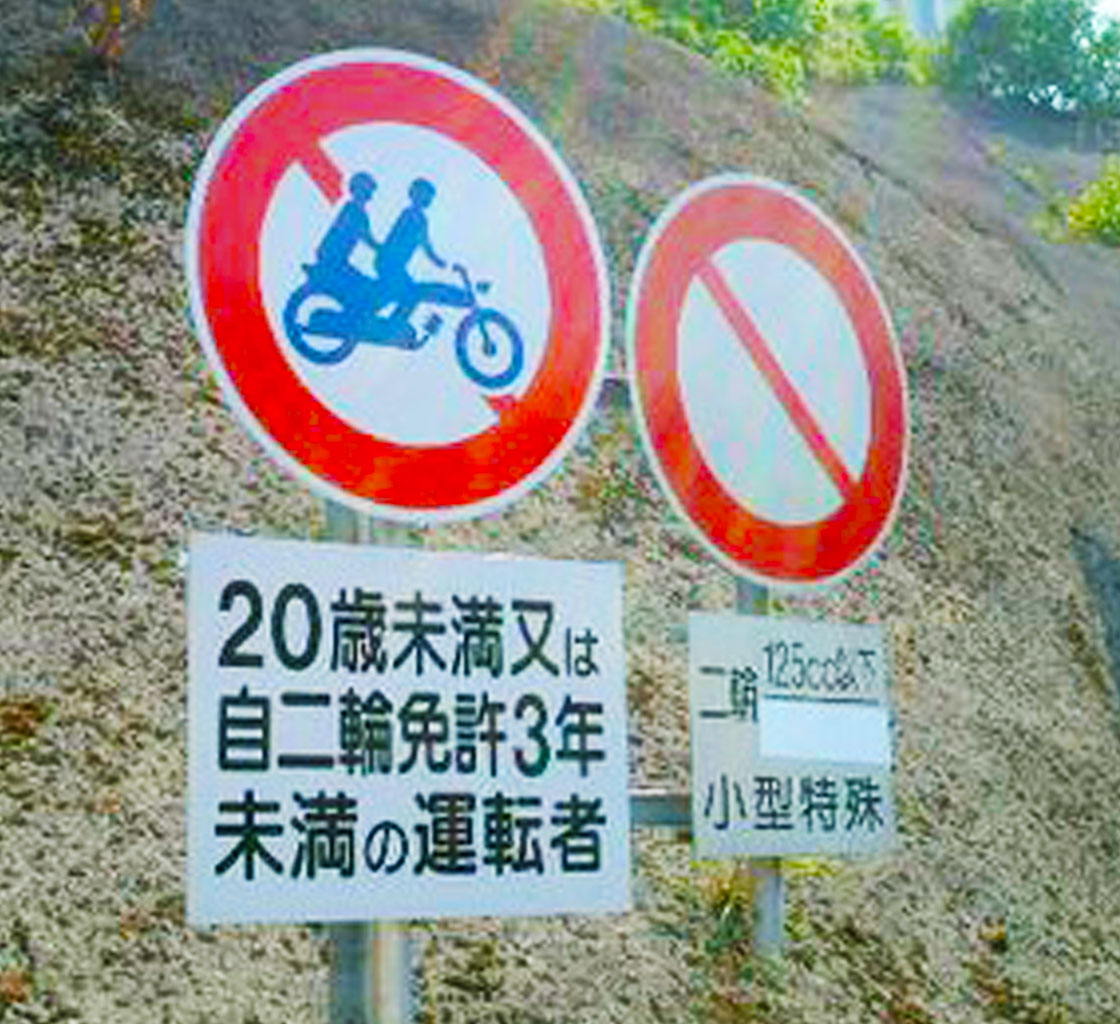
Japanese traffic signs near motorway entrance. No pillion passenger for a driver under 20 or with less than 3 years experience (left) Road closed for two-wheeled vehicles under 125cc and heavy equipment (right)

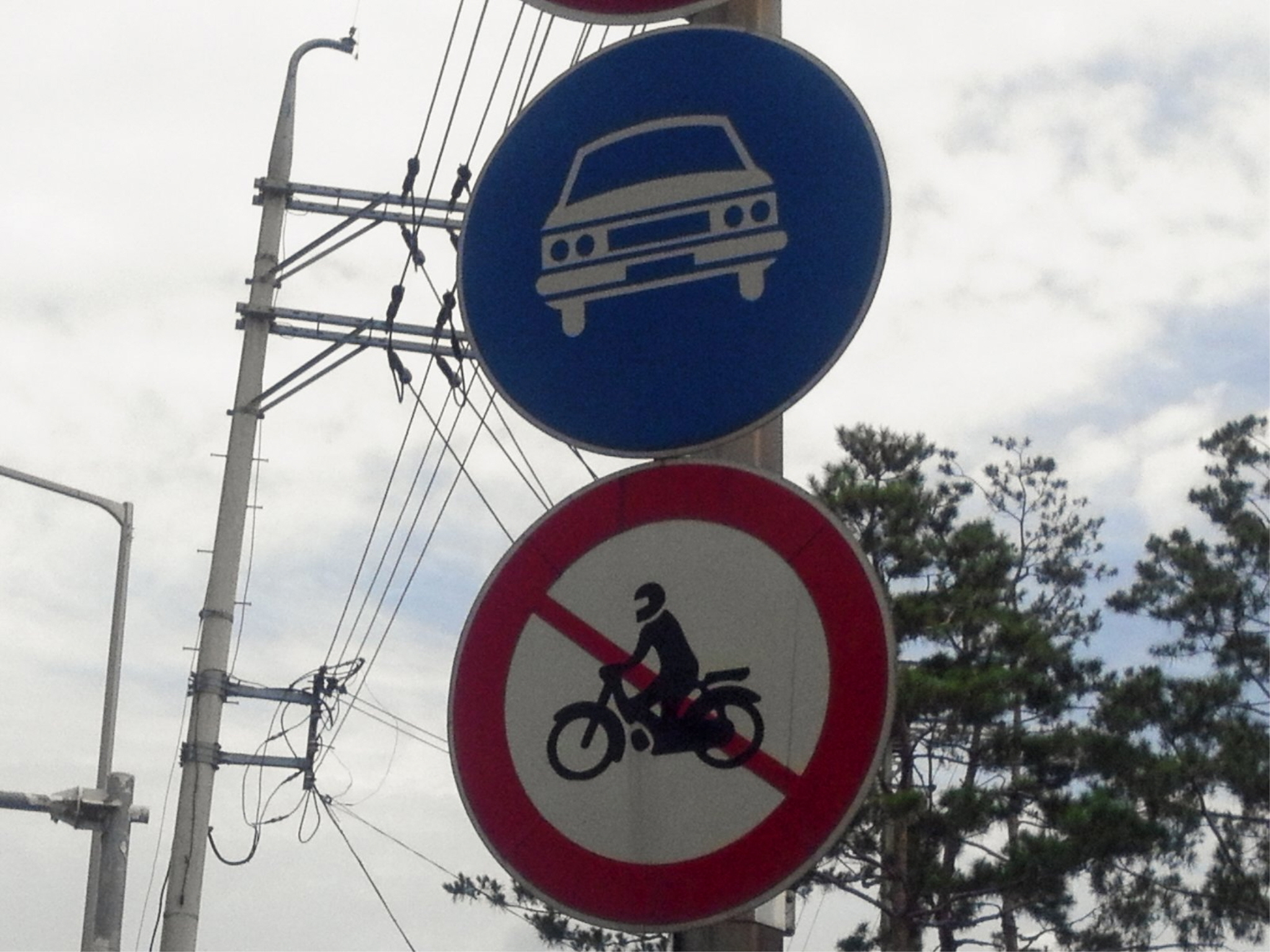
Freeway sign and Motorcycles Prohibited sign in South Korea

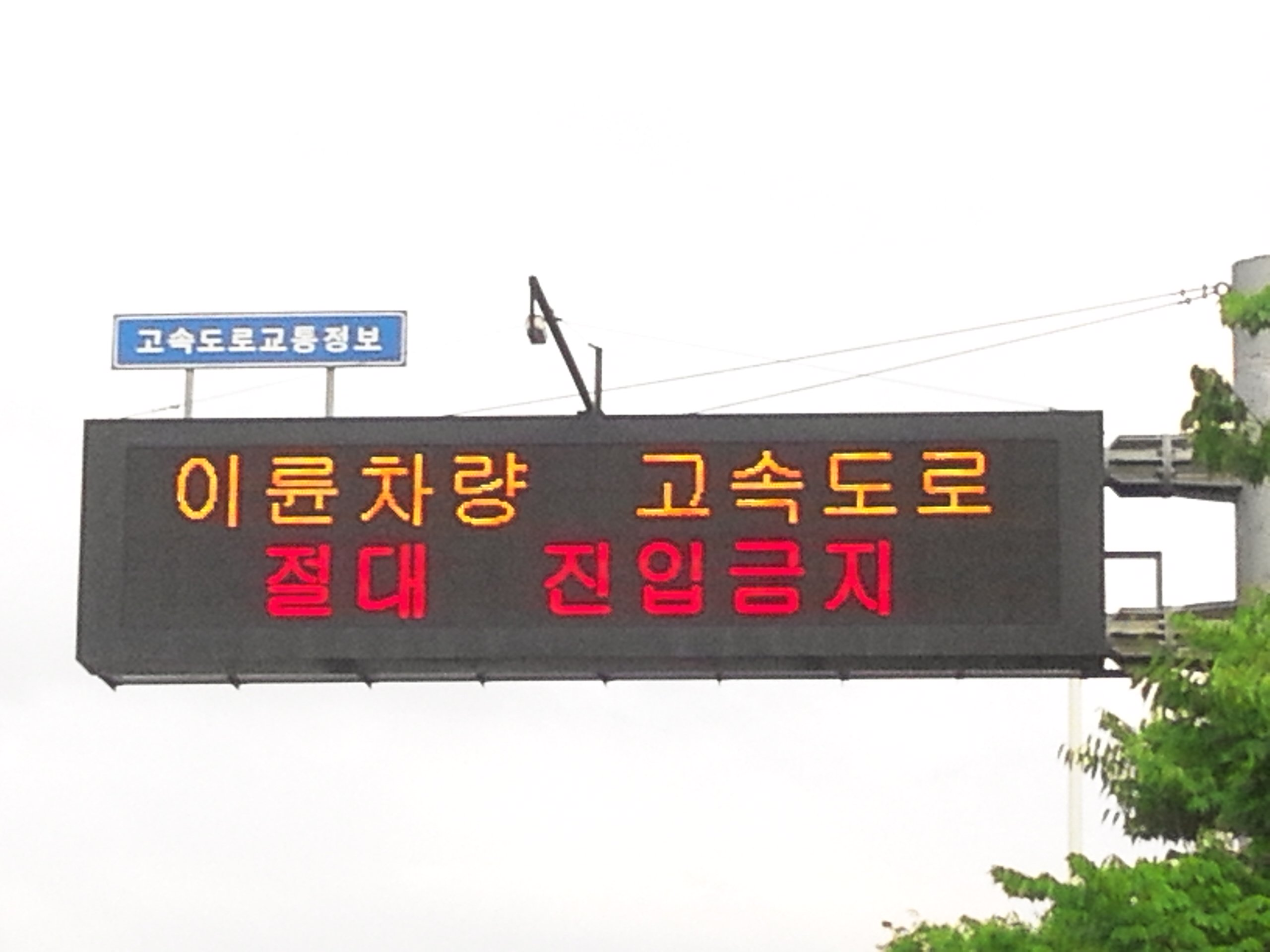
Information for Motorcycles Prohibited in South Korea Expressway

Regulation of motorcycle access on freeways is regulation of the freeway (controlled-access highway) and expressway (limited-access road) access of motorcycles in most nations.

== Access regulation ==
Freeway access regulation for motorcycles differs from country to country. In most countries, regulation is based on engine displacement.

Country	Access Status	Access Condition (engine displacement)	Note
Austria	Permitted	More than 49cc or 50cc	EU Member state
Australia	Permitted	More than 49cc or 50cc	
Belarus	Permitted	More than 49cc or 50cc	
Belgium	Permitted	More than 49cc or 50cc	EU Member state
Bolivia	Permitted	All	
Brazil	Permitted	More than 49cc or 50cc	
Bulgaria	Permitted	More than 49cc or 50cc	EU Member state
Canada	Permitted	More than 49cc or 50cc	
China	Restricted	Vehicle capable of going over 70 km/h de jure	There is no specific law prohibiting motorcycle access on freeways as long as a vehicle can exceed 70 km/h, de jure. However, many provinces have made other laws to prohibit motorcycle from driving on freeways.
Chile	Permitted	More than 49cc or 50cc	
Czech	Permitted	More than 49cc or 50cc	EU Member state
Denmark	Permitted	More than 49cc or 50cc	EU Member state
Finland	Permitted	More than 49cc or 50cc	EU Member state
France	Permitted	More than 49cc or 50cc	EU Member state
Germany	Permitted	Vehicle is capable of going over 60 km/h	EU Member state
Hong Kong	Permitted	More than 124cc	
Hungary	Permitted	More than 49cc or 50cc	EU Member state
Indonesia	Prohibited		1. Prohibited day: Since the first day the first highway open to public 2. Exceptions: Bali Mandara Toll Road
Ireland	Permitted	More than 49cc or 50cc	EU Member state
Italy	Permitted	More than 149cc	EU Member state, sidecar more than 249cc
Japan	Permitted	More than 125cc	
Kenya	Prohibited		
Luxembourg	Permitted	More than 49cc or 50cc	EU Member state
Malaysia	Permitted	More than 49cc or 50cc	
Mexico	Permitted	More than 49cc or 50cc	
Netherlands	Permitted	More than 49cc or 50cc	EU Member
Norway	Permitted	More than 49cc or 50cc	
New Zealand	Permitted	More than 49cc or 50cc	
Pakistan	Permitted	More than 599 or 600cc	In March 2019, the country's High Administrative Court ruled that the ban on motorcycles on highways was not applicable.
Peru	Permitted	More than 49cc or 50cc	
Philippines	Permitted	More than 400cc	Date of motorcycle driving prohibited on freeways: February 19, 1968; Motorcycle driving prohibition lifted on freeways: 2001 (above 400cc), 2006 (some tollways)
Poland	Permitted	More than 49cc or 50cc	EU Member state
Portugal	Permitted	More than 49cc or 50cc	EU Member state
Romania	Permitted	More than 49cc or 50cc	EU Member state
Russia	Permitted	More than 49cc or 50cc	
Singapore	Permitted	More than 49cc or 50cc	
Slovakia	Permitted	More than 49cc or 50cc	EU Member state
Slovenia	Permitted	More than 49cc or 50cc	EU Member state
South Africa	Permitted	More than 50cc	
South Korea	Prohibited		1. Motorcycles' access on expressways (고속도로 gosok doro) was prohibited by a Notice of the Ministry of Home Affairs on 1 June 1972; 2. Motorcycles' access on expressways and semi-expressways (자동차전용도로 jadongcha jeonyong doro, literally 'motor vehicles only road') was prohibited by a Road Traffic Act amendment in 1992
Spain	Permitted	More than 49cc or 50cc	EU Member state
Sweden	Permitted	More than 49cc or 50cc	EU Member state
Switzerland	Permitted	More than 51cc and vehicle is capable of going over 80 km/h	
Taiwan	Prohibited		1. The ban was partially lifted for motorcycles above 550cc for expressways (freeway with lower speed limit) on 1 November 2007 and also for 250cc and above on 1 July 2012. Original ban for freeway still exists.
Thailand	Prohibited		Prohibited since 8 May 1979
Turkey	Permitted	More than 49cc or 50cc	
United States	Permitted	More than 49cc or 50cc	Some states prohibit motor-driven cycles (under 125cc or 150cc) or low-horsepower motorcycles (example: motorcycle less than 5 HP)
United Kingdom	Permitted	More than 49cc or 50cc	
Venezuela	Prohibited		Prohibited day: unknown
Vietnam	Prohibited		1. The 2008 Law on Road Traffic, Article 26, Clause 4.; 2. Specialized vehicles (Vietnamese: xe máy chuyên dùng, literally "motorcycles with specific purpose"), including motorcycles, with a design speed of over 70km/h should be allowed to enter the expressway.
■ Permitted: Motorcycles permitted on freeways and expressways ■ Restricted: Motorcycles generally restricted on freeways and expressways, with some exceptions ■ Prohibited: Motorcycles prohibited on freeways and expressways, except for emergency motorcycles

== List of speed limits ==
Maximum speed limit on expressways or motorways/freeways
Country	Maximum speed limit (km/h)	
Country	Automobiles	Motorcycles
Belarus	110	90
Bulgaria	140	100
China	120	80
Greece	130	80
Russia	110	90
Turkey	120 (Expressways: 110)	100 if L3 (expressways: 90 if L3)
Japan	120; 100 (statutory)	120; 100 (statutory – 80 until 2000)
Ukraine	130 (dual carriageway 110)	80
Vietnam	120	70 (for 2 wheeler motorcycles)

== See also ==
- Freeway motorcycling restrictions in East Asia
- Speed limits by country
