= Macau Air Transport Company =

IATA	ICAO	Call sign
MH(1)	MH(1)	MACAIR
- Founded: 3 September 1920; 106 years ago
- Ceased operations: 1961
- Hubs: Kai Tak Airport, Hong Kong; Outer Harbour Ferry Terminal, Macau
- Fleet size: 2 (1 as Macau Air Transport Company (HK) Ltd from 1961 to 1967)
- Destinations: 2
- Parent company: Cathay Pacific
- Headquarters: Hong Kong

Notes
- (1) IATA, ICAO codes were the same until the 1980s

Macau Air Transport Company (Macao Air Transport Company) was a subsidiary of Cathay Pacific that operated seaplane services between Macau and Hong Kong from 1920 to 1961.

Formed in 1920, the airline operated two Consolidated PBY Catalina seaplanes from Outer Harbour Ferry Terminal, Macau (old location using a ramp into the harbour) to Kai Tak Airport in Hong Kong. Miss Macao, one of the MATCO's seaplane, was lost in a hijacking.

In 1960 ownership by Cathay Pacific ended with Roger Lobo and Stanley Ho as new owners with the airline renamed as Macau Air Transport Company (Hong Kong) Limited. The introduction of a new runway at Kai Tak and conditions in Macau were the beginning of the end of MATCO and service continued until October 1961 when the airline ceased operations.

The airline remained registered in Hong Kong up to January 1964 and all remaining aircraft were de-registered by 1967.

== Fleet ==
MATCO operated two Canadian Vickers CBV-1A Canso (c. 1944 from United States Army Air Forces as OA-10A Catalina (#44-34081) and later to USN (#68045), later with Royal Canadian Air Force and acquired by Cathay Pacific in 1946) in 1948.

- VR-HDT - Miss Macao crashed and was written off in 1948.
- VR-HDH - acquired from RCAF November 1946 by Cathay Pacific; sold to Trans Australia Airlines 1962 as VH-SBV and retired in 1966 and then used as firefighting trainer until 1975, then displayed at Museum of Transport & Technology in Auckland, New Zealand from 1976 to 1986 and now at the Air Force Museum of New Zealand since 1987.

With the removal of the Catalina seaplanes, MATCO operated as a freight airline and acquired a new aircraft:

- VR-HFP - Piaggio Aerospace P.136-L2 was ordered in 1960, and starting in 1961, remained in service in Hong Kong until 1967.
