= Ká-Hó Port =

One of two ports in Macau, China

Coordinates: 22.134320°N 113.584589°E

Ká Hó Port
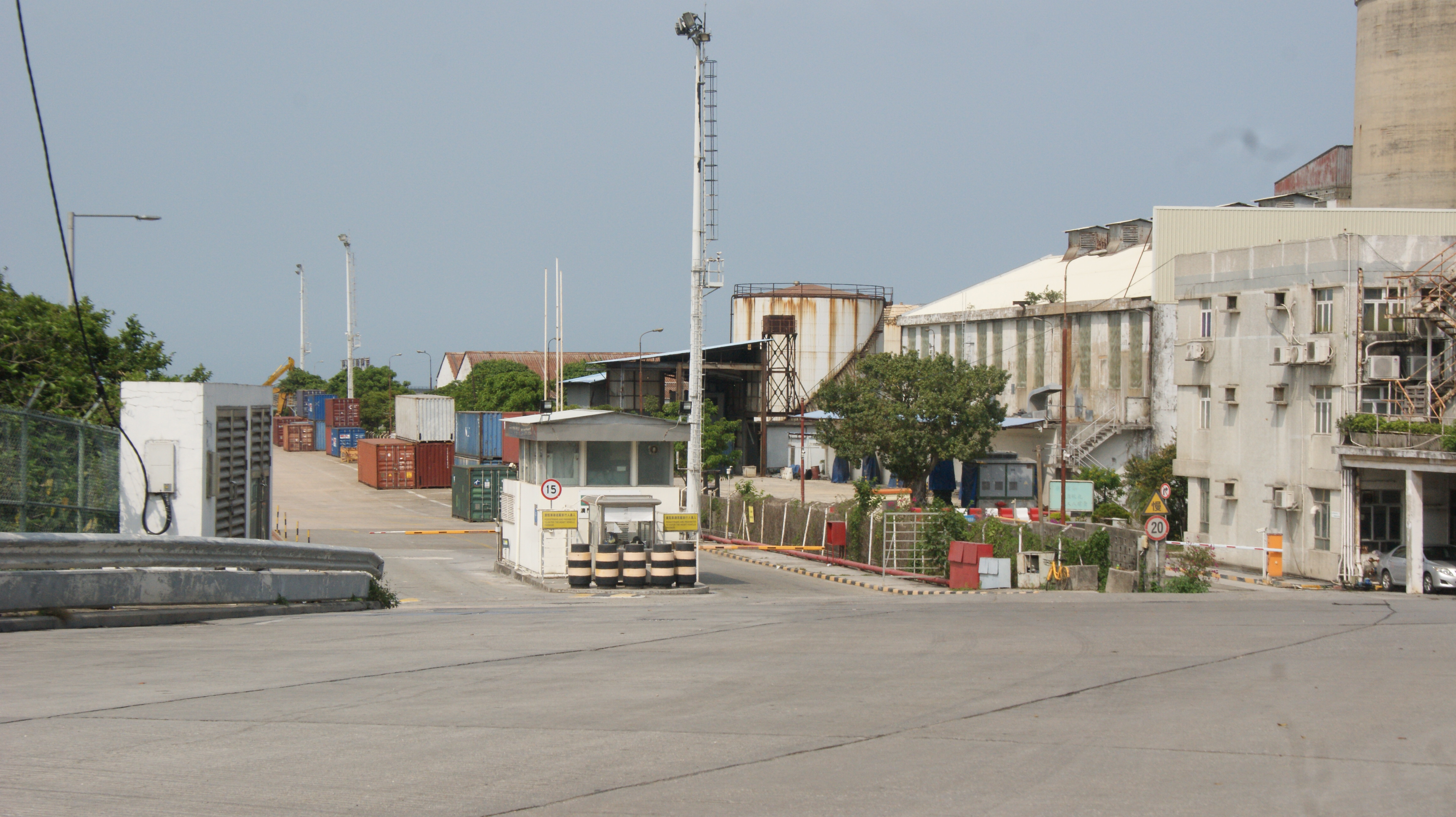
- Interactive map of Ká Hó Port

Location
- Country: China
- Location: Macau

Details
- Type of Harbor: Seaport

Ká-Hó Port

Chinese name
- Chinese: 九澳港
Transcriptions
Standard Mandarin
- Hanyu Pinyin: Jiǔ Ào Gǎng
Yue: Cantonese
- Jyutping: Gau2 Ou3 Gong2

Portuguese name
- Portuguese: Porto de Ká-Hó

Ká Hó Port (Chinese: 九澳港; Portuguese: Porto de Ká-Hó) is one of two ports in Macau, China. It is located on Ilha de Coloane. It is the smaller of Macau's two ports.

== See also ==
- Macau Container Port
