= Jockey Club station =

Macau Light Rapid Transit station

Jockey Clube 馬會
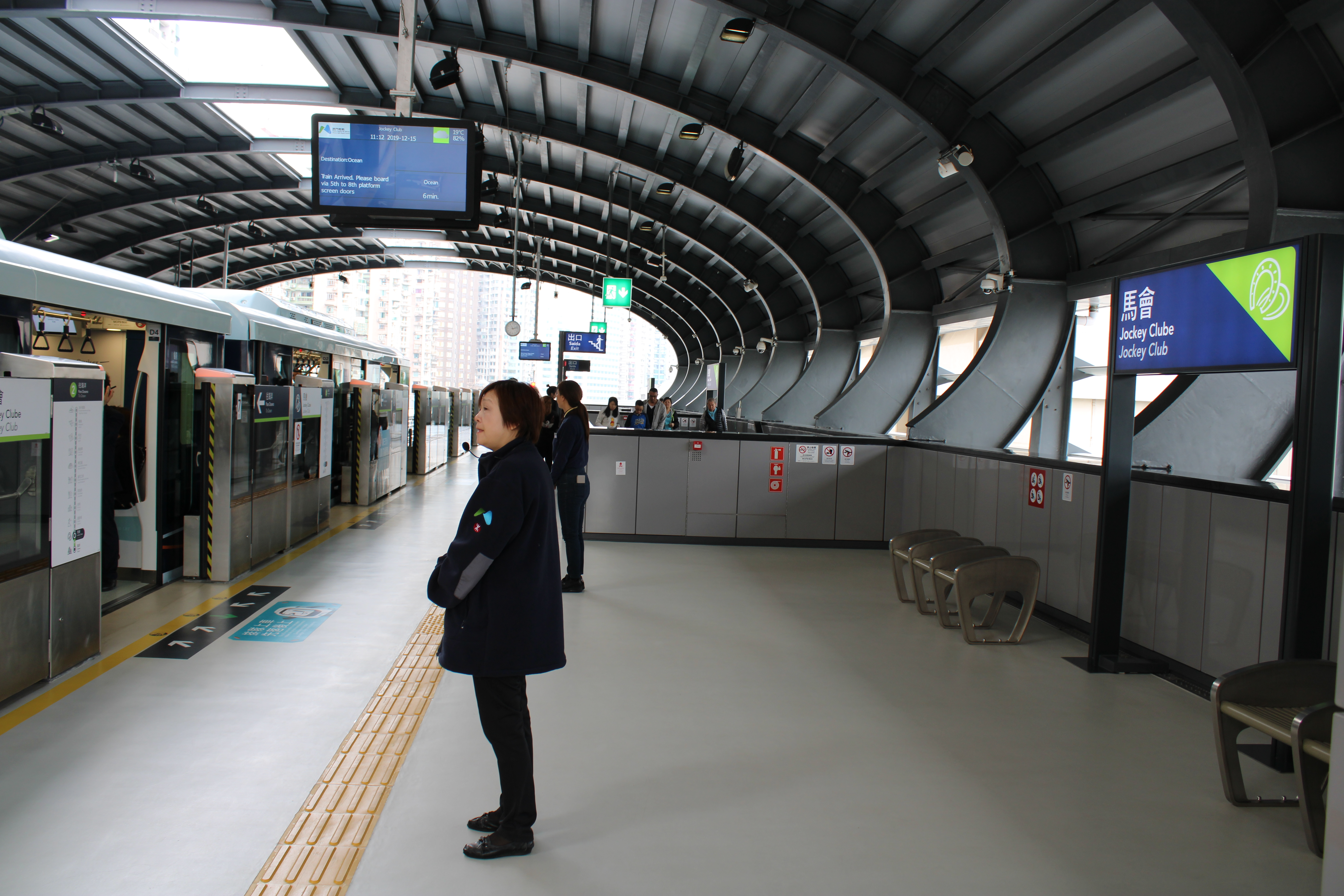
- Platform 2 of Jockey Club station, December 2019

General information
- Location: Estrada Governador Albano de Oliveira; Freguesia de Nossa Senhora do Carmo; Macau
- Coordinates: 22.157081°N 113.547242°E
- Operated by: Macao Light Rapid Transit Corporation, Limited
- Line(s): Taipa
- Platforms: 2 side platforms

Construction
- Structure type: Elevated

Other information
- Station code: ST14

History
- Opened: 10 December 2019

Services
Preceding station	Macau Light Rapid Transit	Following station
Ocean towards Barra	Taipa line	Stadium towards Taipa Ferry Terminal
Route map
Location

Jockey Club station (Chinese: 馬會站; Portuguese: Estação Jockey Clube) is a station on Taipa line of the Macau Light Rapid Transit, located within two-minute walking distance of Macau Jockey Club.

== History ==
Jockey Club station was originally named "賽馬會站" in Chinese, and was planned to be around 100 metres west of the present location, until the proposal was updated in 2009. Building work of this and other three stations in Taipa began in 2012, and later that year Estrada Gov. A. Oliveria Public Transport Interchange also started construction. Jocky Club station work was completed in 2016, but the opening was delayed due to ongoing work at Taipa line train depot.

The station opened on 10 December 2019 along with the Taipa line, and the nearby public transport interchange opened 18 days later.

== Station layout ==
Two side platforms are on the second floor, and ticket hall is located on the first floor. Passengers may exit for public transport interchange on the first floor or for bus stops on the ground floor.

F2	Side platform, doors will open on the left
F2	Platform 1	Taipa towards Taipa Ferry Terminal (Stadium)	arrow for R
F2	Platform 2	Taipa towards Barra (Ocean)
F2	Side platform, doors will open on the left
F1	Tickets Level		Service counter, ticket machine and toilet, to Estrada Gov. A. Olivera Public Transport Interchange
G	Exits and entrances		Bus interchange

Number	Indicated Direction	Image	Nearby Destinations
A	Taipa Pequena		Four-faced Buddha Shrine; Taipa Pequena; Estrada Gov. A. Olivera Public Transport Interchange
B	Jockey Club		Macau Jockey Club; The Macau Roosevelt
