= Pai Kok station =

Macau Light Rapid Transit station

Pai Kok 排角
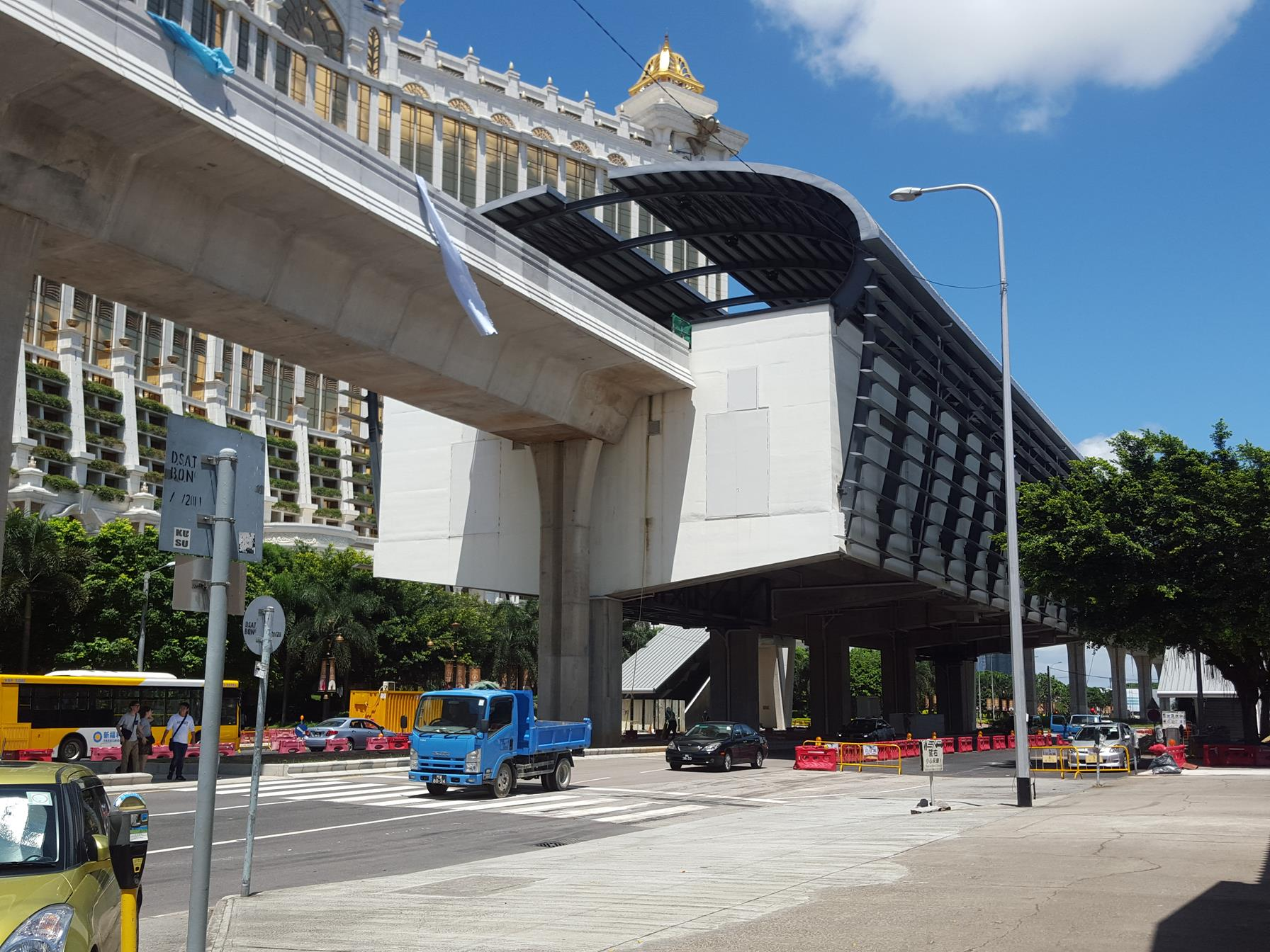

General information
- Location: Estrada da Baía de Nossa Senhora da Esperança, Freguesia de Nossa Senhora do Carmo, Macau
- Coordinates: 22°09′03″N 113°33′16″E
- Operated by: Macao Light Rapid Transit Corporation, Limited
- Line: Taipa
- Platforms: 2 side platforms

Construction
- Structure type: Elevated

Other information
- Station code: ST16

History
- Opened: 10 December 2019

Services
Preceding station	Macau Light Rapid Transit	Following station
Stadium towards Barra	Taipa line	Cotai West towards Taipa Ferry Terminal
Route map
Location

Pai Kok station (Chinese: 排角站; Portuguese: Estação de Pai Kok) is a station on the Taipa line of the Macau Light Rapid Transit in Taipa, Macau. It was opened on 10 December 2019. The station is located near the Venetian Macau and Galaxy Macau, as well as landmarks in Vila da Taipa (the old town of Taipa) such as Rua do Cunha and Taipa Houses–Museum.

== History ==
During planning, this station was originally named Villa da Taipa (Chinese: 舊城區). The name was changed to Pai Kok in 2009.

The construction of the station began in 2014.

== Station layout ==
=== Station floors ===
2/F	Side platform; doors open on the left
2/F	Platform 1		Taipa to Taipa Ferry Terminal (Cotai West)	arrow for R
2/F	Platform 2	arrow for L	Taipa to Barra (Stadium)
2/F	Side platform; doors open on the left
1/F	Tickets Level		Service counter, ticket machine and toilet
Ground Floor			Exits and entrances

=== Entrances/Exits ===
Number	Indicated Direction	Image	Nearby Destinations
A	Taipa Old Town		Escola Luso-Chinesa da Taipa; Macao Sam Yuk Middle School; Vila da Taipa; Tin Hau Temple; Museum of Taipa and Coloane History; Pak Tai Temple; Kiang Wu Hospital Taipa Medical Centre; Sheng Kung Hui Taipa Youth and Family Integrated Service Centre; Olympic Sports Centre - Aquatic Centre; Macau Olympic Sports Center - Stadium
B	Hotels & Resorts		Galaxy Macau; Galaxy Hotel; Hotel Okura Macau; Banyan Tree Macau
