= East Asian Games station =

Macau Light Rapid Transit station

Jogos da Ásia Oriental 東亞運
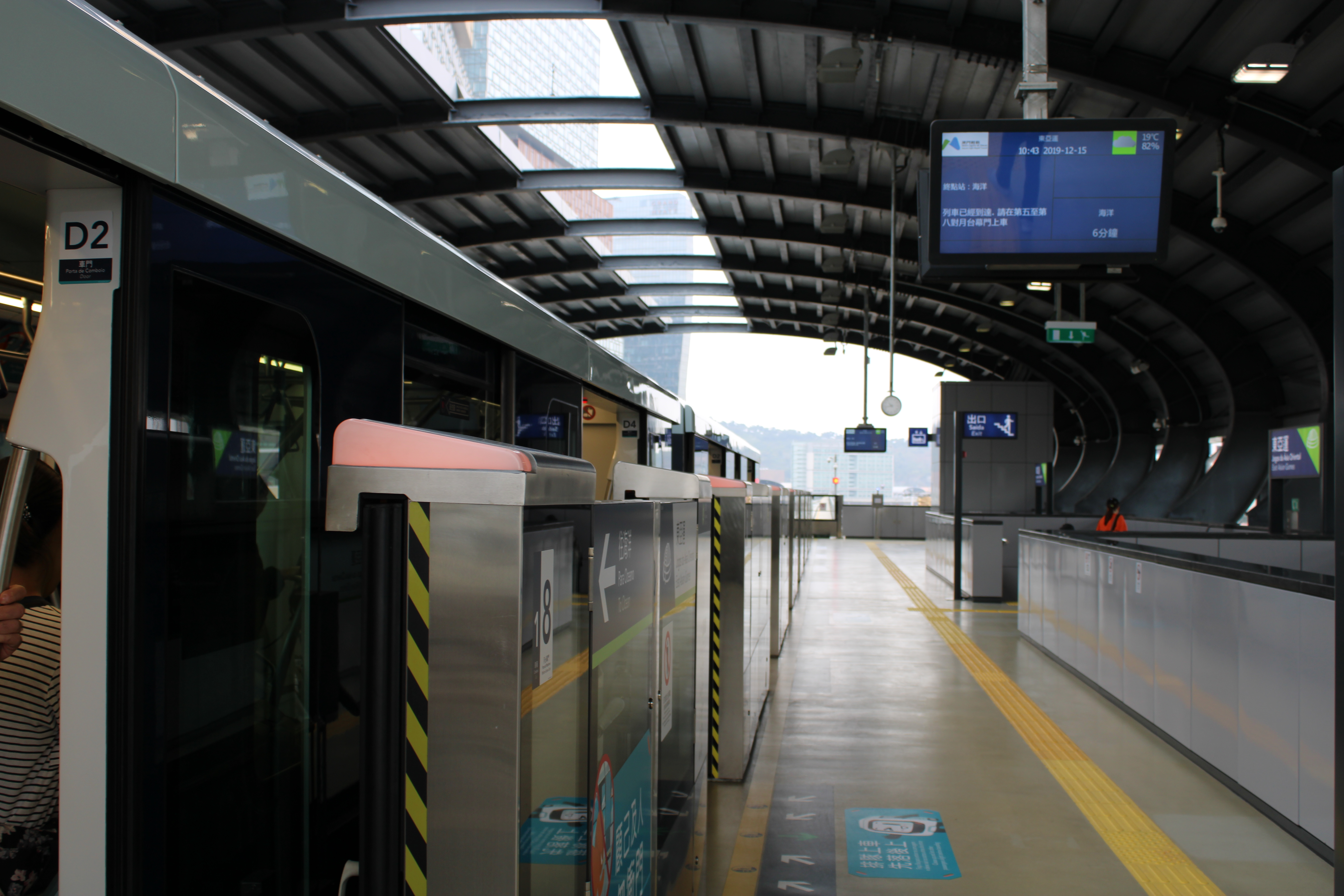
- Platform 2 of East Asian Games station, December 2019

General information
- Location: Avenida da Nave Desportiva; Cotai; Macau
- Coordinates: 22.142297°N 113.568656°E
- Operated by: MTR (Macau)
- Line(s): Taipa
- Platforms: 2 side platforms

Construction
- Structure type: Elevated

Other information
- Station code: ST19

History
- Opened: 10 December 2019

Services
Preceding station	Macau Light Rapid Transit	Following station
Union Hospital towards Barra	Taipa line	Cotai East towards Taipa Ferry Terminal
Route map
Location

East Asian Games station (Chinese: 東亞運站; Portuguese: Estação dos Jogos da Ásia Oriental) is a station on Taipa line of the Macau Light Rapid Transit, named after the nearby East Asian Games Dome.

== History ==
In the original plan this station is named Macau Dome station (澳門蛋站; Estação dos Nave de Macau), the unofficial name of the dome. Building work of this and other three stations in Cotai began in 2012. Although completed in 2015, the opening of the station was delayed due to ongoing work at Taipa line train depot.

The station opened on 10 December 2019 along with the Taipa line.

== Station layout ==
Two side platforms are on the second floor, and ticket hall is located on the first floor.

- Exit A: MGM Cotai
- Exit B: Macau East Asian Games Dome
