= Cotai West station =

Macau Light Rapid Transit station

Cotai Oeste 路氹西
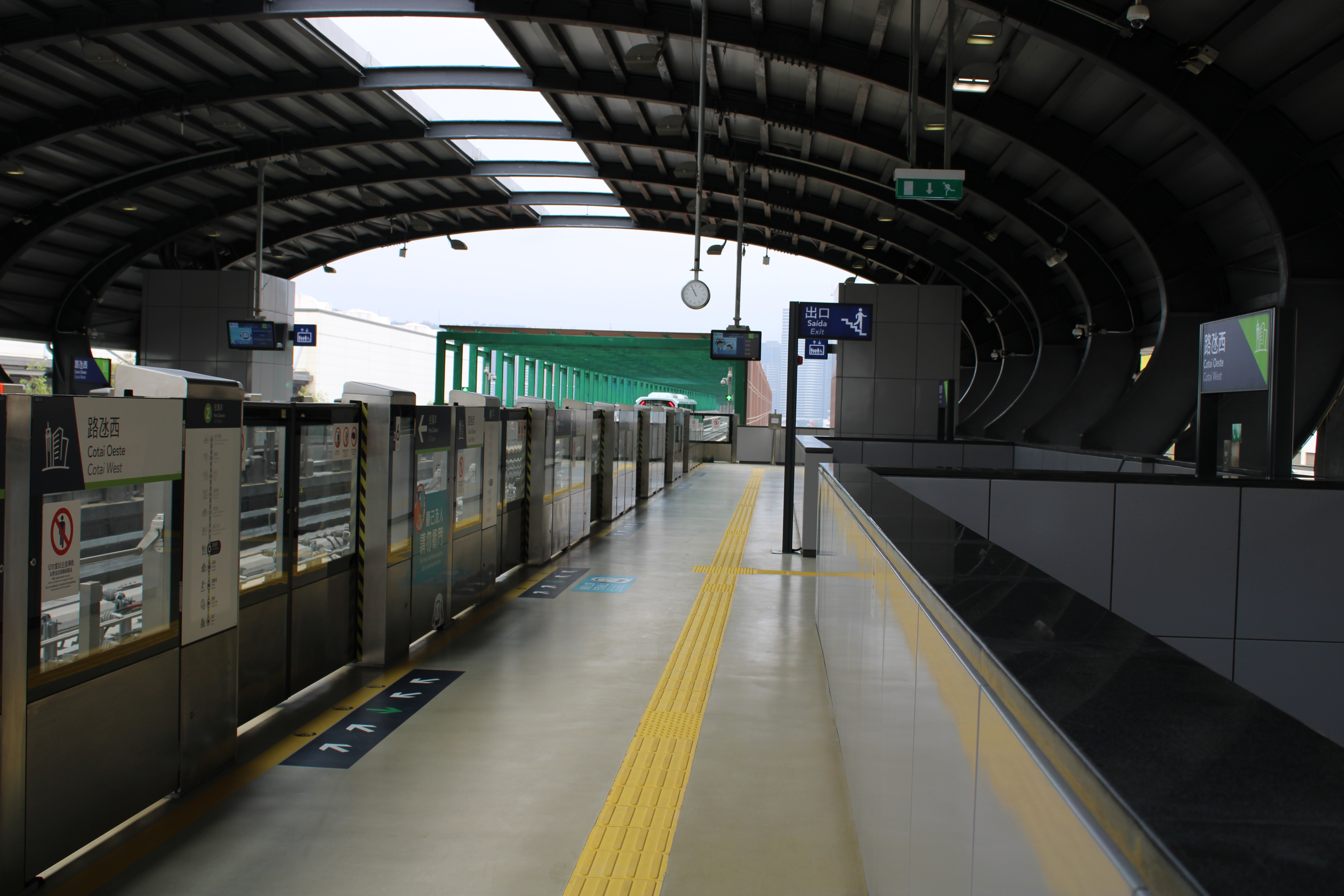
- Platform 2 of Cotai West station, December 2019

General information
- Location: Avenida Cidade Nova; Cotai; Macau
- Coordinates: 22.145039°N 113.55785°E
- Operator: Macao Light Rapid Transit Corporation, Limited
- Line: Taipa
- Platforms: 2 side platforms

Construction
- Structure type: Elevated

Other information
- Station code: ST17

History
- Opened: 10 December 2019

Services
| Preceding station | Macau Light Rapid Transit | Following station |
|---|---|---|
| Pai Kok towards Barra | Taipa line | Lotus towards Taipa Ferry Terminal |
Route map
Location

Cotai West station (Chinese: 路氹西站; Portuguese: Estação Cotai Oeste) is a station on Taipa line of the Macau Light Rapid Transit, mainly serving tourists and staff due to its proximity to multiple casino resorts including Parisian Macao, Venetian Macao, and Galaxy Macau.

== History ==
In the original plan this station is named West Zone of Cotai station (Chinese: 路氹城西站; Portuguese: Estação Zona Oeste do Cotai). Building work of this and other three stations in Cotai began in 2012. Although completed in 2015, the opening of the station was delayed due to ongoing work at Taipa line train depot.

The station opened on 10 December 2019 along with the Taipa line.

== Station layout ==
Two side platforms are on the second floor, and ticket hall is located on the first floor.

=== Station floors ===
| 2/F | Side platform; doors open on the left |
| 2/F | Platform Floor | | 1 Taipa Line to Taipa Ferry Terminal (Lotus) | arrow for R |
| 2/F | Platform Floor | arrow for L | 2 Taipa Line to Barra (Pai Kok) |
| 2/F | Side platform; doors open on the left |
| 1/F | Tickets Level | | Service counter, ticket machine and toilet |
| Ground Floor | | | Exits and entrances |

=== Entrances/Exits ===
| Number | Indicated Direction | Image | Nearby Destinations |
|---|---|---|---|
| A | The Venetian | | The Venetian Macau Resort Hotel; Four Seasons Macao; The Parisian Macau; Cotai Expo Entrance |
| B | Galaxy Macau | | Cotai Ecological Conservation Zone; Galaxy Macau; The Ritz-Carlton Macau; JW Marriott Macau; Galaxy International Convention Center; Andaz Macau; Galaxy Arena |
