= Stadium station (Macau Light Rapid Transit) =

Macau Light Rapid Transit station

Estádio 運動場
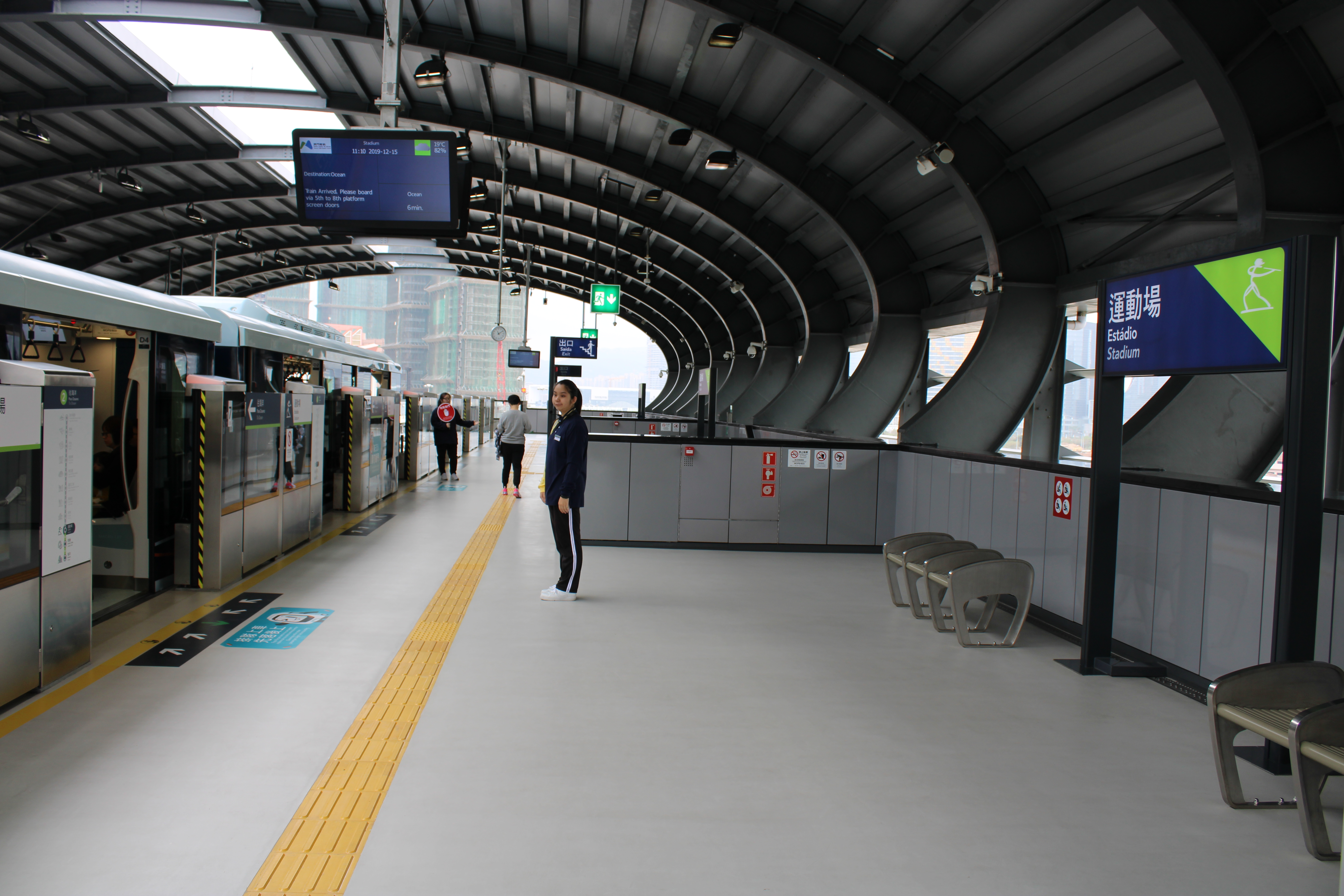
- Platform 2 of Stadium station, December 2019

General information
- Location: Avenida do Estádio; Freguesia de Nossa Senhora do Carmo; Macau
- Coordinates: 22.154319°N 113.551894°E
- Operated by: Macao Light Rapid Transit Corporation, Limited
- Line(s): Taipa
- Platforms: 2 side platforms

Construction
- Structure type: Elevated

Other information
- Station code: ST15

History
- Opened: 10 December 2019

Services
| Preceding station | Macau Light Rapid Transit | Following station |
|---|---|---|
| Jockey Club towards Barra | Taipa line | Pai Kok towards Taipa Ferry Terminal |
Route map

Stadium station (Chinese: 運動場站; Portuguese: Estação do Estádio) is a station on Taipa line of the Macau Light Rapid Transit, near Olympic Sports Center complex.

== History ==
In the original plan this station is named Macau Stadium station (Chinese: 澳門運動場站; Portuguese: Estação do Estádio de Macau) and located near Grandview Hotel, until the proposal was updated in 2009. Building work of this and other three stations in Taipa began in 2012. Although completed in 2016, the opening of the station was delayed due to ongoing work at Taipa line train depot.

The station opened on 10 December 2019 along with the Taipa line.

== Station layout ==
| 2/F | Side platform; doors open on the left |
| 2/F | Platform Floor | | 1 Taipa Line to Taipa Ferry Terminal (Pai Kok) | arrow for R |
| 2/F | Platform Floor | arrow for L | 2 Taipa Line to Barra (Jockey Club) |
| 2/F | Side platform; doors open on the left |
| 1/F | Tickets Level | | Service counter, ticket machine and toilet |
| Ground Floor | | | Exits and entrances |

== Entrances/Exits ==
Stadium station's concourse could be accessed through the elevated walkway along the Avenida de Guimarães and Rotunda do Estádio.

| Number | Indicated Direction | Image | Nearby Destinations |
|---|---|---|---|
| A | Stadium | | Macao Sam Yuk Middle School; Galaxy Macau; Macau Olympic Sports Center; Macau Olympic Sports Center - Olympic Swimming Pool; Municipal Affairs Bureau Islands District Public Services Centre |
| B | Jockey Club | | Jockey Club; Four-faced Buddha Shrine; Grandview Hotel Macau; Grand Dragon Hotel |

== Usage ==
The Avenida de Guimarães na Taipa pedestrian bridge connects the station and Taipa city centre. The station also serves as the connection to casino resort Galaxy Macau and Macau Olympic Sports Centre, including the Aquatic Centre and the stadium. However, the station was temporarily closed after South Korean band Seventeen held the concert at the stadium in January 2024, stirring criticism of abandoning crowd control duties.
