= Ocean station (Macau Light Rapid Transit) =

Light rail station in Macau

Coordinates: 22.157825°N 113.5413°E

Ocean 海洋
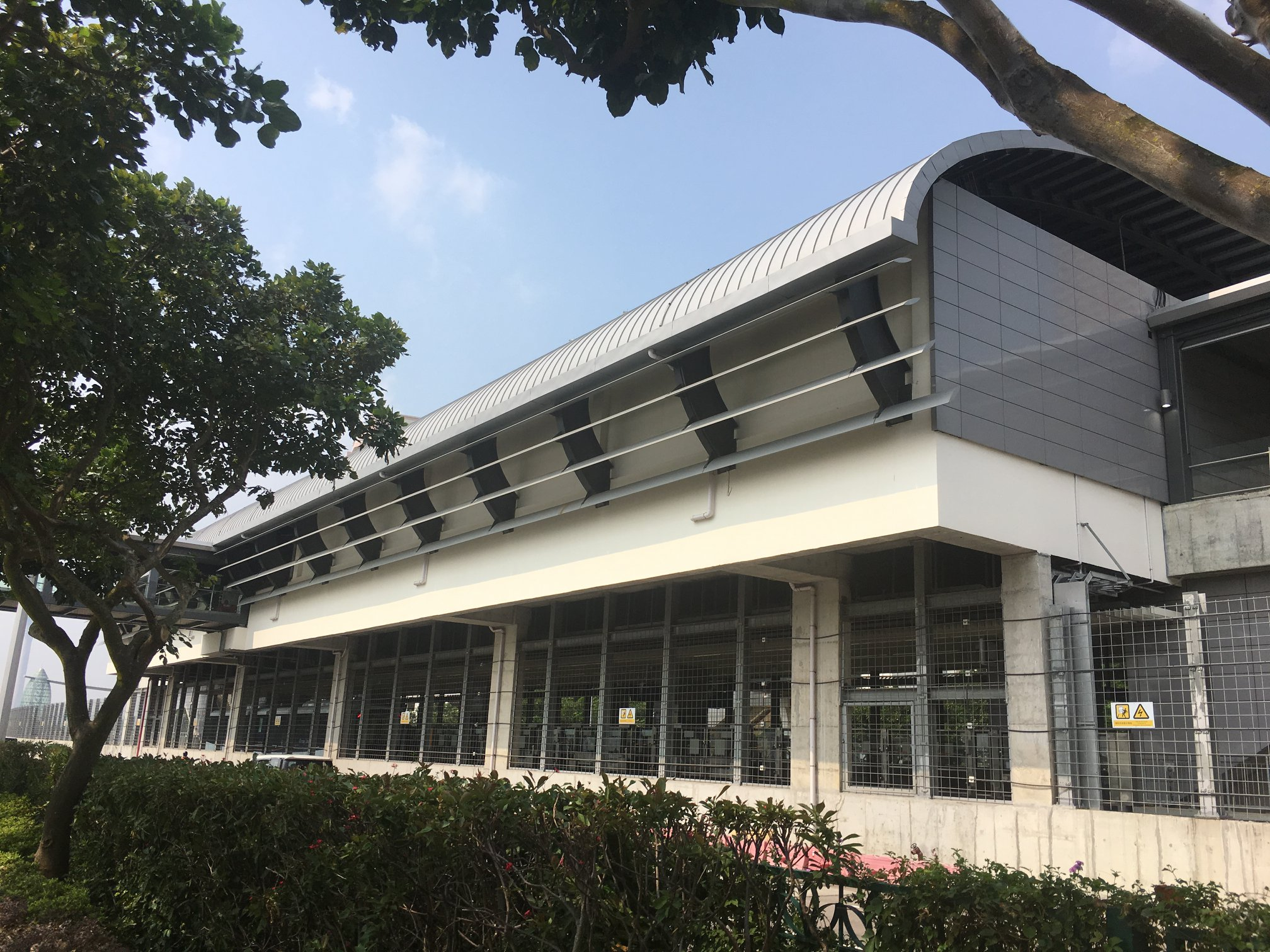

General information
- Location: Avenida dos Jogos da Ásia Oriental, Freguesia de Nossa Senhora do Carmo, Macau
- Operated by: Macao Light Rapid Transit Corporation, Limited
- Line(s): Taipa
- Platforms: 1 island platform

Construction
- Structure type: Elevated

Other information
- Station code: ST13

History
- Opened: 10 December 2019
- Previous names: Sai Van Bridge station

Services
Preceding station	Macau Light Rapid Transit	Following station
Barra Terminus	Taipa line	Jockey Club towards Taipa Ferry Terminal
Route map
Location

Ocean station (Chinese: 海洋站; Portuguese: Estação do Oceano) is a station on the Taipa line of the Macau Light Rapid Transit in Taipa, Macau. It is adjacent to the namesake Ocean Gardens, a large-scale residential development at the northwestern corner of Taipa island, as well as the southern approach of Sai Van Bridge.

It was opened on 10 December 2019 as the western terminus of the Taipa line. An extension of the line to Barra was completed on 8 December 2023. Ocean is the last stop on Taipa before trains proceed to the Macau Peninsula.

== History ==
During the planning stage, the station was once named Ponte de Sai Van after the Sai Van Bridge. It was subsequently renamed Ocean after the high-density residential development Ocean Gardens (Portuguese: Jardins do Oceano) to the northeast of the station.

Construction of the station began in 2014. At Ocean station, topping out was completed in early 2016, yet the line did not become operational for another 3 years due to complications with the LRT depot construction works.

On 7 November 2017, the first two Ocean Cruiser LRT carriages were transported to Ocean station, where they then underwent a series of on-site equipment tests.

The Macau Light Rapid Transit system began operations on 10 December 2019. Ocean station was the western terminus of Taipa line, the only operational line of the system, before the line’s extension to Barra in 2023.

== Layout ==
Ocean station is constructed within the central reservation of Avenida dos Jogos da Ásia Oriental in northwest Taipa.

Among all stations on the Taipa line, Ocean station is unique for having at-grade platforms, and also for boasting an island platform instead of side platforms. To the south of the station, arriving trains descend from a viaduct and enter Platform 2. After dropping off passengers there, trains will proceed to a crossover track immediately to the north of the station and switch direction, picking up passengers on Platform 1 afterwards.

F1	Ticketing level	Service counter, ticket machine, toilet, exits
G	Platform 1	Taipa towards Taipa Ferry Terminal (Jockey Club)	arrow for R
G	Island platform, doors open on the right
G	Platform 2	Taipa towards Barra (terminus)

== Entrances/Exits ==
Ocean station's concourse could be accessed through footbridges connecting to both sides of Avenida dos Jogos da Ásia Oriental.

Number	Indicated Direction	Image	Nearby Destinations
A	Ocean Gardens (Note: Officially misspelt as "Ocean Garden")		Sport Medicine Centre; Taipa Ocean Gardens Health Centre (Note: Officially misspelt as "Taipa Ocean Garden Health Centre"); The Scout Association of Macau; Monument Garden
B	Leisure Area		Leisure Area on Taipa Waterfront (Note: Officially written as "Leisure Area")

== Services ==
Barra Station opened on December 8, 2023. Trains will run directly to it via Sai Van Bridge. This station is the last stop on Taipa before trains proceed to the Macau Peninsula.
