= Union Hospital station =

Railway station in Macau

Union Hospital 協和醫院
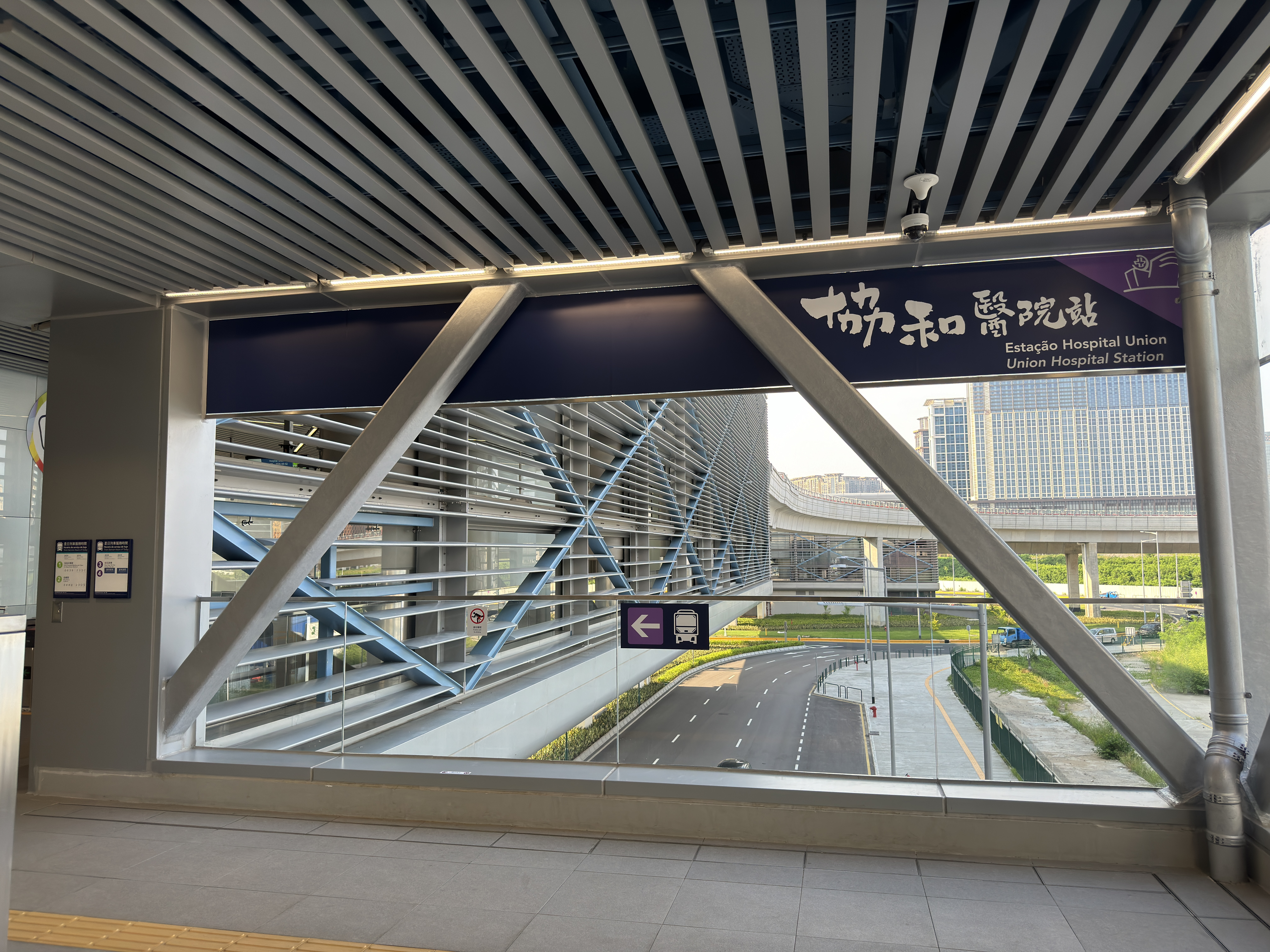
- Entrance and exit signs of Union Hospital station

General information
- Location: Estrada do Istmo, Cotai, Macau
- Line: TaipaSeac Pai Van
- Platforms: 2 side platforms, 2 island platforms

Construction
- Structure type: Elevated

Other information
- Station code: ST18A

History
- Opened: Taipa line: 1 September 2024; Seac Pai Van line: 1 November 2024
- Former names: Island Hospital

Services
Preceding station	Macau Light Rapid Transit	Following station
Lotus towards Barra	Taipa line	East Asian Games towards Taipa Ferry Terminal
Terminus	Seac Pai Van line	Seac Pai Van Terminus
Route map
Location

Union Hospital station (Chinese: 協和醫院站, Portuguese: Estação Hospital Union) is the interchange station for the Taipa Line and the Seac Pai Van line of the Macau LRT, and also the terminal station for the Seac Pai Van line. It is located between the Rotunda Flor de Lótus in Cotai and Estrada do Istmo, connecting to the Macau Union Hospital. This station is an elevated station, with pathways for transferring between the Taipa Line and the Seac Pai Van line.

== Station layout ==
=== Station lobby ===
The station is equipped with a customer service center, self-service ticket vending machines, entrance gates, ticketing information, street maps, exit instructions, etc., and is located on the Seac Pai Van line and shared with the Taipa line.

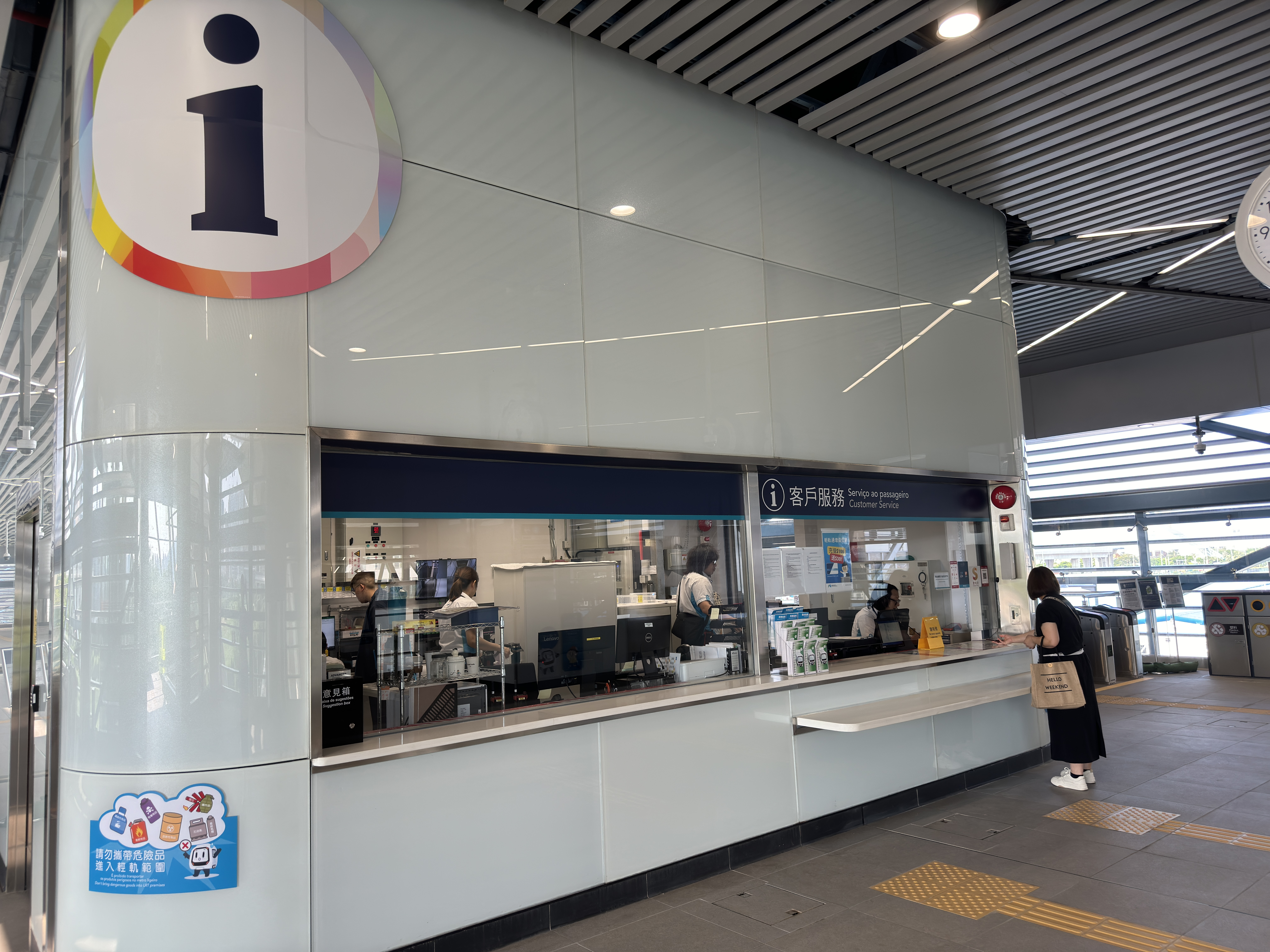
Customer Service Center

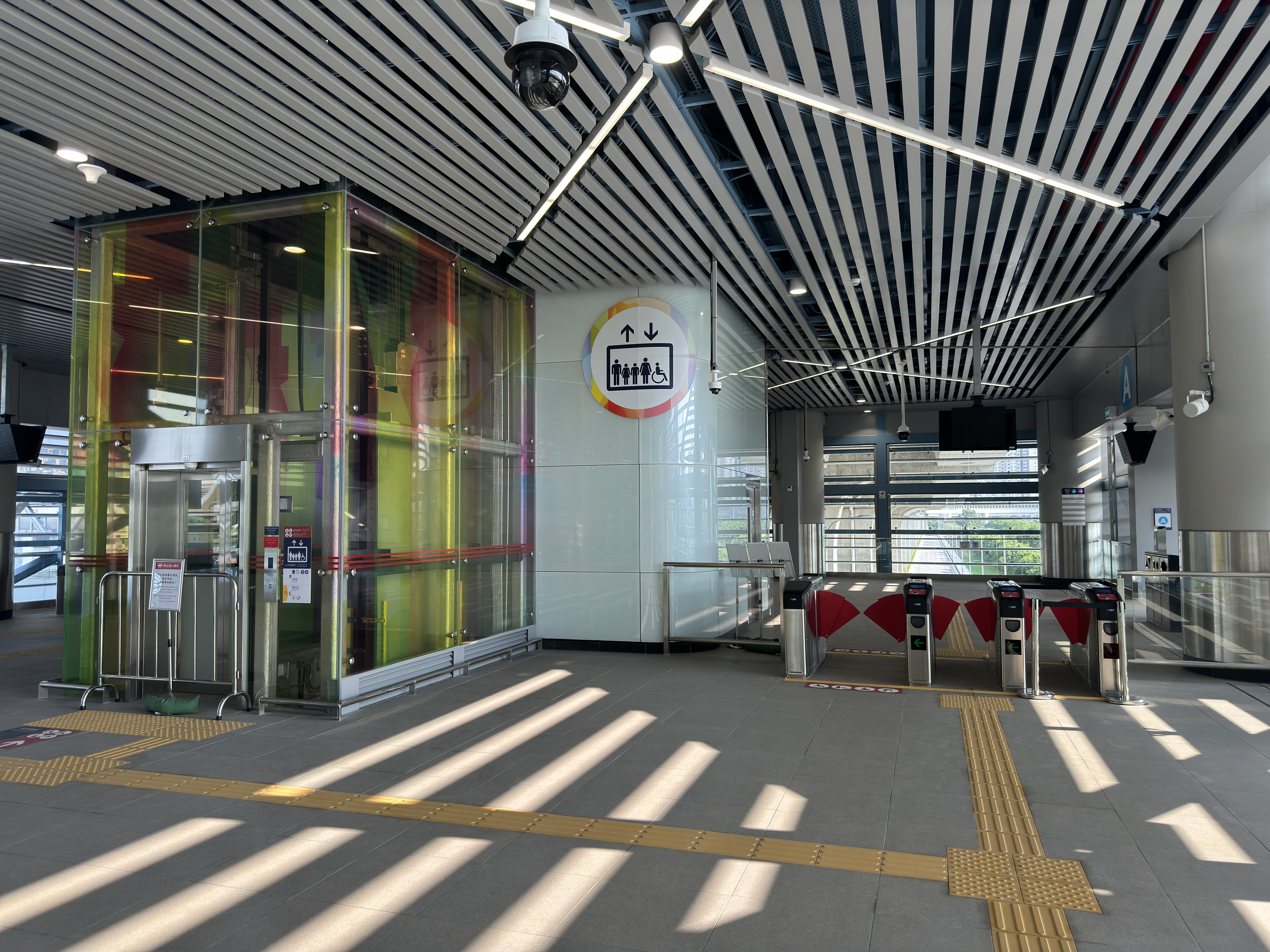
An elevator connecting the station lobby to the platform of the Seac Pai Van line

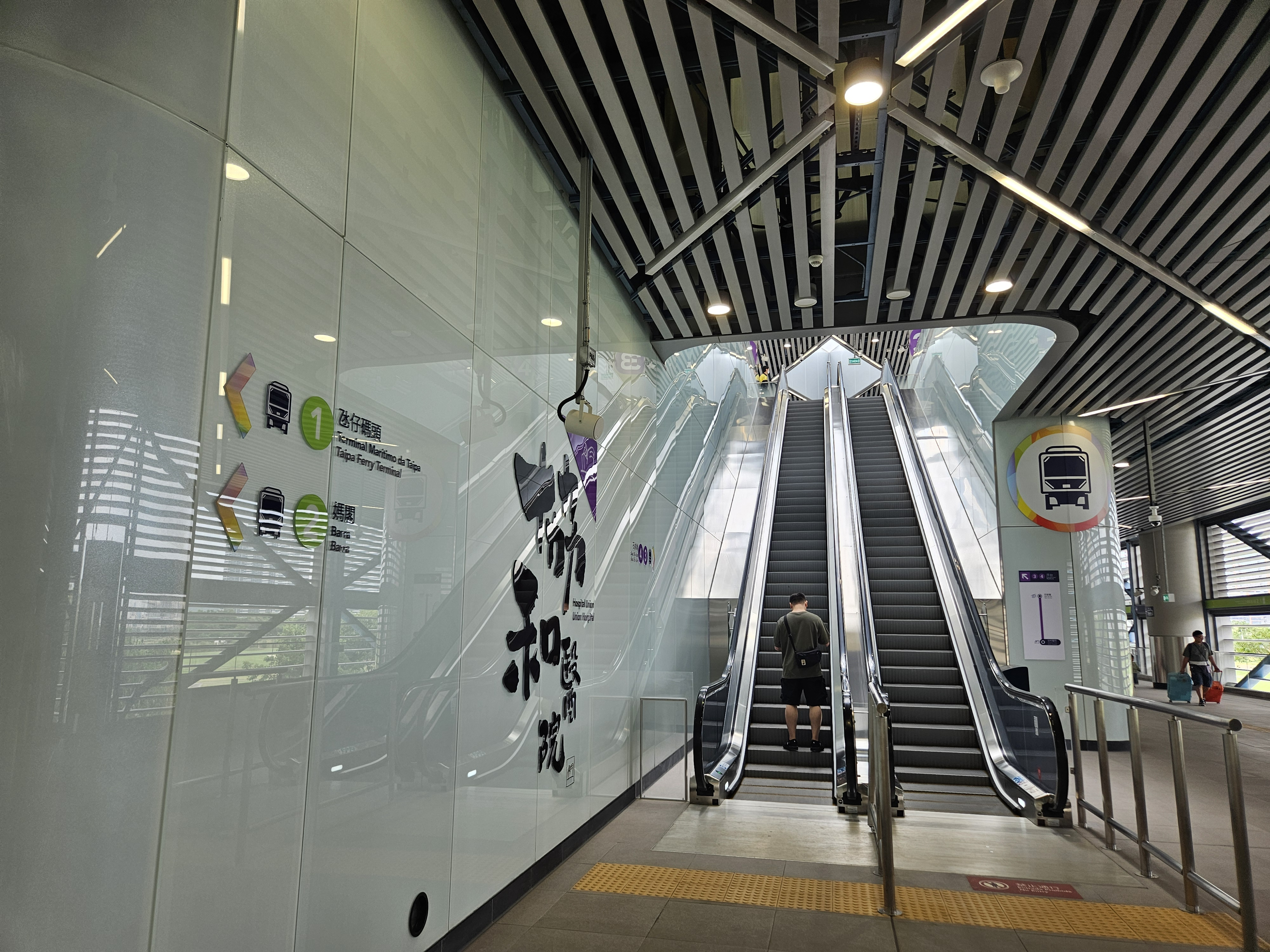
An escalator connecting the station lobby to the platform of the Seac Pai Van line

=== Platforms and transfer ===
Union Hospital Station has four platforms, all of which are equipped with platform gates. The Taipa Line platform is a side platform, while the platform of the Seac Pai Van line is an island platform, located in the middle of the Cotai Connecting Highway, south of the Taipa Line station. Platform 3 is a platform used by both lines, while platform 4 is a backup platform for special occasions.

The original plan and design of this station was to serve as one of the independent stations of the Seac Pai Van line, and the original plan and design of Lianhua Station was to become an interchange station for the "three-line intersection" between the Taipa Line, the Hengqin Line and the Seac Pai Van line. In 2020, the revised plan canceled the original design and instead built this station near Lianhua Station on the Taipa Line, so that the Seac Pai Van line would terminate at this station and intersect with the Taipa Line. This results in a long distance between transfer channels.

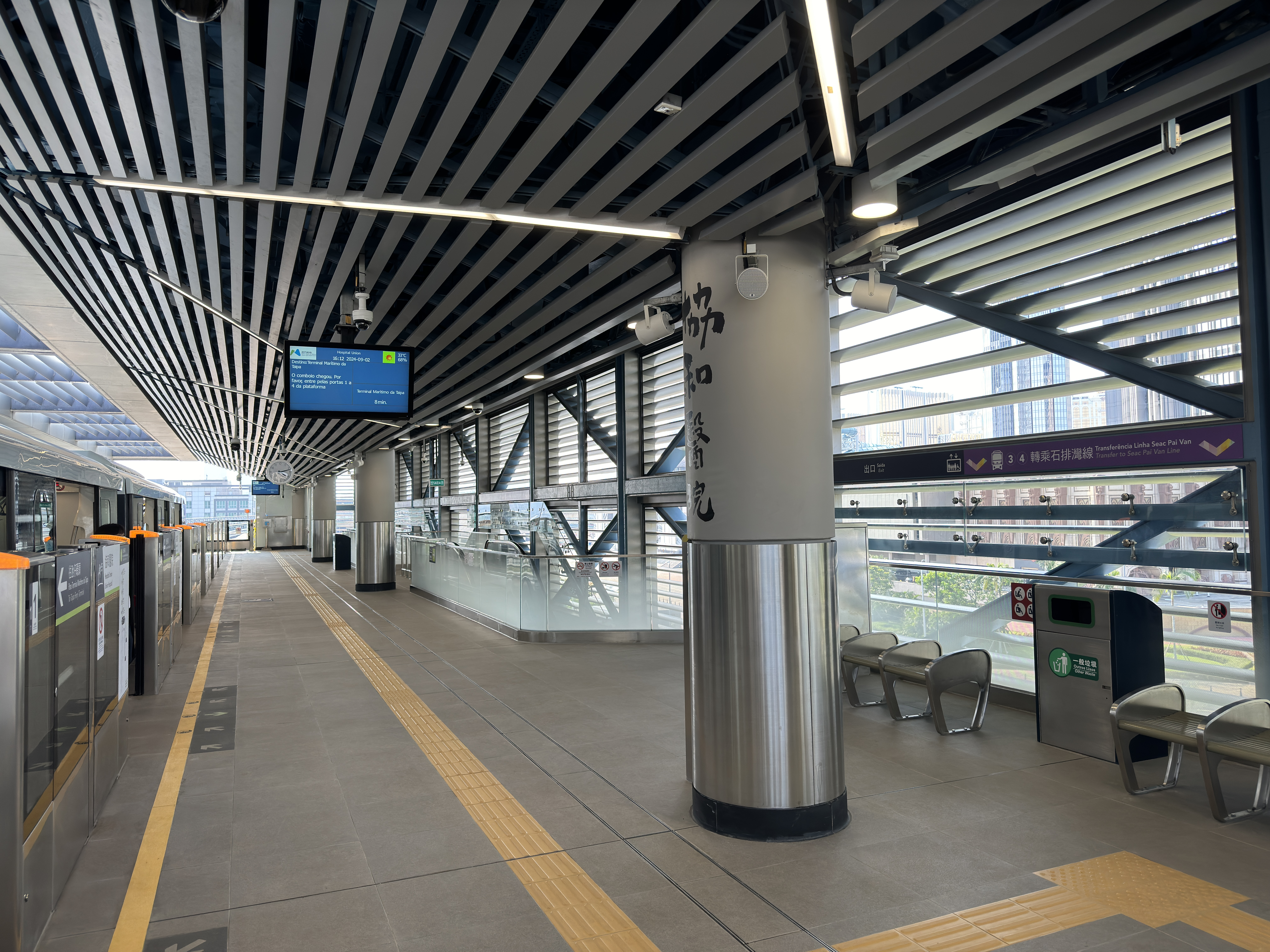
Platform 1 - to Taipa Ferry Terminal

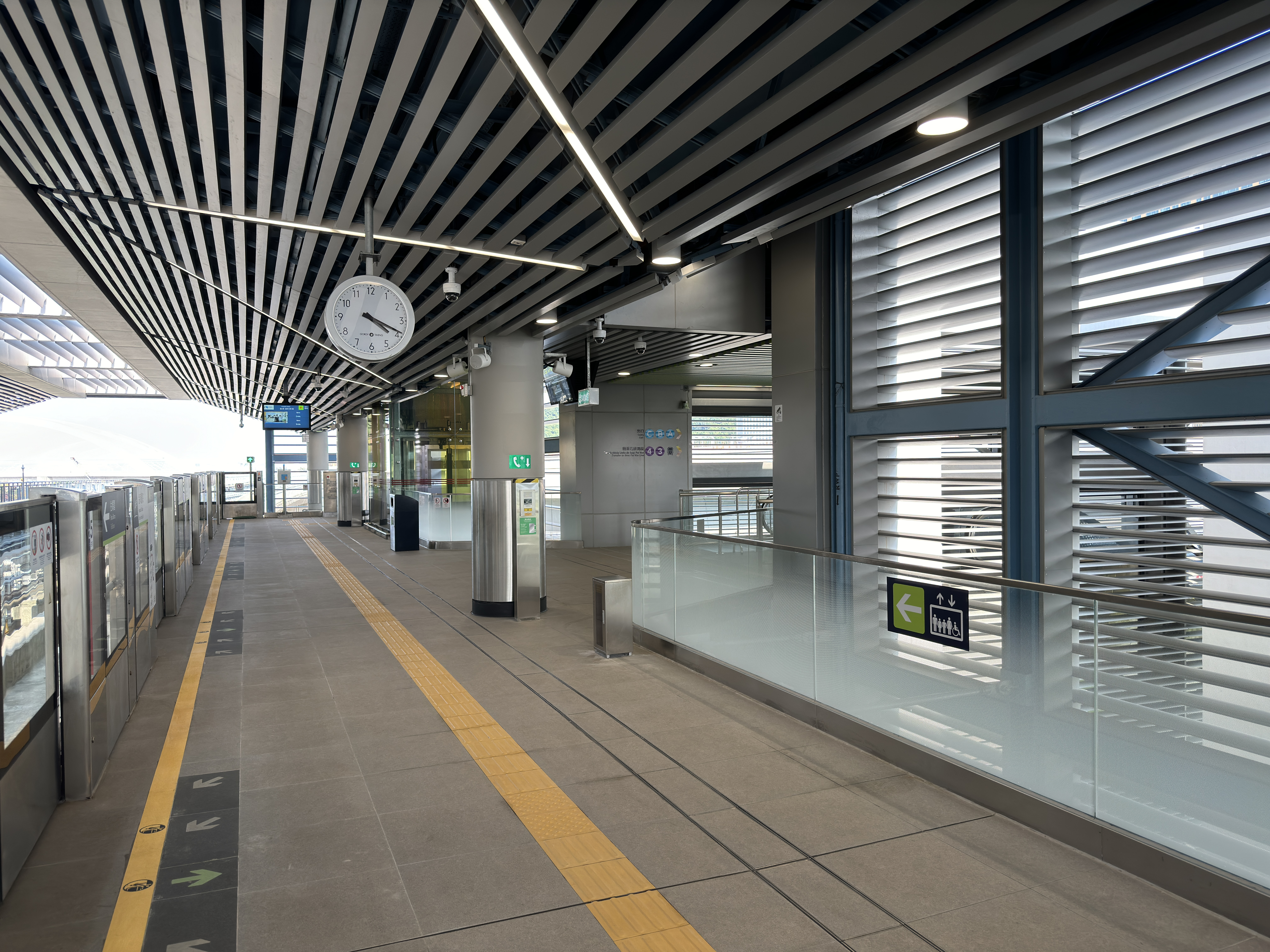
Platform 2 - to A-Ma

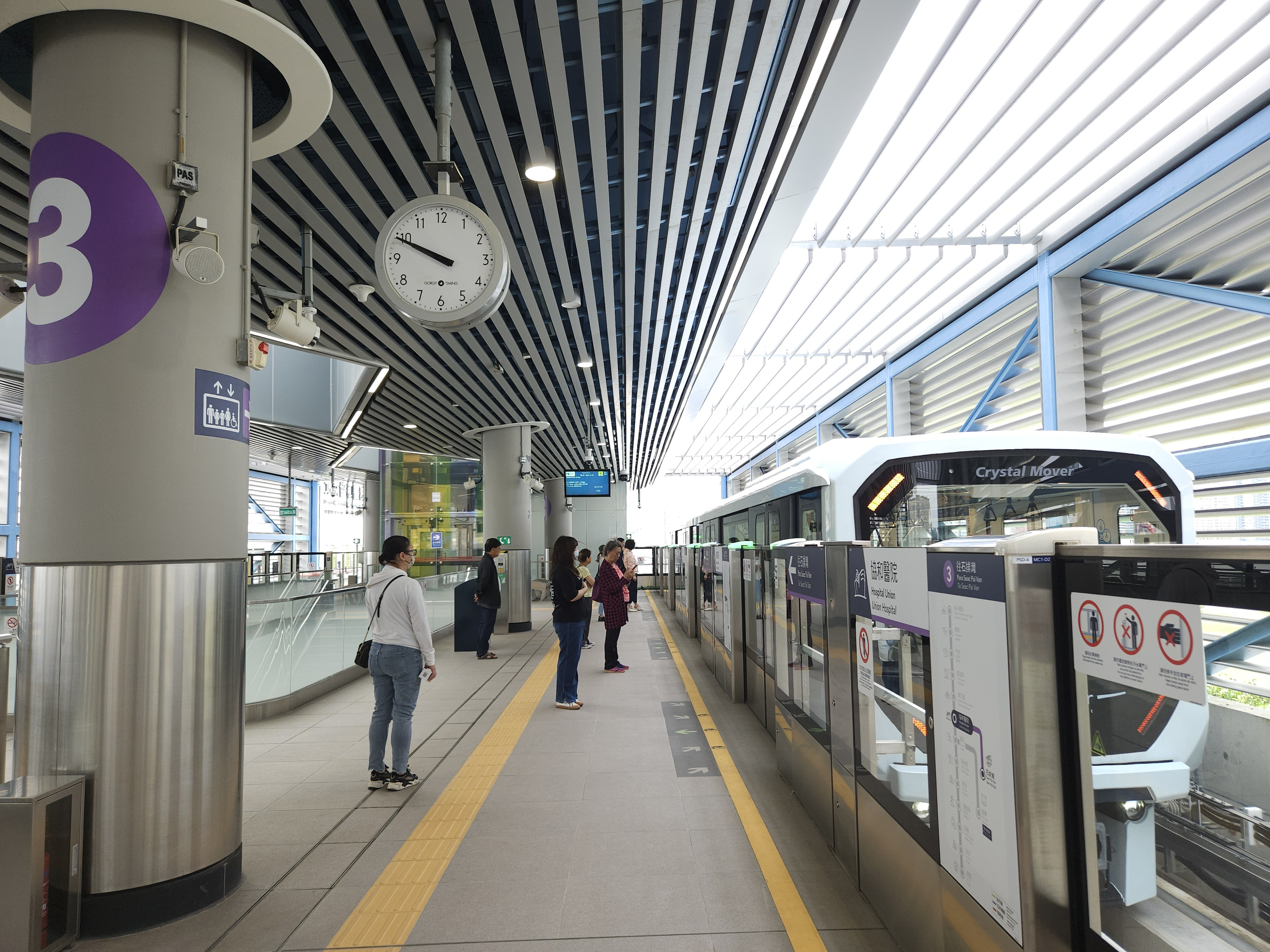
Platform 3 - to Shek Pai Wan

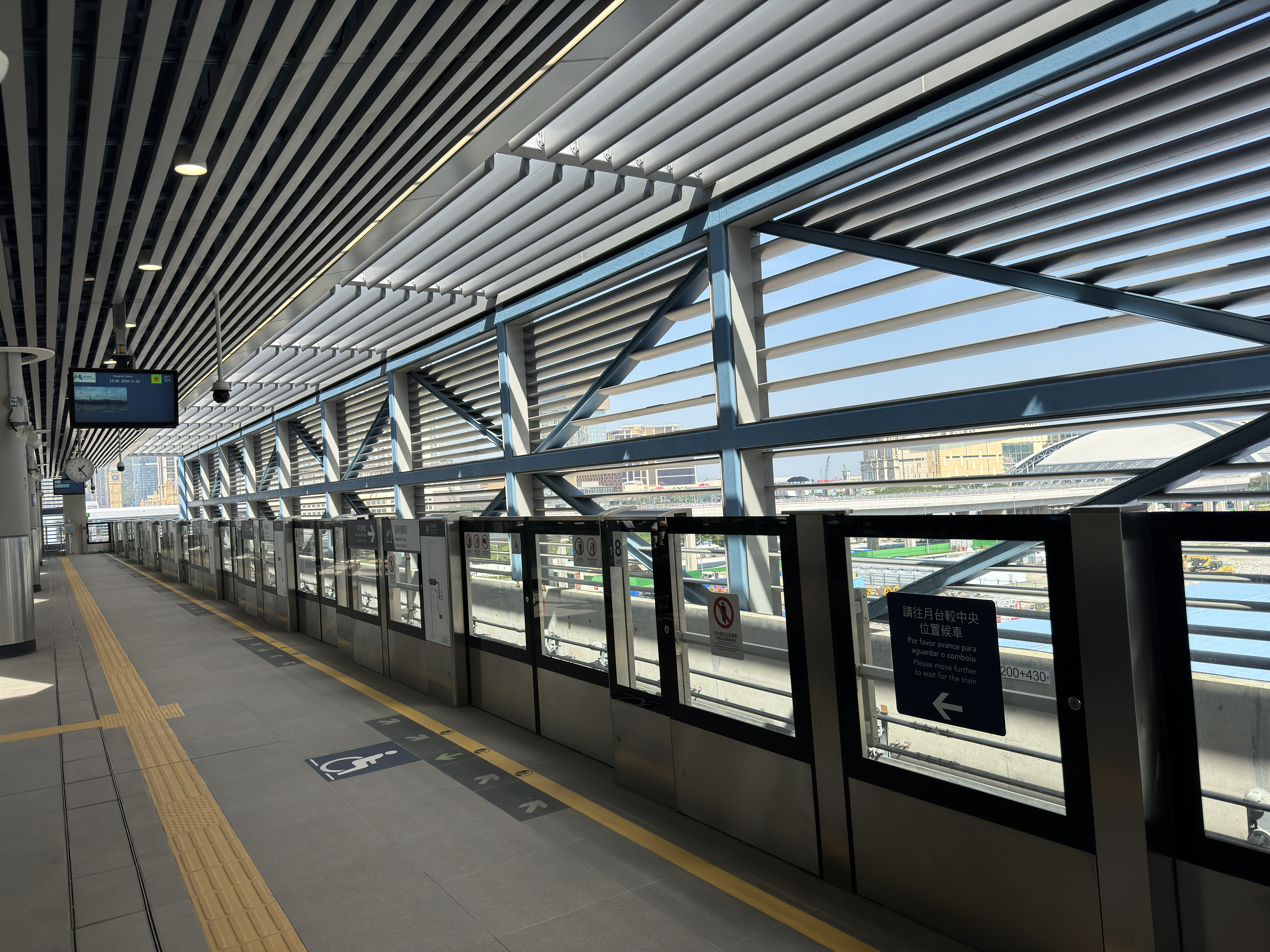
Platform 4 - to Shek Pai Wan

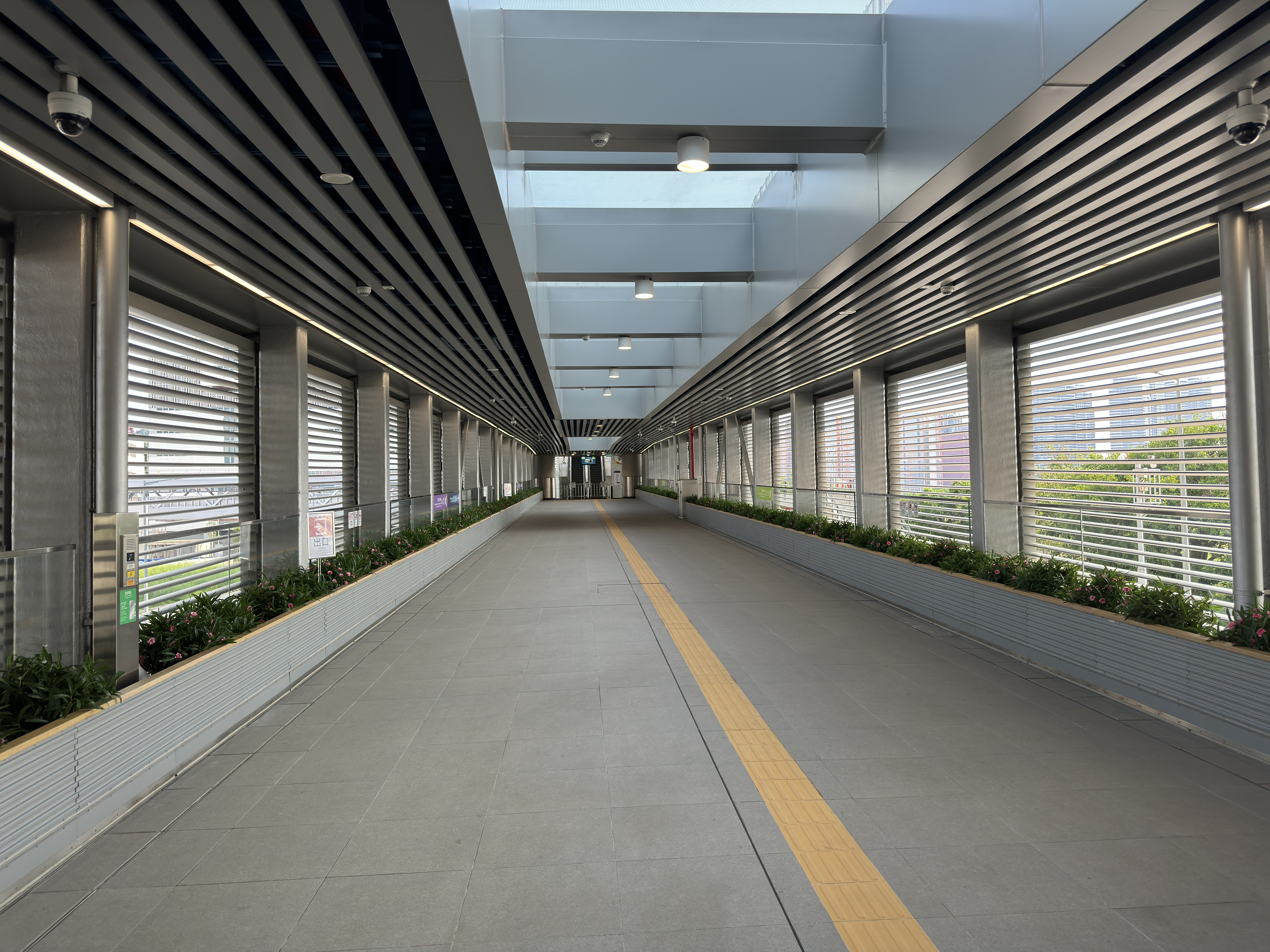
Inside the transfer channel in the paid area

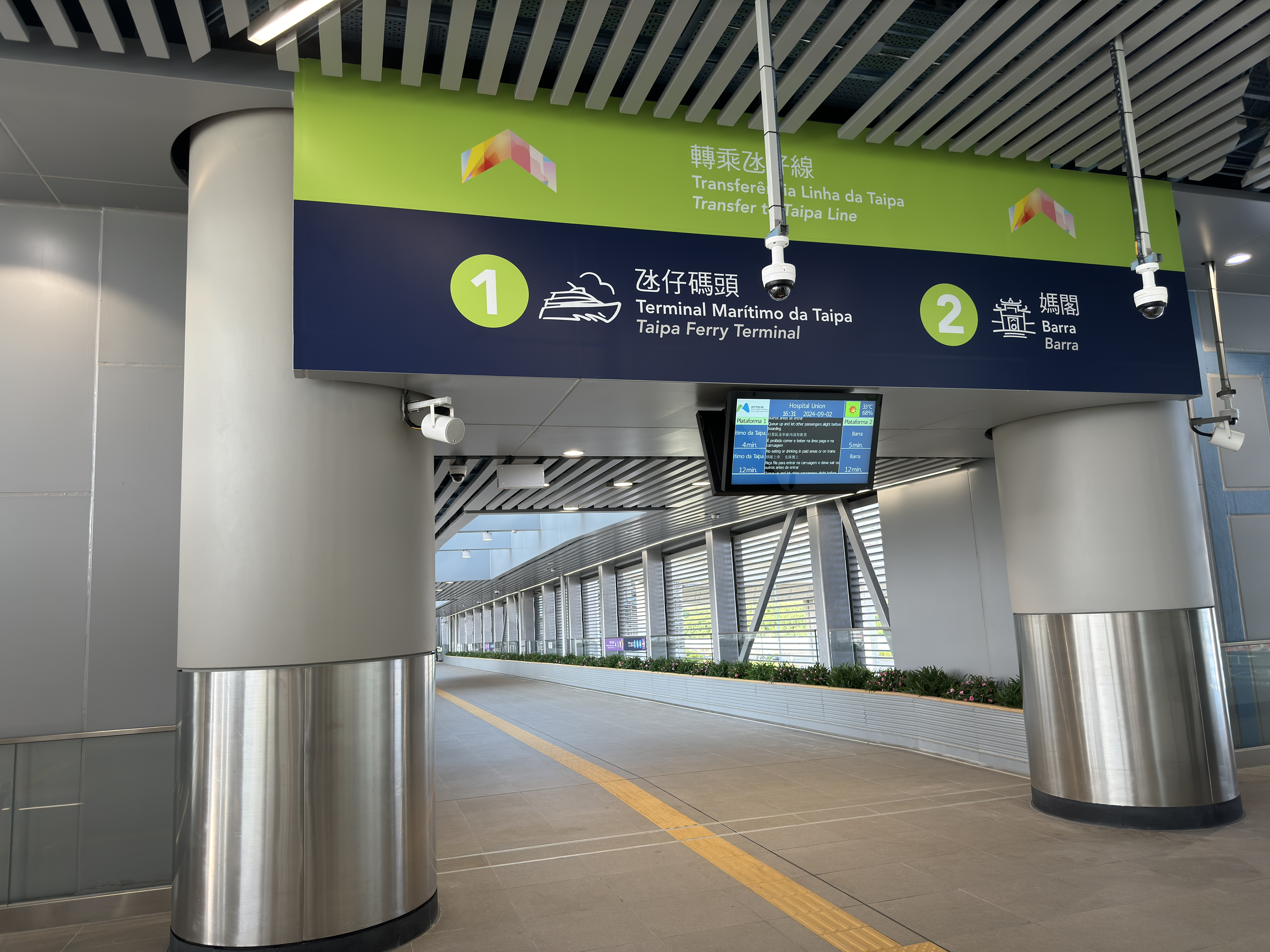
The transfer passage towards the Taipa Line platform

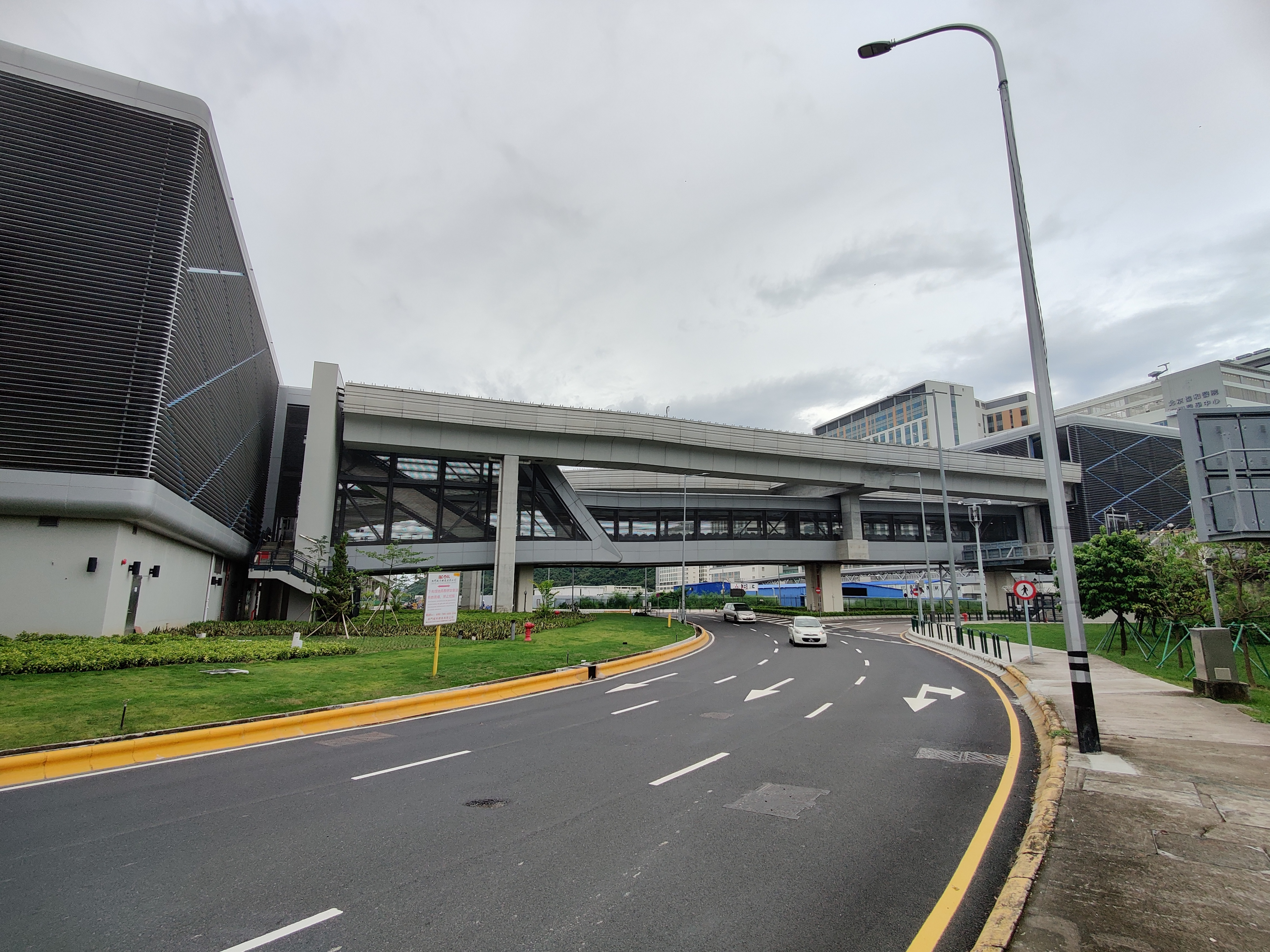
Exterior of the transfer passage

== Usage ==
The Taipa Line platform and station lobby of this station opened on September 1, 2024.

After the opening of the Seac Pai Van line, the platform for it on the south side of the station was also opened at the same time, as the first interchange station of the Macau Light Rail Link to be opened, but due to the long walking distance of the interchange passage and the need to get on and off the platform between the Taipa Line and the Seac Pai Van line, it is relatively inconvenient for some elderly people or people with reduced mobility.

== History ==
=== Early ideas ===
On 10 January 2014, the Transport Infrastructure Office launched the "Call for Opinions on the Feasibility Study of the Seac Pai Van line of the Macao Light Rail System", which lasted for 45 days and ended on 23 February. Among them, there are three options for the construction of this station and to be set up as an intermediate station on the Shek Pai Wan Line. Among them, the main station of Options 1 and 2 is located on the west side of the outlying islands medical complex, while the main station of Option 3 is located opposite the main entrance of the outlying islands medical complex.

On 23 August 2015, the Transport Infrastructure Office announced the "Call for Opinions on the Feasibility Study of the Seac Pai Van line of the Macao Light Rail System" and recommended Option 1.

=== Modified design ===
In 2019, the Taipa Line platform of this station has been reserved for connecting to the Seac Pai Van line.

On July 23, 2020, the station and the Seac Pai Van line conducted public bidding for the project. The Construction and Development Office will conduct public tendering for the "C390B Light Rail Seac Pai Van line Main Construction Project", with a total construction period of 960 working days. For the first time, the tender announcement clearly abandoned the earlier recommended option 1, cancelled the original transfer plan of Lianhua Port Station, and replaced it with an additional interchange station between Lianhua Port Station and East Asian Games Station on the Taipa Line, thus reducing the number of stations on the route to two, and at the same time building a footbridge at this station to connect to the medical complex on the outlying islands.

On 20 May 2021, after reviewing the tenders, the Construction and Development Office considered that the bidding amount and construction period of the bidders were significantly low, and there was a possibility of serious overspending, and the Construction Office had to revise the plans. Therefore, the Macau Government announced the withdrawal of the C390B tender and re-tendering at a later date.。

On June 2, 2021, the "Main Construction Project of the Light Rail Seac Pai Van line" restarted the bidding process.。

On June 29, 2021, the main project of the Light Rail Seac Pai Van line was opened, according to the Construction Office, after the bid opening process, 10 bids were accepted, and 1 was conditionally accepted, but the documents must be submitted within the specified date. The cost of the project ranges from MOP908 million to MOP1.008 billion, and the construction period ranges from 638 working days to 760 working days.。

=== Construction ===
On August 13, 2021, the main project of the Light Rail Seac Pai Van line was officially awarded, and the construction was undertaken by China Road and Bridge Engineering Co., Ltd. for nearly 930 million patacas, and the project date was 685 working days.

In October 2021, the first phase of construction of the main construction project of the Shek Pai Wan Line began.。

In December 2021, the construction of the main construction project of the Seac Pai Bay Line entered the second phase.

From October 29 to November 17, 2022, the station began construction of the transfer bridge and placed temporary gantry brackets in the existing traffic lanes.

From December 1 to 21, 2022, the station carried out the hoisting construction of the connecting bridge of the transfer station.

In mid-February 2023, the Public Works Bureau stated that the construction project was expected to be completed in February 2024.

=== Conduct station testing ===
On 8 January 2024, the Secretary for Transport and Public Works, Mr Lo Lap-man, said that station and train tests had been commenced on the Seac Pai Van line, making it clear that the line would not be operated by the MTR (Macau). The light rail company was expected to be responsible for the more content awarded.。

On March 31, 2024, the main project of the Seac Pai Van line was basically completed, and the station was renamed "Union Hospital Station", and various systems and train operation tests were carried out. The train test will be carried out in three phases, the first stage will be within the Seac Pai Van line, the second stage will be extended to the interchange station (Lotus Roundland) via the Taipa Line, and the third stage will be the entire line.

=== Opening ===
On September 1, 2024, the station was partially opened, allowing passengers on the Taipa Line to go to Union Medical College Hospital of Macau through this station, while the Seac Pai Van line platform has not yet been activated.。

On November 1, 2024, the Seac Pai Van line was officially opened to traffic, with the first train departing from Seac Pai Wan Station at 13:11 on the same day. The station has been fully opened since then, making it the first interchange station in the Macau Light Rail Network.
