= Taipa line =

Railway line in Macau

Taipa Line

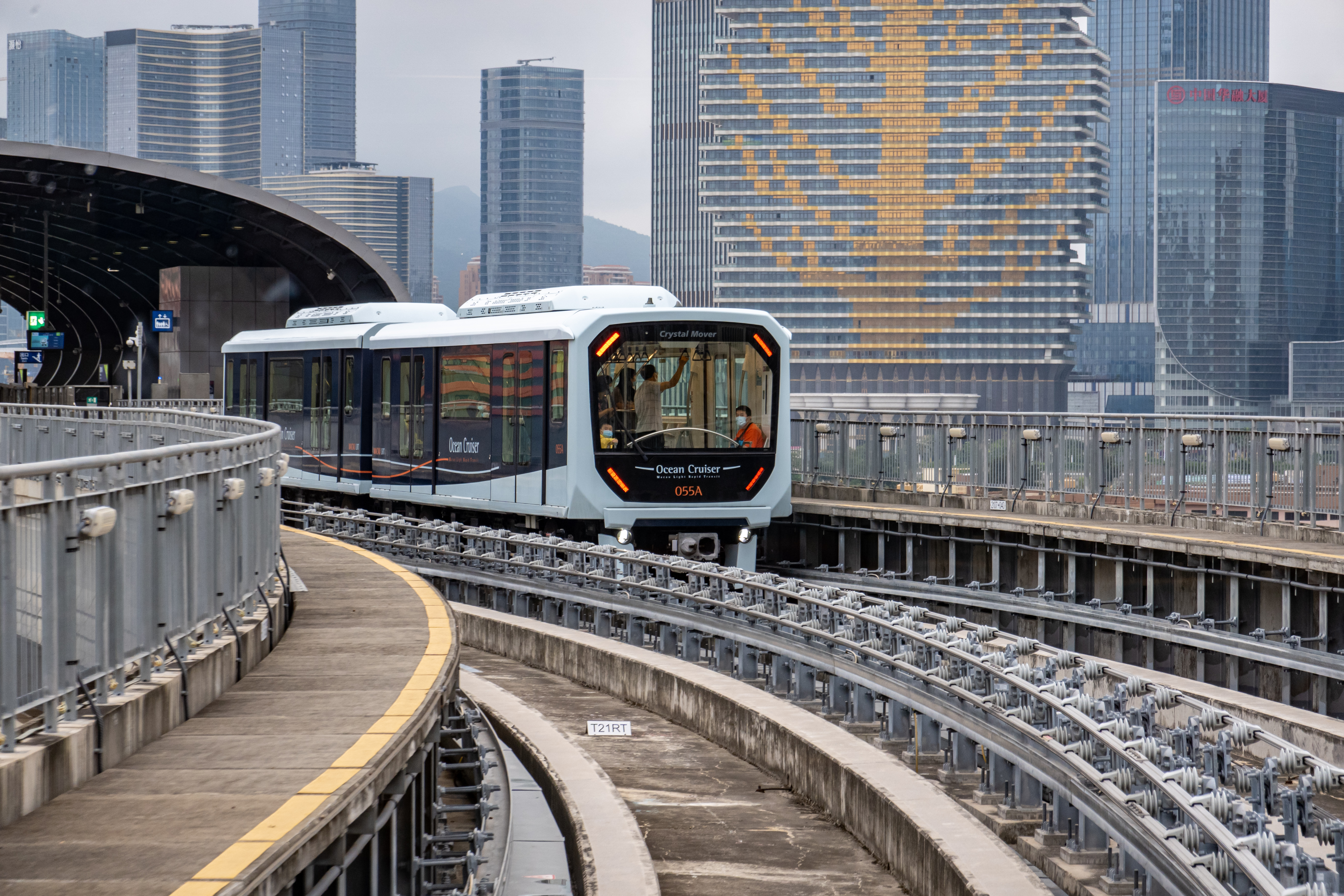
- An operating train

Overview
- Status: In Operation
- Owner: Macau
- Locale: São Lourenço, Freguesia de Nossa Senhora do Carmo and Zona do Aterro de Cotai, Macau
- Termini: Barra; Taipa Ferry Terminal
- Stations: 13

Service
- Type: Automated guideway transit/People mover
- System: Macau Light Rapid Transit
- Services: 1
- Operator: Macau Light Rapid Transit

History
- Opened: 10 December 2019

Technical
- Line length: 12.5 km (7.77 mi)
- Num of tracks: 2
- Character: Elevated, At-grade & Underground
Route map

The Taipa line (Chinese: 氹仔線; Jyutping: tam5 zai2 sin3; Portuguese: Linha da Taipa) is the first line in Macau Light Rapid Transit. The line initially opened on 10 December 2019, providing service between Ocean and Taipa Ferry Terminal as the first phase of the Taipa line. The automated guideway transit line has a U-shaped route within the island of Taipa and currently connects 13 stations; a link to Macau Peninsula officially opened on 8 December 2023.

== Timeline ==
After more than seven years of construction, the Taipa line between Ocean and Taipa Ferry Terminal, previously known as Macau-Taipa Line Phase I (Taipa section), began operations on 10 December 2019, serving a total of 11 stations with 9.3 km in length.

The system closed on 19 October 2021 for six months to replace all 124 km (77 mi) of high voltage cables.

The Taipa–Barra extension of 3.4 km opened on 8 December 2023, with service first covering Macau Peninsula.

Union Hospital station opened on 1 September 2024, providing a platform for interchange with the Seac Pai Van line opening on 1 November 2024.

== Stations ==
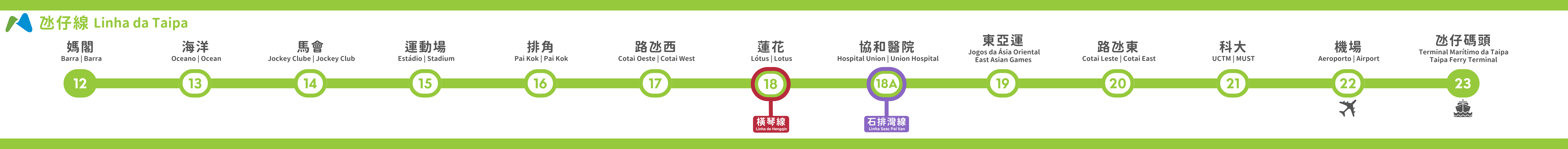

Station Info		Station Name			Connections	Freguesia/Zone
Livery	Station No.	English	Chinese	Portuguese	Connections	Freguesia/Zone
	12	Barra (Note: Service extends to Barra station on 8 December 2023.)	媽閣	Barra		São Lourenço
	13	Ocean	海洋	Oceano		Freguesia de Nossa Senhora do Carmo
	14	Jockey Club	馬會	Jockey Clube		Freguesia de Nossa Senhora do Carmo
	15	Stadium	運動場	Estádio		Freguesia de Nossa Senhora do Carmo
	16	Pai Kok	排角	Pai Kok		Freguesia de Nossa Senhora do Carmo
	17	Cotai West	路氹西	Cotai Oeste		Zona do Aterro de Cotai
	18	Lotus (Note: Formerly named Lotus Checkpoint.)	蓮花	Lótus	Hengqin	Zona do Aterro de Cotai
	18A	Union Hospital	協和醫院	Hospital Union	Seac Pai Van	Zona do Aterro de Cotai
	19	East Asian Games	東亞運	Jogos da Ásia Oriental		Zona do Aterro de Cotai
	20	Cotai East	路氹東	Cotai Leste		Zona do Aterro de Cotai
	21	MUST	科大	UCTM		Freguesia de Nossa Senhora do Carmo
	22	Airport	機場	Aeroporto		Freguesia de Nossa Senhora do Carmo
	23	Taipa Ferry Terminal	氹仔碼頭	Terminal Marítimo da Taipa	East (2029)	Freguesia de Nossa Senhora do Carmo
