= Taipa Pequena =

Hill in Macau, People's Republic of China

Taipa Pequena 小潭山
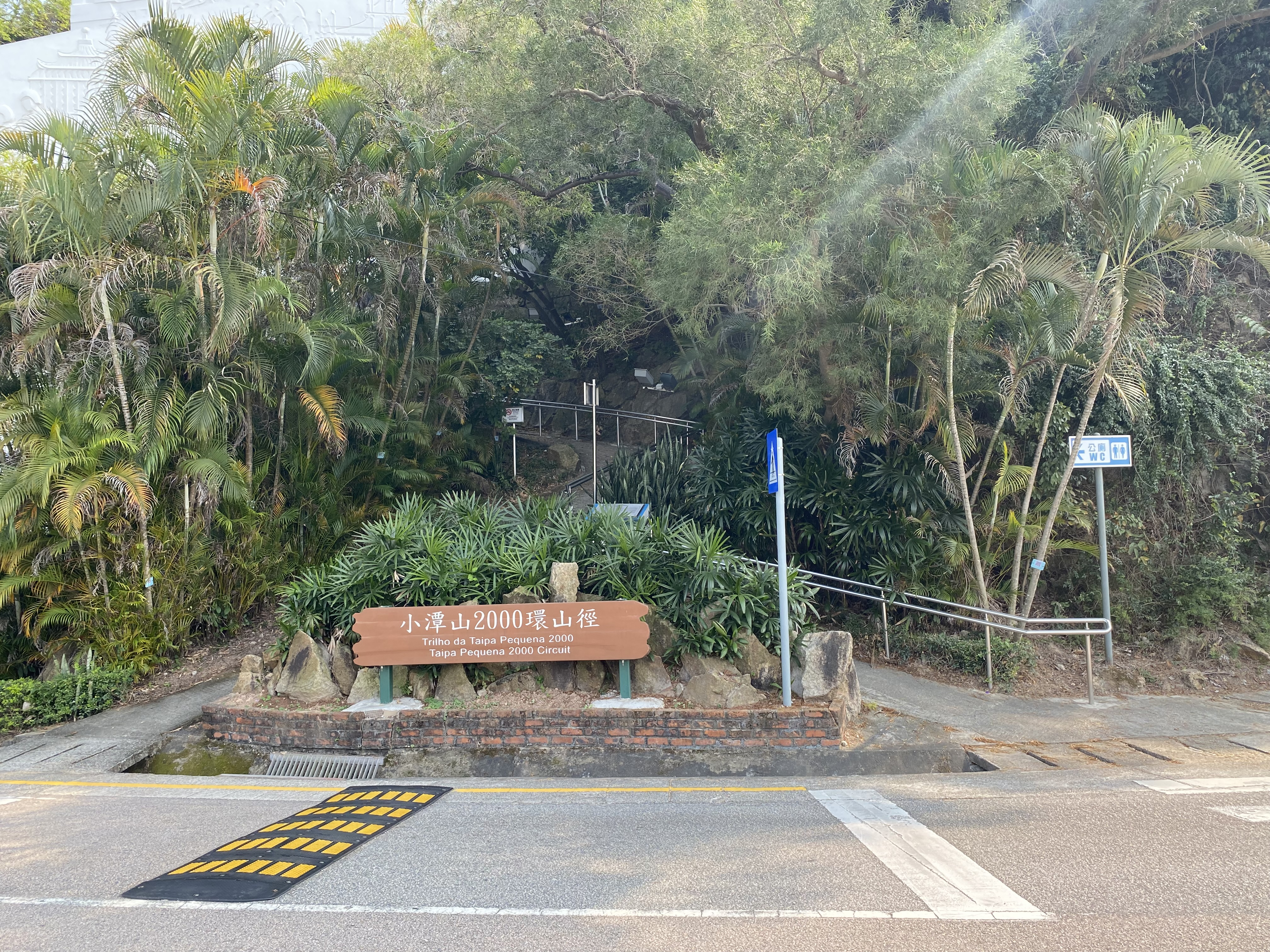

Highest point
- Elevation: 110.8 m (364 ft)
- Prominence: 85 m (279 ft)
- Coordinates: 22°09′39″N 113°32′49″E

Geography
- Location within Macau
- Location: Taipa, Macau

The Taipa Pequena (Chinese: 小潭山; Portuguese: Taipa Pequena), also known as Bodhi Mountain, is a hill located in Taipa, Macau, with an elevation of 110.8 meters.

== Facility ==
Taipa Pequena is equipped with pedestrian facilities named the Taipa Pequena 2000 Circuit. Open to the public in 1999, it spans a total length of 2300 meters and features three entrances and exits. The Taipa Pequena 2000 Circuit is also the widest path on the island of Macau, serving as a leisure and entertainment spot for residents.

== See also ==
- Geography of Macau
