= Macau Light Rapid Transit =

Mass transit system

- Macau Light Rail Transit Logo

Overview
- Native name: Chinese: 澳門輕軌系統; Portuguese: Metro Ligeiro de Macau
- Owner: Macao Light Rapid Transit Corporation Limited
- Area served: Taipa; Cotai; Macau Peninsula; Coloane; Hengqin
- Locale: Macau
- Transit type: Automated guideway transit
- Number of lines: 3
- Number of stations: 15
- Website: mlm.com.mo

Operation
- Began operation: 10 December 2019; 6 years ago
- Operator: Macao Light Rapid Transit Corporation Limited

Technical
- System length: 16.3 km (10 mi)
- Track gauge: N/A - rubber-tired wheels
System map

Macau Light Rapid Transit

Chinese name
- Traditional Chinese: 澳門輕軌系統
- Simplified Chinese: 澳门轻轨系统
Transcriptions
Standard Mandarin
- Hanyu Pinyin: Àomén Qīngguǐ Xìtǒng
Yue: Cantonese
- Jyutping: ou^{3} mun^{4*2} hing^{1} gwai^{2} hai^{6} tung^{2}

Portuguese name
- Portuguese: Metro Ligeiro de Macau

The Macau Light Rapid Transit (MLRT in its short form, Chinese: 澳門輕軌系統; Portuguese: Metro Ligeiro de Macau, MLM) is a rubber-tired automated guideway transit system in Macau and the first railway system in the city. The first phase of the project's construction began in February 2012, and the first section of the Taipa line was opened to the public on 10 December 2019. The Barra extension of the Taipa line opened in 2023, with the Seac Pai Van and Hengqin lines subsequently opening in 2024.

MTR (Macau), a wholly owned subsidiary of MTR, operated and maintained the MLM under the operations and maintenance assistance services (O&M Contract) until it expired in December 2024. Between 1 April 2024 and 31 December 2024, the Macao Light Rapid Transit Corporation Limited (MLM) gradually became directly responsible for the operations and maintenance assistance services of the MLM. The Macao SAR Government signed a 10-year concession contract with MLM for the operation and maintenance of MLRT in September 2019.

The Taipa Line, being the first line of the light rail system to be opened, runs from Barra station to Taipa Ferry Terminal station, with a total length of 12.5 km (7.8 mi) and a total of 13 stations. Overall, the Taipa Line has been reported to have cost around 10 billion patacas. Once completed, the entire system is expected to serve the Macau Peninsula, Taipa and Cotai, serving major border checkpoints such as the Border Gate, the Outer Harbour Ferry Terminal, the Lotus Bridge border and the Macau International Airport.

In 2025, total passenger volume of Macau Light Rapid Transit reached 9.62 million passengers.

== History ==
=== Conception ===
The LRT was first proposed in 2002 by the Macau SAR Government in the Policy Address for the Fiscal Year 2003 by then Chief Executive of Macau Edmund Ho as a method to "solve the urban transport issues". In the same year, the Macau SAR Government entrusted the Hong Kong Mass Transit Railway Corporation (Now MTR Corporation) to stage a preliminary study on a railway transport system. The original proposal was presented on 19 February 2003, and recommended the construction of an elevated light metro in two stages: the first stage extends for 17 km (11 mi) with 15 stations going from Portas do Cerco and the Outer Harbour Ferry Terminal to Macau Airport via the then constructing Sai Van Bridge, while the second stage would connect the airport with the Cotai (Lotus) Checkpoint and the East Asian Games Dome. The system would mainly cater to tourists, expecting them to take 85% of the projected 43,000 daily rider ship, and was due to open in 2006.

The original proposal for the LRT was criticized by the public for being unable to handle the needs of Macau citizens, obstructing important views of the city, and also for being not cost-effective. Then Secretariat for Transport and Public Works Au Man Long decided to suspend plans for the LRT on 15 April 2003, citing the economic downturn caused by the severe acute respiratory syndrome outbreak at the time.

A second feasibility study was conducted in 2005 by the Mass Transit Railway Corporation, analysing possible routes for the LRT. The second study recommended a mixed underground and elevated system, with three separate lines: One peninsula encirclement line, one Macau-Taipa Line, and one Airport Line. Based on the second feasibility study and public opinion regarding it, the Macau SAR government in October 2006 released the Detailed Research Program for MLRT report that outlines a route for the LRT similar to the Phase I Line today. The report recommended elevating the entire LRT line to Phase I for budget reasons, and it proposed only one line that stretches for 22 km (14 mi) with 26 stations. The Macau SAR Government, after considering the opinions of the public, called for the construction of the LRT in November 2007 after publishing their optimization program report months earlier. The optimization program report stated that the Mass Transit Railway Corporation, together with an international consortium, should be tasked with the construction of the LRT.

Site investigation work started in 2008. Under the plan, Phase I (Macau–Taipa Line) would connect major entry-exit points at the Macau Peninsula and the Taipa Island with residential and tourist areas. It uses reserved space in the lower deck of the Ponte de Sai Van (Sai Van Bridge) to connect to Taipa island. Phase II (Loop Line) would connect the Barrier gate to A-Ma Temple via the inner harbour area, eventually forming a loop on the Macau peninsula. The LRT is expected to improve transportation options between the Macau Peninsula, Taipa and Cotai, and relieve traffic congestion on roads and bridges.

=== Construction ===
In October 2009, the construction of the LRT was announced by the Macau SAR Government, with the goal for the system to be operational by 2013. Several changes were made to the plan, including reducing the number of stations to 21 and building part of the LRT running along Nam Van Lake underground or at the surface level. However, due to the constant changes to the path of the LRT, as well as an appeal from one of the tender companies, the start date for construction was delayed for multiple times, and substantial work on the LRT did not commence until 2012.

In December 2010, the government announced that Mitsubishi Heavy Industries was chosen to provide the rolling stock and the system for the LRT, with a winning bid of 4.68 billion Macau Patacas. A contract would then be signed in March 2011, which would entail an order of 55 sets of 2-carriage rolling stock, as well as the accompanying communications and operating systems for the daily operation of the LRT.

The estimated construction cost for Phase 1 (with 21 stations) was revised in June 2011 from MOP 7.5 billion (about US$933 million) to MOP 11 billion (about US$1,370 million) including MOP 360 million for studies, MOP 4.9 billion for rolling stock and MOP 5.74 billion for construction. The project will be financed by the Government of Macau and is scheduled to take about 48 months to complete. Six design packages have been awarded, and the open tenders were expected to be published by October 2011, starting by the Taipa packages C250 and C260. To power up the operation of the LRT, CEM also built two primary substations.

Main construction work began on 21 February 2012 in Taipa. The Taipa section is expected to operate by 2019, and Macau Peninsula section to be operating sometime by the early 2020s. Despite the official schedule, analysts did project the initial phase to not be in operation until 2017. The Third Special Audit Report on the First Phase of the Light Rail Transit System published by the Commission of Audit in January 2015 indicated that the construction of the Macau Light Rail Transit was delayed by 883 days.

In January 2018, the Secretariat for Transport and Public Works Raimundo Arrais do Rosário stated that the Macau section of the LRT was "not top priority" and that priority would be given to the East line, which was formally presented on the same day.

=== Operation ===
In September 2019, the Macao SAR Government has signed a 10-year concession contract with MLM for the operation and maintenance of MLRT.

The Taipa line began operations on 10 December 2019, and initially offered free rides from its opening until 31 December, which was later extended to 31 January 2020.

In September 2020, preliminary plans for the East Line were released by the government for public consultation. Construction of the Hengqin extension began on 18 March 2021.

The system closed on 19 October 2021 for six months to replace all 124 km (77 mi) of high voltage cables.

Service extended to Macau Peninsula with Barra station opened on 8 December 2023 with new fare zone added.

Macao Light Rapid Transit Corporation, Limited (MLM) is directly responsible for the operations and maintenance assistance services of the MLRT from 1 April 2024.

The Union Hospital station opened on 1 September 2024, which also provided an interchange with the new Seac Pai Van Line that had opened in 1 November 2024. On 2 December 2024, the Hengqin Line opened to the public, connecting the border crossing in Zhuhai of China and Macau for cross-border traffic.

== Network ==
Lines in operation or construction

Long-term plans of the Macau Light Rapid Transit

=== Operating ===
Line	Termini		Length (km)	Stations	Date opened	Latest extension
Taipa	Barra	Taipa Ferry Terminal	12.5	13	10 December 2019	1 September 2024
Seac Pai Van	Union Hospital	Seac Pai Van	1.6	2	1 November 2024	
Hengqin	Lotus	Hengqin	2.2	2	2 December 2024	

=== Under construction ===
Line	Termini		Length (km)	Stations	Expected opening
East	Border Gate	Taipa Ferry Terminal	7.7	7	2029

=== Planning or proposed ===
Line	Termini		Length (km)	Stations	Status
East	Border Gate	Ilha Verde	1	2	Planning
South	Barra	Hong Kong–Zhuhai–Macau Bridge		9	Planning
West	Border Gate	Barra	6	6 or 7	Long-Term Planning
Taipa Northern Link	Ocean			5	Proposed

== Rolling stock ==
Ocean Cruiser
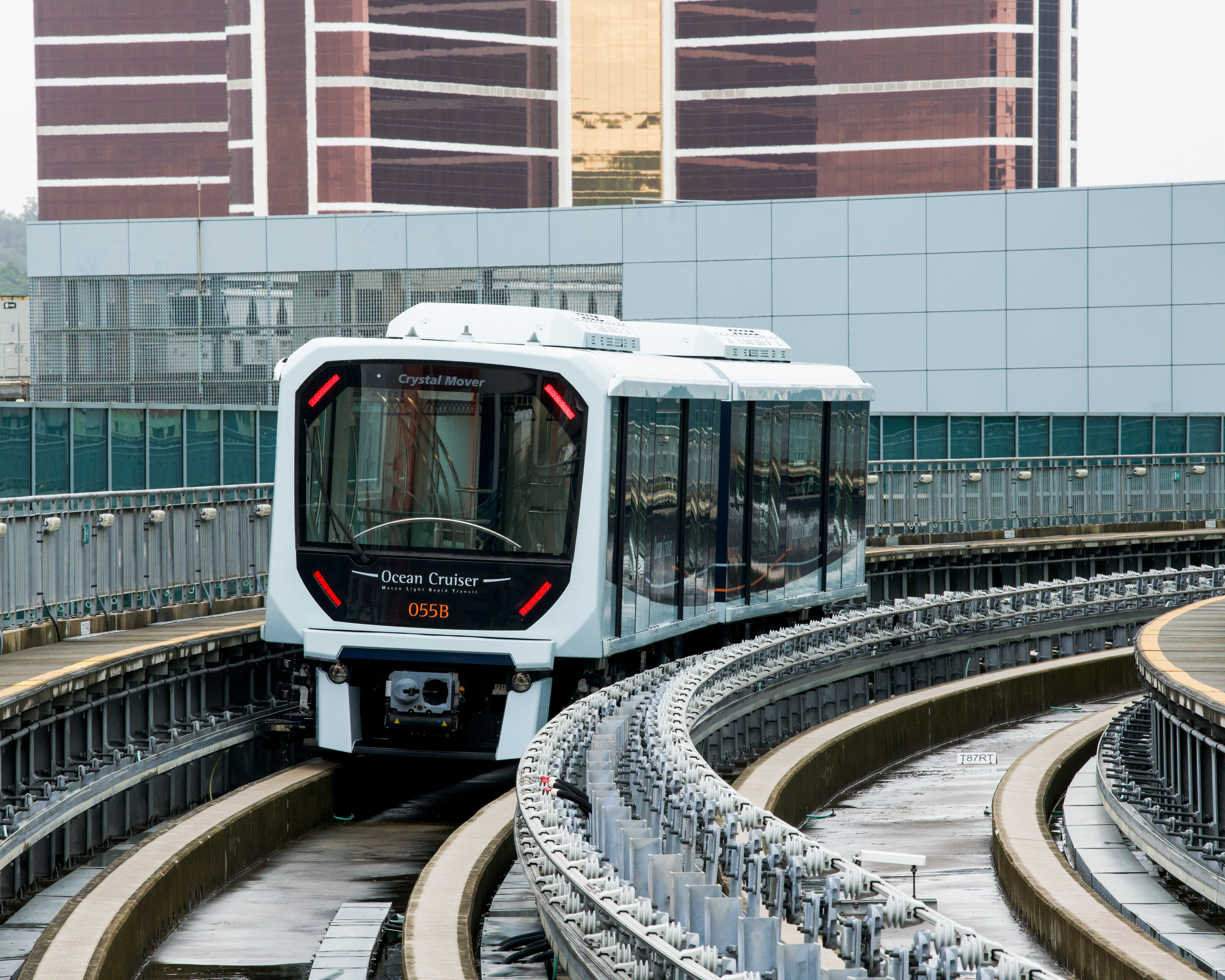
- Manufacturer: Mitsubishi Heavy Industries
- Constructed: 2012–2016
- Number built: 55 trains (110 cars)
- Capacity: 105
- Operator: Macau LRT
- Depot: Macao Light Rapid Transit Depot

Specifications
- Car body construction: Aluminum
- Car length: 11 metres (36 ft 1 in)
- Width: 3 metres (9 ft 10 in)
- Height: 4 metres (13 ft 1 in)
- Doors: 4 sets (2 sets per side) per car
- Traction system: Toyo Denki RG6018-A-M IGBT-VVVF
- Traction motors: TDK-6453-A
- Power output: 115 kW

The LRT uses Mitsubishi Heavy Industries Crystal Mover APM vehicles with rubber tyres running on concrete tracks, similar to the Singapore LRT. Mitsubishi supplied 55 two-car trains that are fully automated (driverless) and utilize a rubber-tyred APM system. They have a capacity of up to 476 passengers. The car is named Ocean Cruiser.

The Macau government ordered 110 carriages in March 2011, and an additional 48 carriages in January 2014, for a total of 158 carriages in two batches. However, in May 2018, the Macau authorities cancelled the contract to purchase an additional 48 carriages from Mitsubishi Heavy Industries and were required to compensate 360 million patacas.

LRT cars are serviced and stored at Macao Light Rapid Transit Depot next to Macau International Airport and across from Wynn Palace in Cotai.

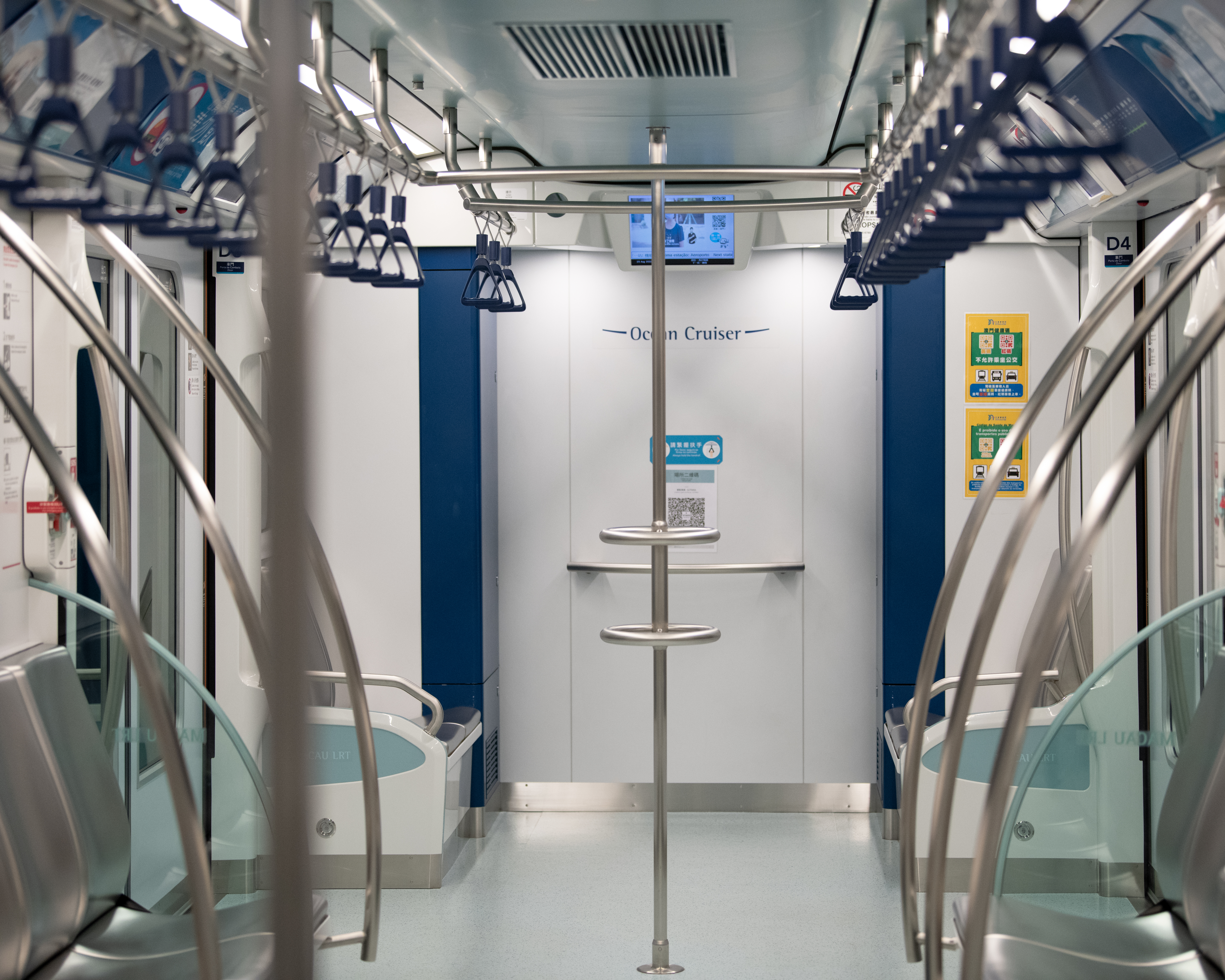
Interior of Ocean Cruiser

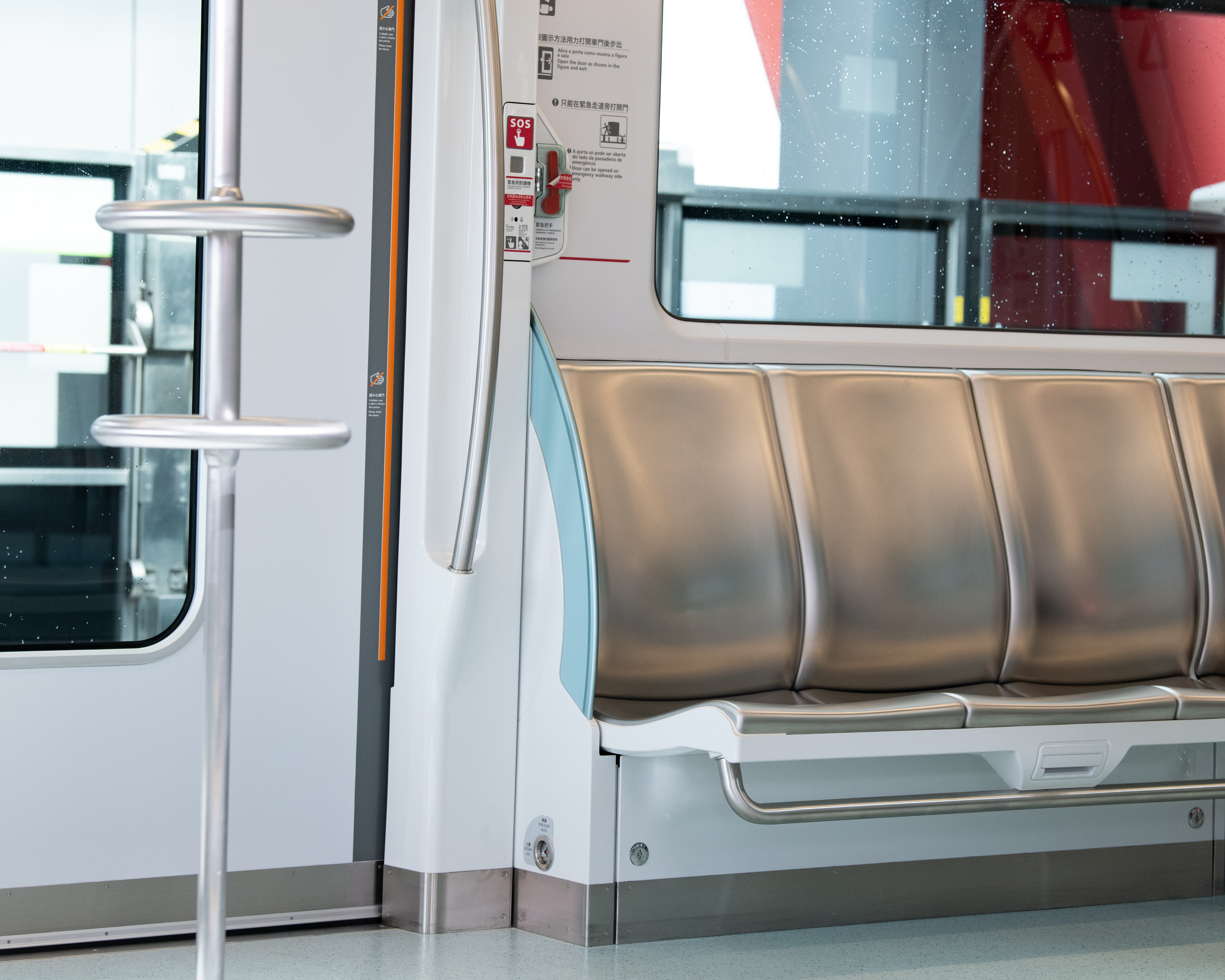
Seats of Ocean Cruiser

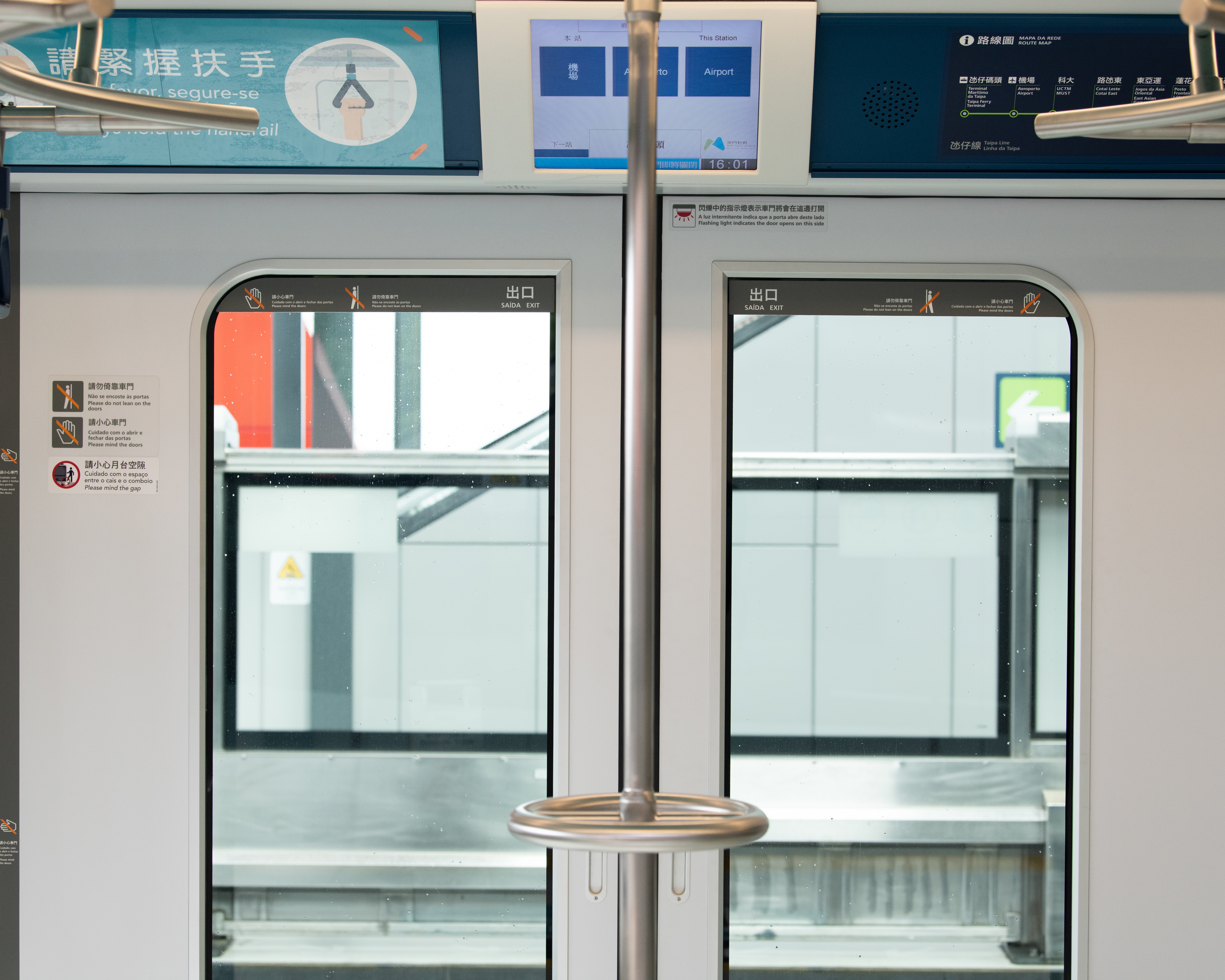
Train Door of Ocean Cruiser

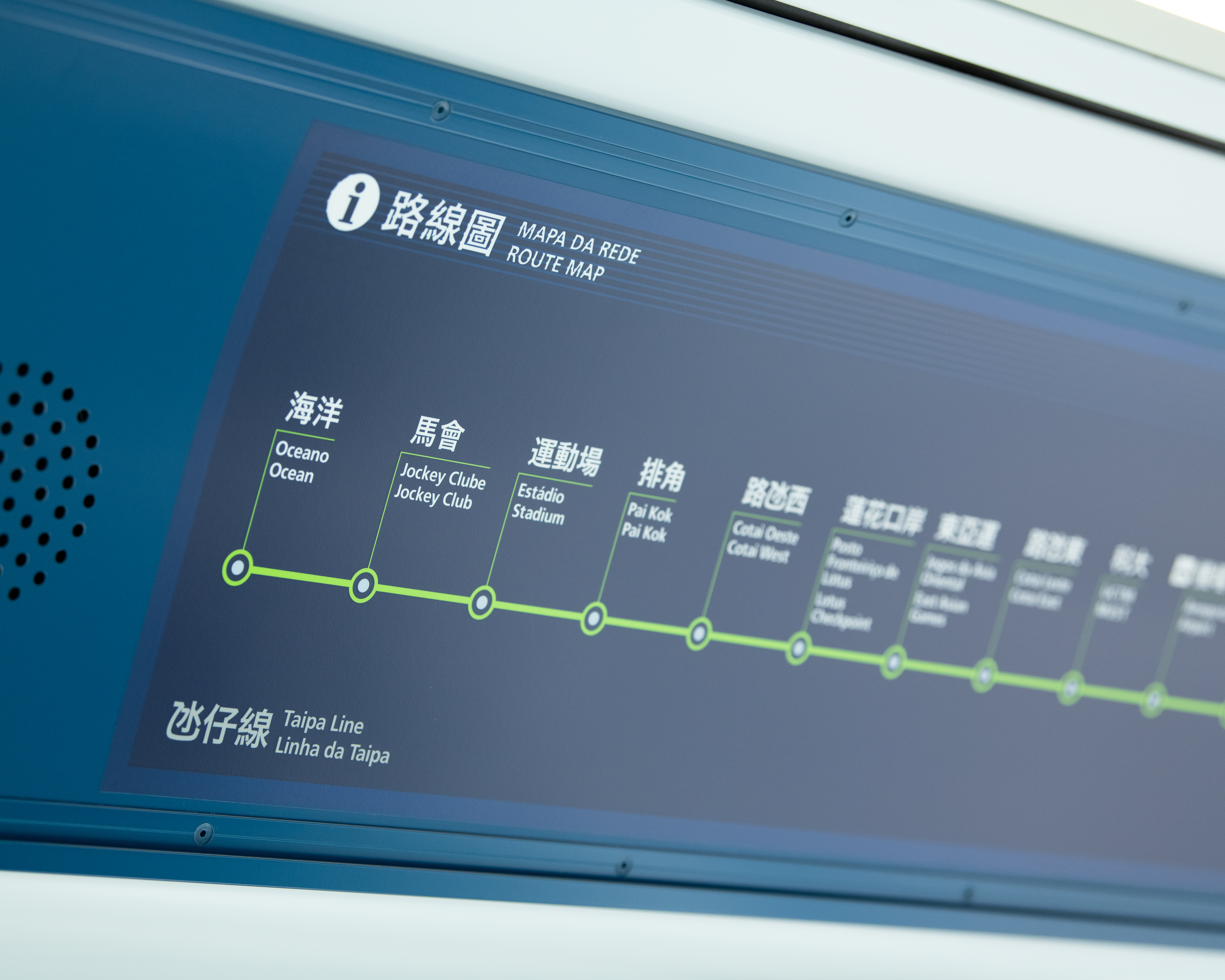
Route Map of Ocean Cruiser

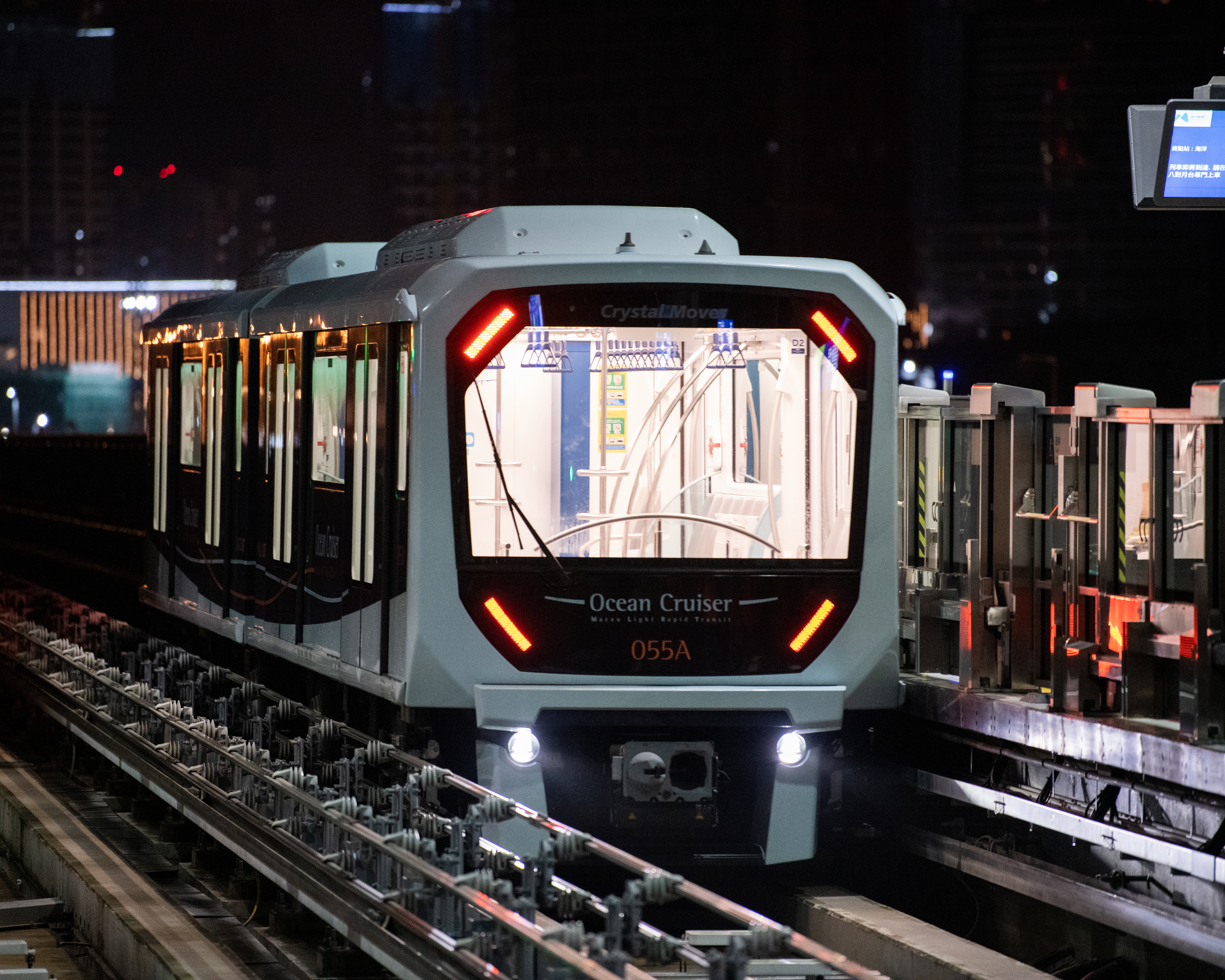
Ocean Cruiser at Stadium station

== Pricing ==
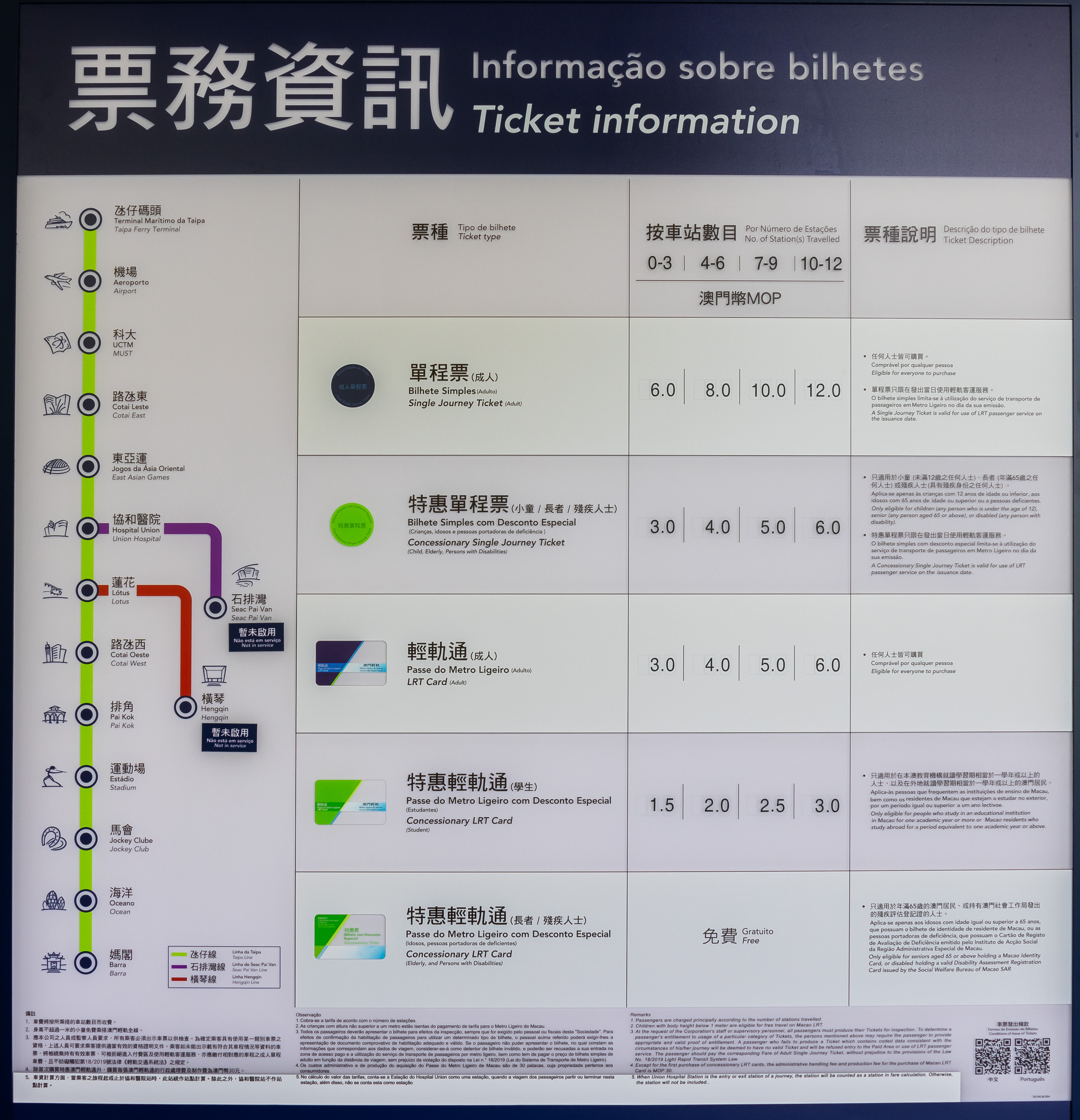
Ticket prices of Macau LRT

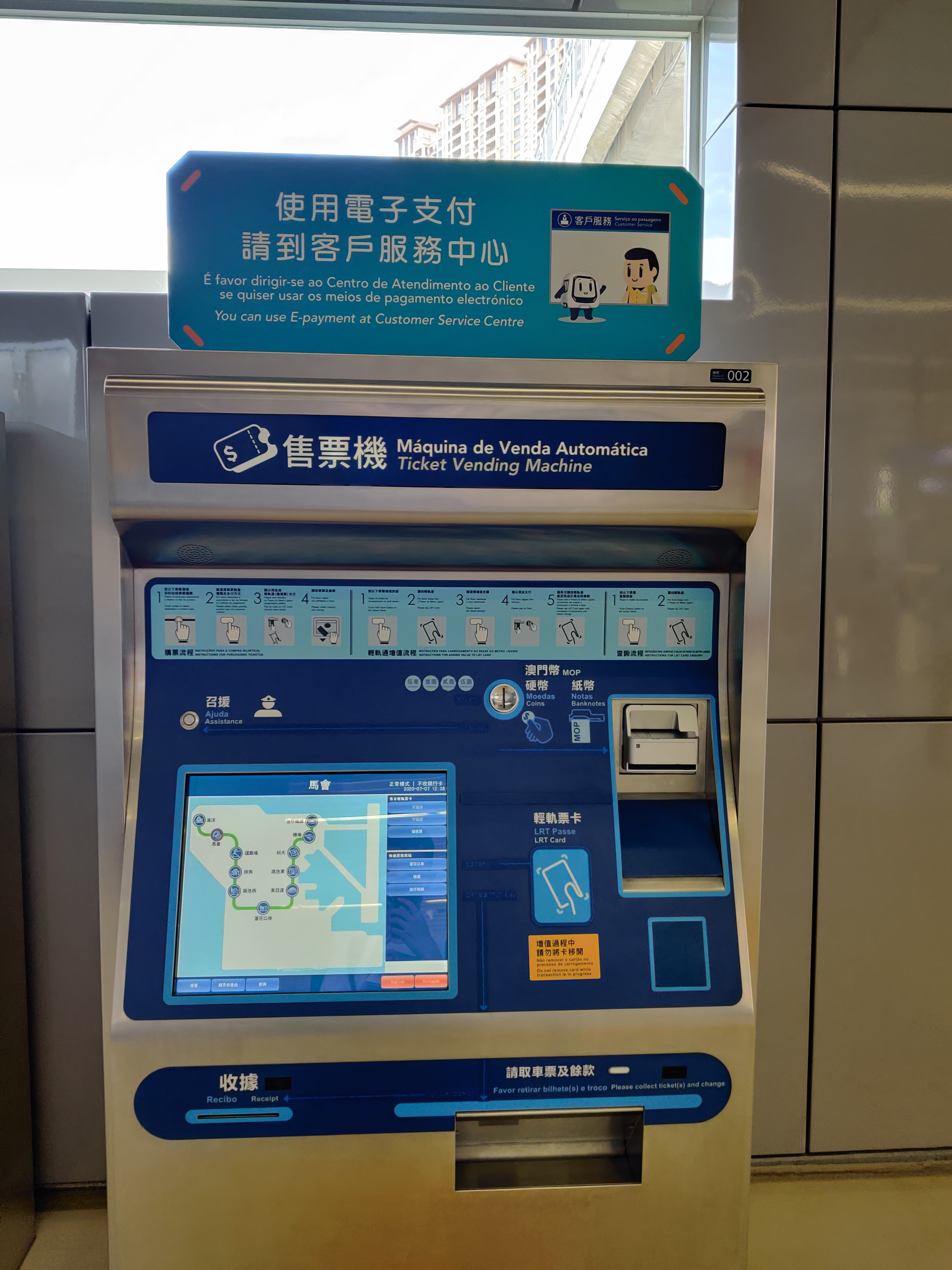
Ticket Machine

Ticket prices are based on the number of stations a passenger travels through. Those who pay with a stored-value LRT card will receive discounted fares. However when calculating the fare, the cross-sea sections from Barra to Ocean and from Lotus to Hengqin are regarded as two stations; Union Hospital is not considered as a station, except for those entering or exiting in Union Hospitial or Seac Pai Van.

Any passenger staying in the paid area over an hour (60 minutes) must pay an additional amount equivalent to the minimum fare for an adult Single Journey ticket (6 patacas), for each 30 minutes exceeding the time limit.

Children below 1 m (3 ft 3 3/8 in) in height can travel for free, but must be accompanied by an adult. All prices are in MOP.

Passenger can buy single journey ticket at ticket vending machines (Only MOP banknotes and coins in circulation are accepted; except 1,000 MOP banknote) or at customer service center.

Note: If passenger have transaction by following currencies at customer service center: RMB, HKD (all at a 1:1 exchange rate), only banknotes with denomination above 10 RMB are accepted. In addition, all HKD coins and banknotes with all denomination in circulation are accepted (except 10 HKD coin not accepted, all RMB coins in circulation also not accepted). Change is given only in MOP.

Number of stations	Single Journey		LRT Card/Macau Pass		
Number of stations	Adult	Concessionary	Adult	Student	Elderly/Disabled
0 to 3	$6	$3	$3	$1.5	Free
4 to 6	$8	$4	$4	$2	Free
7 to 9	$10	$5	$5	$2.5	Free
10 to 12	$12	$6	$6	$3	Free

== See also ==
- Transportation in Macau
- List of metro systems
