= Barra station =

Macau Light Rapid Transit station

Barra 媽閣
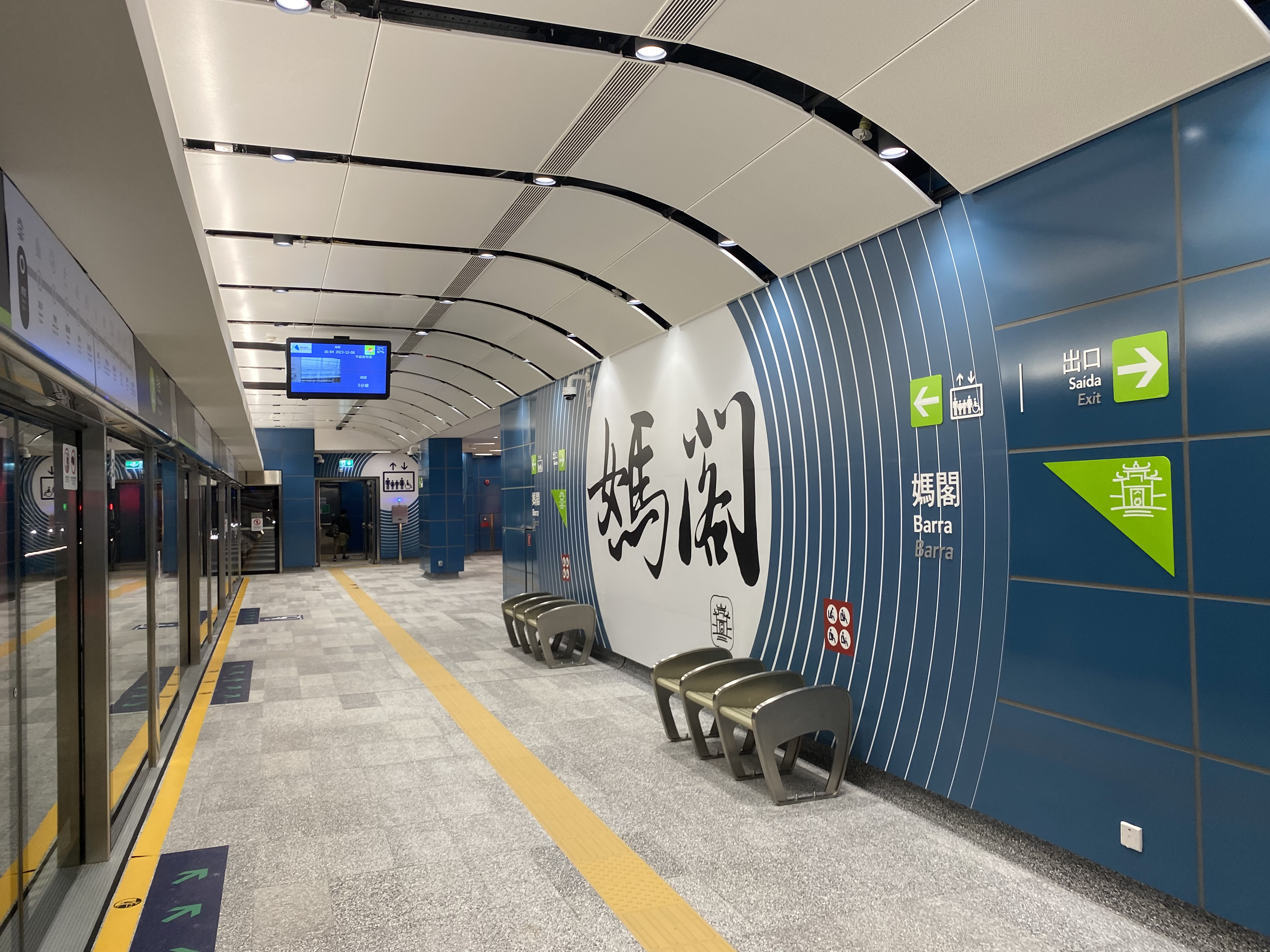
- Platform 2 of Barra station, December 2023

General information
- Location: Avenida Panorâmica Do Lago Sai Van; São Lourenço; Macau
- Coordinates: 22.183431°N 113.529831°E
- Operated by: Macao Light Rapid Transit Corporation, Limited
- Line: Taipa
- Platforms: 2 side platforms

Construction
- Structure type: Underground

Other information
- Station code: ST12

History
- Opened: 8 December 2023

Services
Preceding station	Macau Light Rapid Transit	Following station
Terminus	Taipa line	Ocean towards Taipa Ferry Terminal
Route map
Location

Barra station (Chinese: 媽閣站; Portuguese: Estação de Barra) is the terminus of the Taipa line of the Macau Light Rapid Transit, named after the area where A-Ma Temple is located. The first station in Macau Peninsula, Barra station opened on 8 December 2023 and connects the Taipa section of the line via Sai Van Bridge.

== History ==
As the structure of the Barra station depends on the alignment of the peninsula section of light rail transit, it did not come into service with other Taipa line stations in 2019.

After considering the technological requirements and the potential visual impact on the heritage site, the 2009 proposal of LRT suggested expanding Barra station, while the station structure and tracks between the station and Praia Grande would be both underground. The design of the adjacent public transport interchange was finished in March 2011 and public consultation began afterwards. The construction work of the interchange commenced in January 2015.

The building of the station started in November 2017, and was completed in March 2023, in line with expectations. The public transport interchange had opened earlier last December as a bus terminus and public car park.

The station opened on 8 December 2023. Dozens of railfans waited overnight for the first train that runs across the harbour between the peninsula and Taipa.

== Station layout ==
Barra station is the first in the system that has its own calligraphy design and platform screen doors.

Two side platforms were on the basement level. The ticket hall is located between the platform and ground level, while most of the exits are on the ground floor, except one that allows seamless access to the bus terminus from platform 1. Passengers may also enjoy the view of Zhuhai from the roof garden.

F1		Rooftop Garden
G	Square	Shops, toilets, transport hub
M Mezzanine	Concourse	Customer service centre, ticket machines, toilets, shops
L1 Platforms	Side platform; doors open on the left
L1 Platforms	Platform 1	Taipa towards Taipa Ferry Terminal (Ocean)	arrow for R
L1 Platforms	Platform 2	Taipa termination platform
L1 Platforms	Side platform, doors will open on the left

Number	Indicated Direction	Image	Nearby Destinations
D2	Public Square		Public Square; Macao Custom Service; Macau Contemporary Art Center - Navy Yard No.1 and No.2; A-Ma Temple; Maritime Museum; S. Tiago da Barra Street; Institute for Municipal Affairs IAM Barra Archive
B	Barra Leisure Area		Barra Leisure Area; Avenida Panorâmica do Lago de Sai Van
C	S.Tiago Hotel		S.Tiago Hotel; Barra Public Transport Interchange; Avenida da República; Sai Van Lake
D1	Barra Public Transport Interchange		Barra Public Transport Interchange; Bus Terminal; Heavy Vehicles Park at Barra Public Transport Interchange; Car Park at Barra Public Transport Interchange
D2	Barra Public Transport Interchange		Barra Public Transport Interchange; Bus Terminal; Heavy Vehicles Park at Barra Public Transport Interchange; Car Park at Barra Public Transport Interchange

== Usage ==
This is one of the most popular stations as it connects Macau Peninsula and Taipa, especially on weekends and during public holidays. Crowd control measures may be implemented if large-scale ceremonies are held in Macau.

== Future development ==
Under current planning, Barra station would serve as an interchange between the Taipa line and the West line that connects Portas do Cerco and Barra. The construction of the Macau Peninsula line, initially planned to start from Barra station, was abandoned due to disputes on route alignment.
