= Taipa Ferry Terminal station =

Macau Light Rapid Transit station

Terminal Marítimo da Taipa 氹仔碼頭
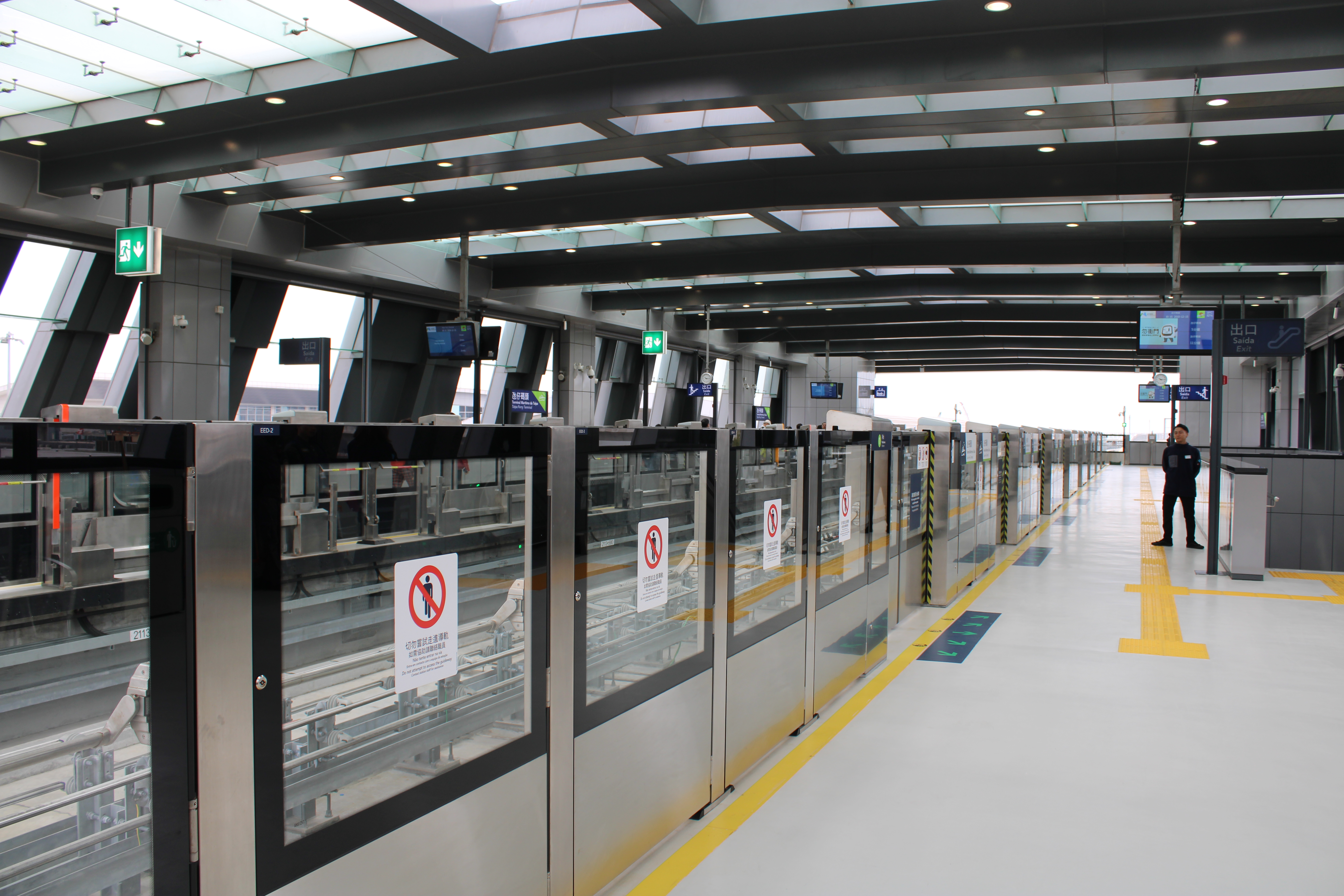
- Platform of Taipa Ferry Terminal station, December 2019

General information
- Location: Estrada de Pac On; Freguesia de Nossa Senhora do Carmo; Macau
- Coordinates: 22.163003°N 113.573869°E
- Operated by: MTR (Macau)
- Line(s): Taipa; East (under construction)
- Platforms: 2 side platforms

Construction
- Structure type: Elevated

Other information
- Station code: ST23

History
- Opened: 10 December 2019

Services
Preceding station	Macau Light Rapid Transit	Following station
Airport towards Barra	Taipa line	Terminus
Future services (2029)
New Urban Zone E1 towards Border Gate	East line	Terminus
Route map
Location

Taipa Ferry Terminal station (Chinese: 氹仔碼頭站; Portuguese: Estação do Terminal Marítimo da Taipa) is the eastern terminus of Taipa line of the Macau Light Rapid Transit.

== History ==
The station is originally named Pac On Ferry Terminal station (Chinese: 北安碼頭站; Portuguese: Estação Terminal Marítimo de Pac On).

Building work of this station began in 2012, and completed in 2015, making it one of the earliest built station in the system. As the terminus of Taipa line, railroad switch were installed at the end for trains to turn back or temporarily stop.

Due to ongoing work at Taipa line train depot, the opening of the station was delayed until 10 December 2019 along with the whole Taipa line.

== Station layout ==
Two side platforms are on the second floor, and ticket hall is located on the first floor. Passengers may access Taipa Ferry Terminal via footbridge on the first floor.

- Exit A: Taipa Ferry Terminal, Migration Service Building of Public Security Police Force, Macau Refuse Incineration Plant

== Future development ==
Taipa Ferry Terminal station is expected to be the terminus of East line, now under construction, as well, which allows two lines to interchange at this station.
