= Hengqin station =

Hengqin station may refer to:

- Hengqin railway station, a station on the Zhuji ICR of the PRDIR.
- Hengqin station (Macau LRT), a station on the Hengqin line of the Macau LRT.
