= Hengqin Port =

Border checkpoint in Zhuhai, China

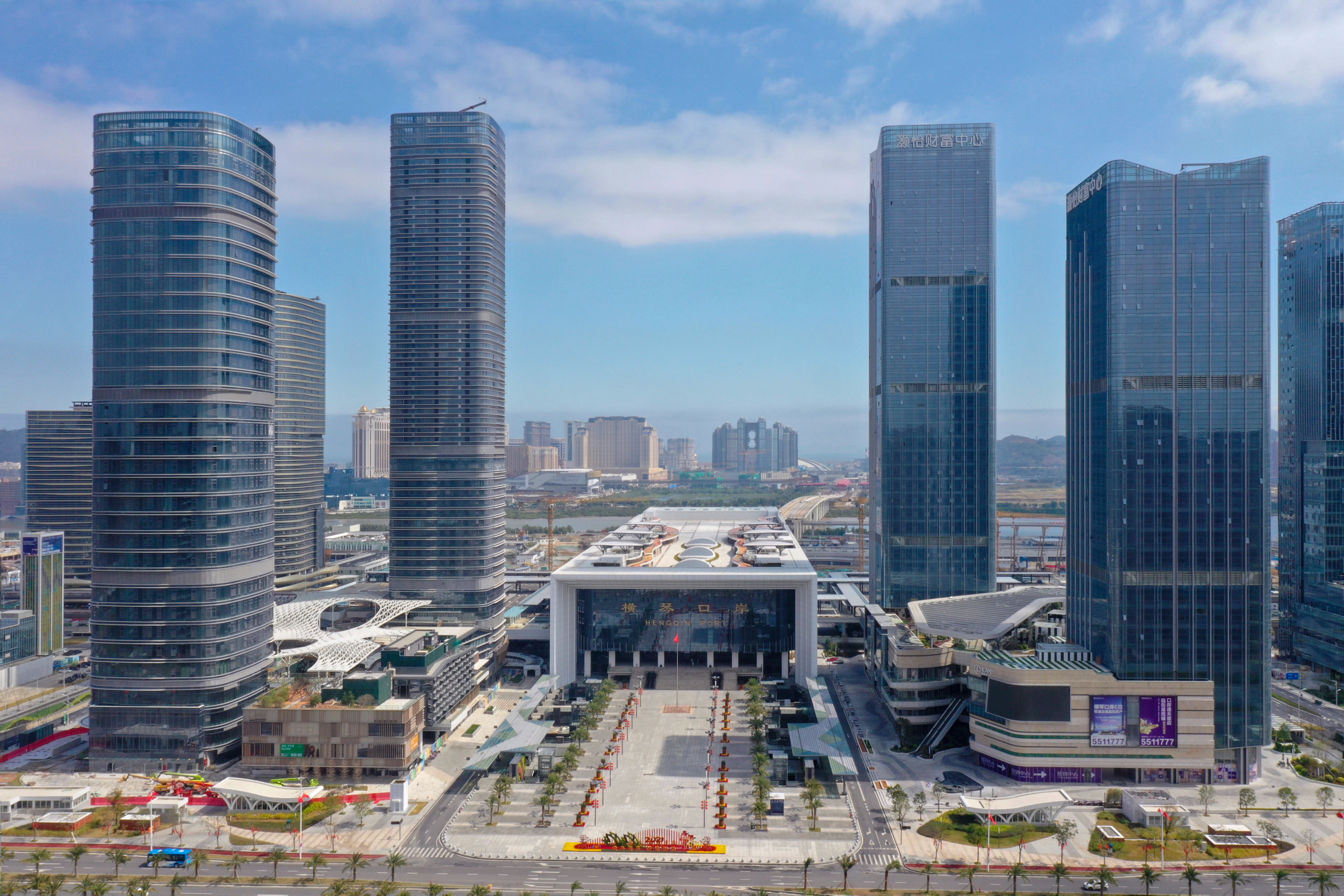
- Hengqin Port on the Zhuhai side (2021), facing the Lotus Bridge and Macau.

Location
- Country: China
- Location: Hengqin, Zhuhai, Guangdong
- Coordinates: 22.14056°N 113.54444°E

Details
- Opened: August 18, 2020
- Operated by: National Immigration Administration
- Owned by: Government of the People's Republic of China

Statistics
- Passenger traffic: 80 million (design capacity)

Website
- Zhuhai Government

Macau Port Area of Hengqin Port
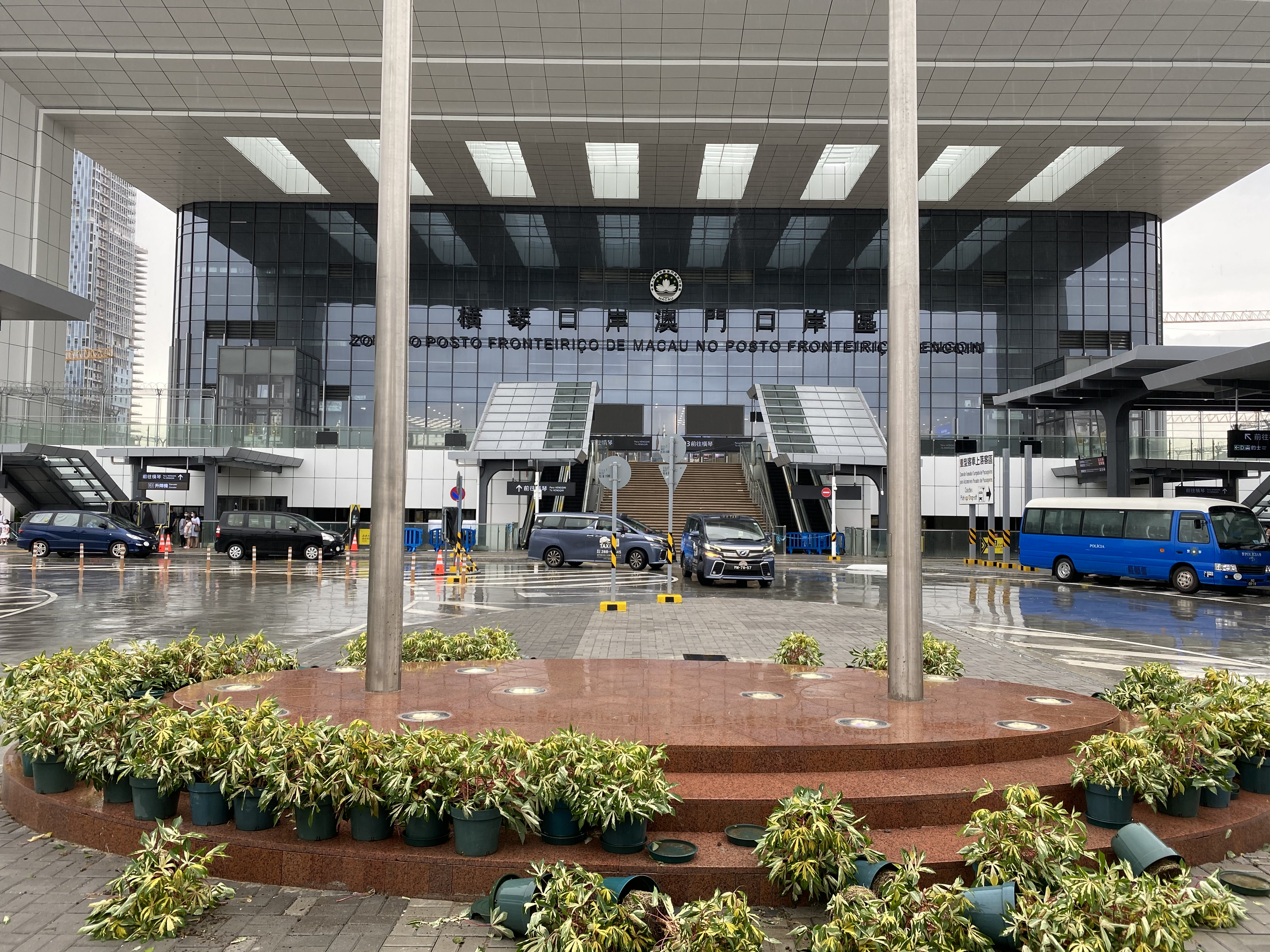
- Macau Port Area within Hengqin Port (2020), under Macau jurisdiction.

Location
- Country: Macau SAR (leased area in Zhuhai, China)
- Location: Hengqin Island (leased to Macau SAR)
- Coordinates: 22.13965°N 113.54522°E

Details
- Opened: August 18, 2020
- Operated by: Public Security Police Force; Macau Customs
- Owned by: Government of Macau SAR

Website
- Macau Security Forces

Hengqin Port (Chinese: 横琴口岸) is a land border checkpoint located in Hengqin, Zhuhai, Guangdong Province, China, connecting mainland China with the Macau Special Administrative Region. Opened on 18 August 2020, it replaces the former Lotus Bridge crossing as the main land port between Zhuhai and Macau in the western area of the territory.

The port consists of two functional sections: the Zhuhai-side checkpoint, operated by Chinese authorities, and the Macau Port Area of Hengqin Port (Chinese: 橫琴口岸澳門口岸區), which is leased to Macau and administered under Macau law until 2049. This arrangement allows for streamlined "joint inspection and one-stop customs clearance", facilitating rapid cross-border travel between the two jurisdictions.

Hengqin Port operates 24 hours a day and is capable of handling up to 80 million passenger trips annually, making it one of the busiest border crossings in the Greater Bay Area. The port has been connected to the Hengqin line of the Macau LRT since November 2024.

== History ==
=== Early Era (1999–2007) ===
The original Hengqin land port began construction in June 1999 and officially opened on 28 March 2000, coinciding with the opening of the Lotus Bridge linking Zhuhai and Macau. However, structural issues forced a temporary closure on 17 September 2005, ceasing passenger operations (while allowing vehicle traffic), with the checkpoint later reopening on 1 May 2007 after rebuilding.

=== 24-Hour Operation & Temporary Facilities (2014–2019) ===
On 18 December 2014, the port transitioned to 24-hour operation, supported by a temporary immigration building and paving the way for a permanent integrated checkpoint complex. It was during this period that planning began for a new facility featuring "co-located inspection, single clearance" (joint customs and immigration) and a modern integrated transport hub.

=== New Integrated Port & Macau Leased Area (2020) ===
Following approval by the NPC Standing Committee, the rebuilt Macau Port Area and Lotus Bridge section were leased to Macau judicial jurisdiction until 19 December 2049. On 18 August 2020 at 15:00, the new integrated checkpoint building was officially opened; at the same time, the old Lotus Bridge-based crossings were closed and operations formally migrated to Hengqin Port's new Zhuhai and Macau sections.

=== Phase II & Transit Infrastructure (2021–2023) ===
In March 2021, planning commenced for the Hengqin station of the Macau Light Rapid Transit Hengqin Line directly beneath the Macau Port Area and connected to the University of Macau by a dedicated access bridge. By September 2021, Phase II construction introduced a joint customs lane for passenger vehicles, while on 26 October 2019 the NPC approved Macau's legal jurisdiction over the Port Area and associated extensions.

== Transport ==
Hengqin Port serves as a major intermodal hub for cross-border travel between Zhuhai and Macau. On the Zhuhai side, the port is connected to urban bus routes, taxis, and Zhuhai's extensive road network, including direct access to Hengqin Avenue and Lotus Bridge. The port is also within proximity to Zhuhai Airport Urban Rail Transit (Zhuhai Airport MRT Line), which links the area with Zhuhai Railway Station and the greater Pearl River Delta region.

On the Macau side, the Macau Port Area of Hengqin Port is currently served by shuttle buses and taxis, with Hengqin Station on the Hengqin line of the Macau Light Rapid Transit is directly beneath the Macau Port Area. It provide a seamless underground connection to the University of Macau, as well as onward access to Taipa and Cotai via the LRT network.

Additionally, the port is integrated with pedestrian skybridges and cross-border vehicular inspection lanes for private vehicles and commercial transport. Dedicated lanes for "cooperative customs inspection" allow for high-efficiency clearance under the "joint inspection, one-stop release" mechanism.
