= Hengqin railway station =

PRDIR Zhuji ICR station

Hengqin 橫琴
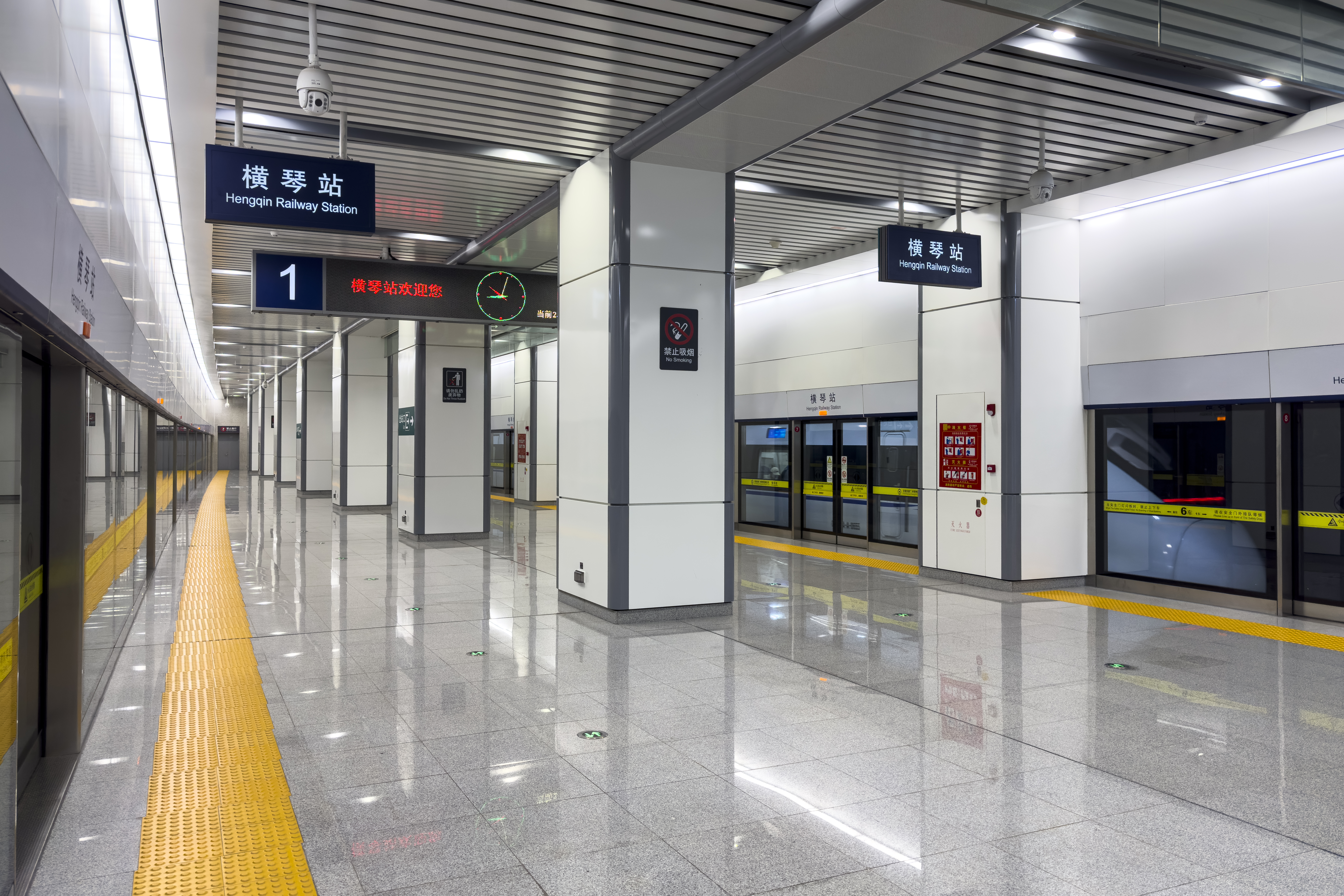

Chinese name
- Chinese: 橫琴站
Transcriptions
Standard Mandarin
- Hanyu Pinyin: Héngqín Zhàn
Yue: Cantonese
- Jyutping: waang4 kam4 zaam6

General information
- Other names: Montanha
- Coordinates: 22°8′26.095″N 113°32′22.560″E
- Operated by: CR Guangzhou
- Line: Zhuhai–Zhuhai Airport intercity railway
- Platforms: 4 (side platforms)
- Connections: Hengqin

Construction
- Structure type: Underground

Other information
- Station code: HQA (Pinyin: HQI, Numerical: 65976)

History
- Opened: 18 August 2020; 5 years ago

Services
Preceding station	Pearl River Delta Metropolitan Region Intercity Railway	Following station
Shizimen towards Zhuhai	Zhuhai–Zhuhai Airport intercity railway	Zhuhai Changlong towards Zhuhai Airport
Across the mainland China–Macao border
Preceding station	Macau Light Rapid Transit	Following station
Lotus Terminus	Hengqin line transfer at Hengqin	Terminus
Location

Hengqin station is an underground station on the Zhuhai–Zhuhai Airport intercity railway. It is located under Ring Island Road in the Guangdong–Macao In-Depth Cooperation Zone in Hengqin. The station opened on 18 August 2020.

== Station layout ==
The station is a two-floor underground cut-and-cover station. The main body of the station is 760 metres (2,490 ft) long and 44 metres (144 ft) wide, with 29 exits and 7 pavilions. It is the largest station in Phase 1 of the Zhuji ICR, and the second largest underground railway station in mainland China after Futian station at the time of its completion.

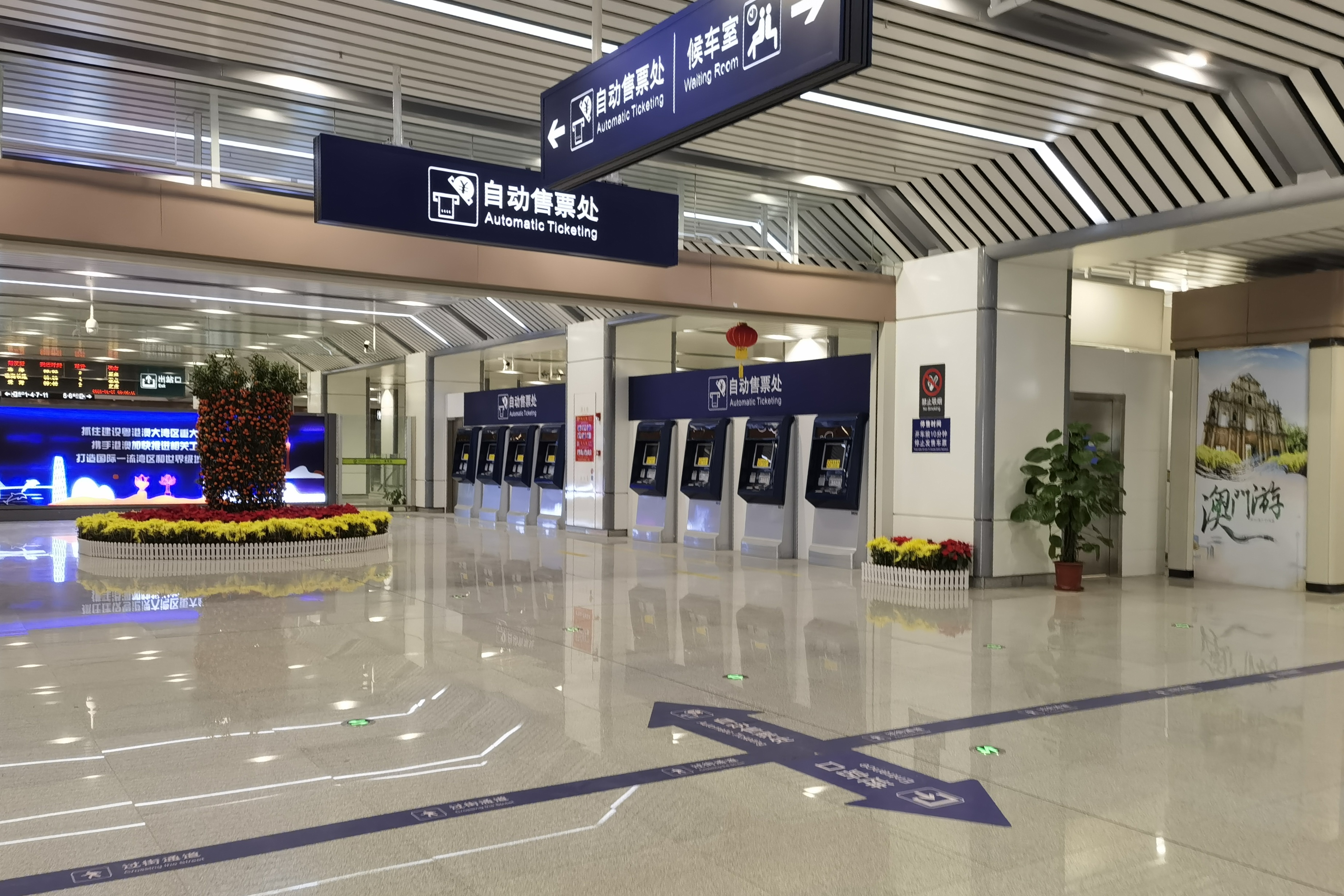
Ticket machines

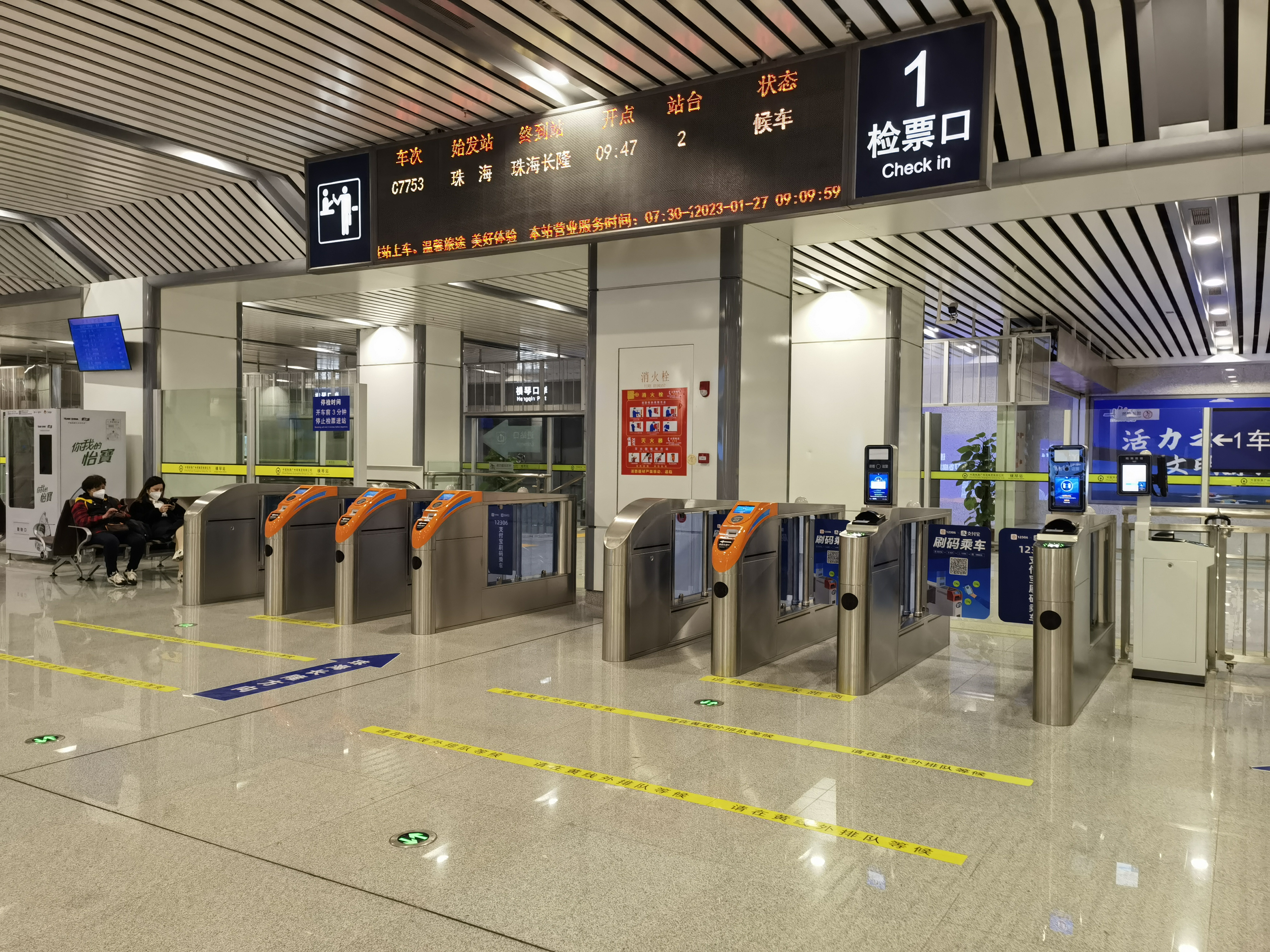
Check-in Gate 1

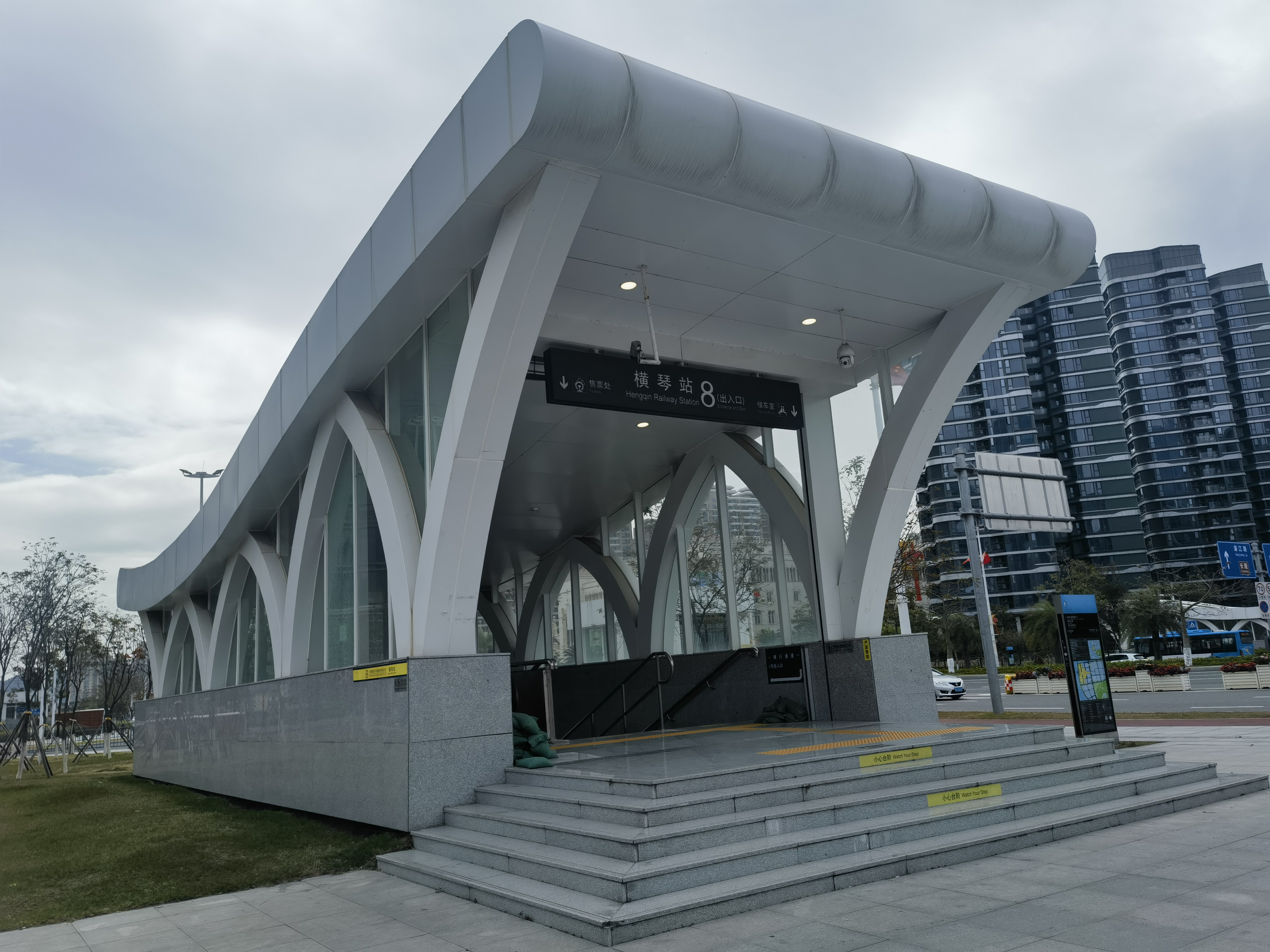
Exit 8

== History ==
The station was topped out on 26 September 2016, and opened on 18 August 2020, with the opening of the Zhuji ICR.

As the Hengqin IDCZ has implemented closed-border operations, this station has added a second customs processing channel and started operations on 1 March 2024.

== Transportation ==
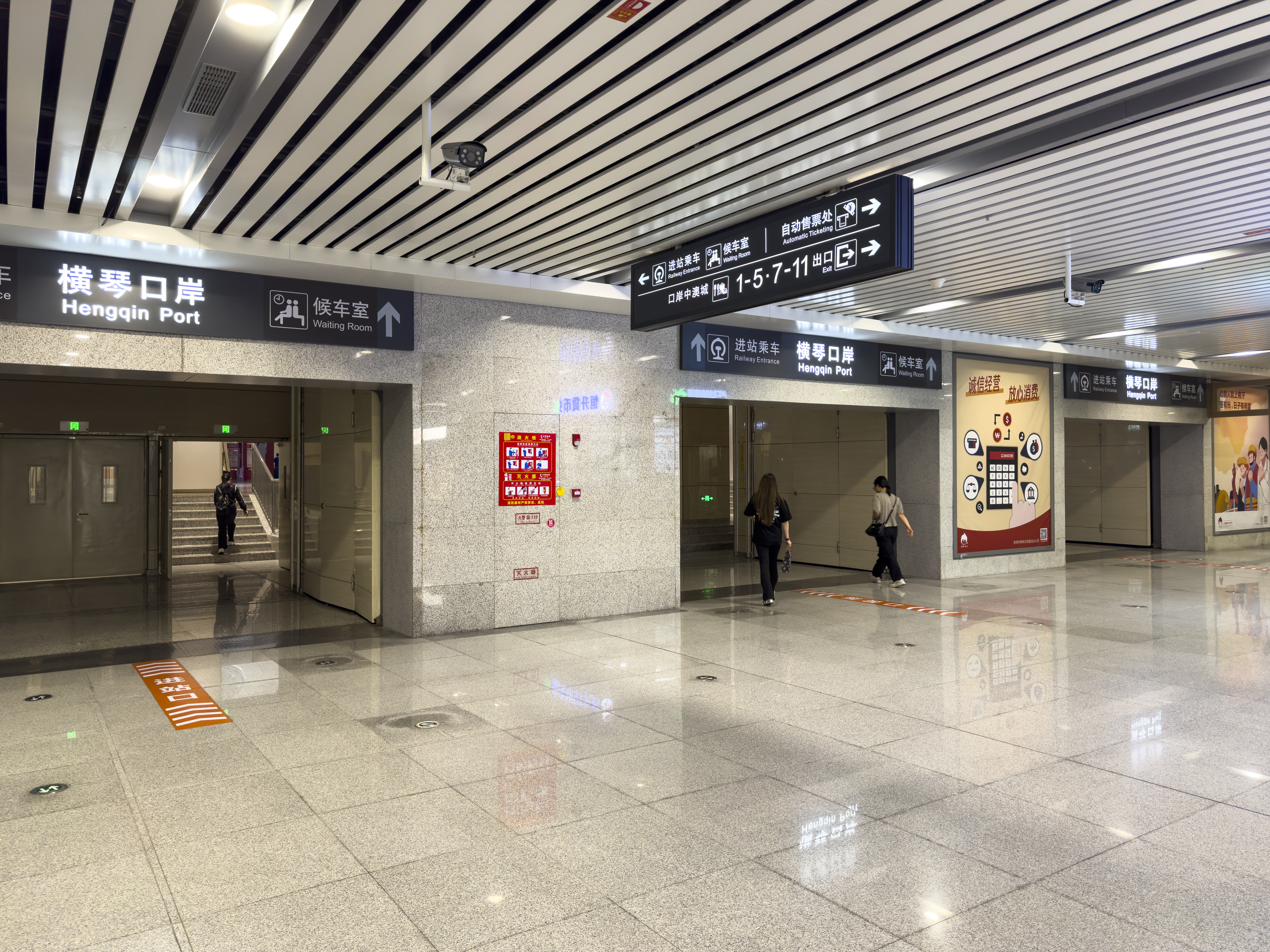
Station exit to the Hengqin Port

Near the station is the Hengqin Port Bus Station, providing passengers with access to various locations throughout Zhuhai.

The station is connected to the new passenger inspection area of the Hengqin Port through an underground passage. Passengers can transfer to the Hengqin Line of the Macau LRT after exiting the station and completing customs clearance at the Hengqin Port.
