= Hengqin station (Macau Light Rapid Transit) =

Light rail station in Macau

Hengqin 橫琴站
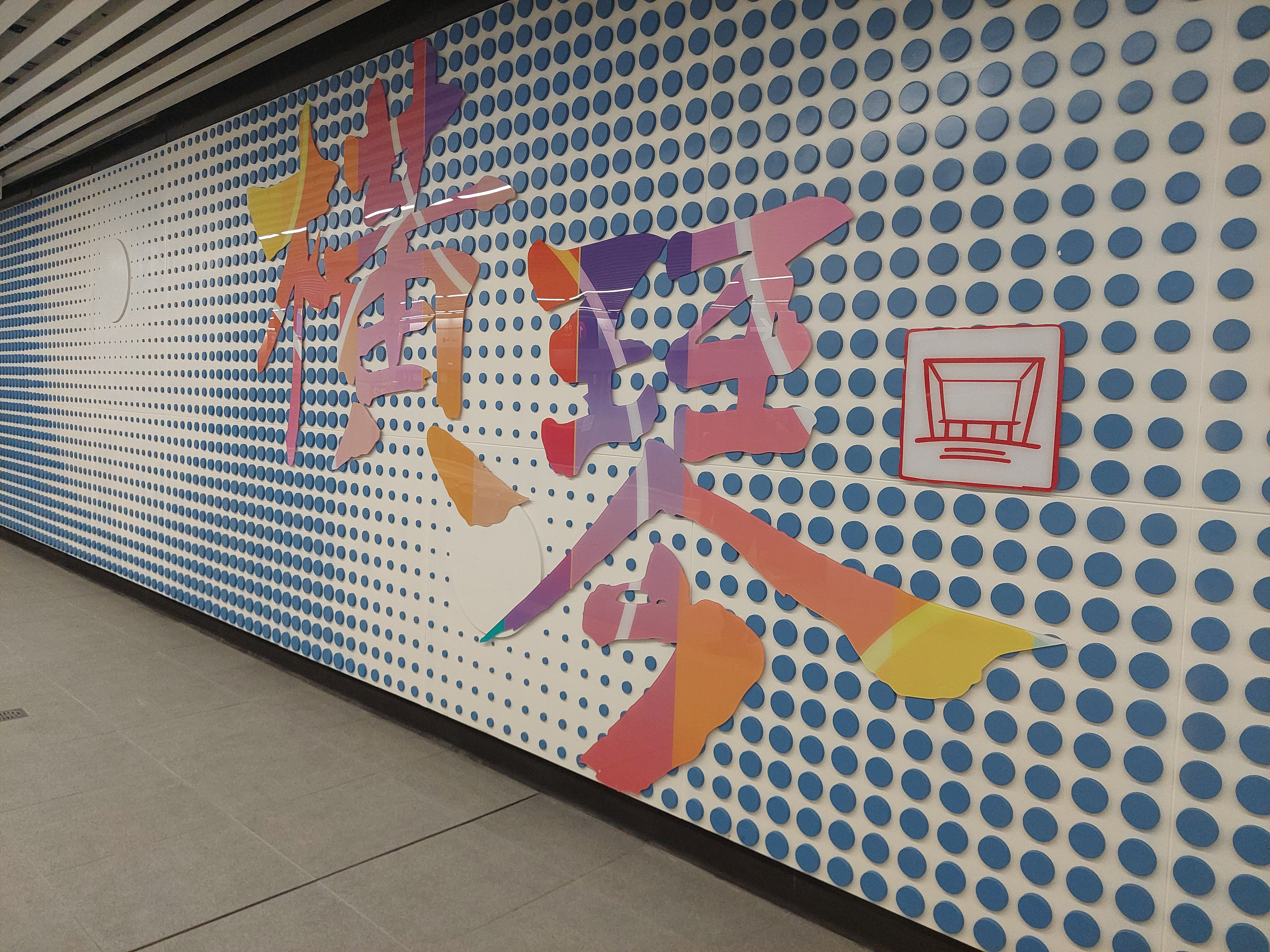
- Stylized platform sign

General information
- Location: Macao Port Zone of Hengqin Port
- Coordinates: 22.1406595°N 113.5449167°E
- Line: Hengqin
- Platforms: 1 side platform
- Connections: Hengqin: Zhuji; Hengqin Macau Port Transportation Hub

Construction
- Structure type: Underground

Other information
- Station code: HQ (formerly HE2 )

History
- Opened: 2 December 2024

Services
Preceding station	Macau Light Rapid Transit	Following station
Lotus Terminus	Hengqin line	Terminus
Across the mainland China–Macao border
Preceding station	Pearl River Delta Metropolitan Region Intercity Railway	Following station
Shizimen towards Zhuhai	Zhuhai–Zhuhai Airport intercity railway transfer at Hengqin	Zhuhai Changlong towards Zhuhai Airport
Location

Hengqin station (Chinese: 橫琴站; Portuguese: Estação de Hengqin) is the terminus of the Hengqin Line of the Macau Light Rapid Transit. It is located below the Macao Port Area of Hengqin Port serving as a border crossing into Hengqin, Zhuhai in mainland China. It is the second underground station of the Macau Light Rapid Transit System. Construction of the station officially started on 18 March 2021 leading to the start of revenue service on 2 December 2024.

== Station ==
=== Layout ===
3	Departure Hall	Customs and border inspection station towards Zhuhai
2	Transportation Hub platform	Bus terminus, taxi stand, tourist coach, cross-border coach, hotel and casino shuttle bus, and vehicle pick-up and drop-off area
Ground Floor	Arrival Hall	Customs and border inspection station towards towards Macau, self-service vending machines, self-service machines, toilets, station entrances and exits
Basement 1	Ticketing Hall	Customer service booth, self-service ticket machine, toilet
Basement 2
Basement 2	Platform 1	Hengqin to Lotus
Basement 2	Side platform, doors will open on the left
Basement 2		Hengqin Siding track (no platform)

=== Station lobby ===
The station is equipped with automatic ticket machines and gate machines, as well as a customer service center, toilets and other facilities.

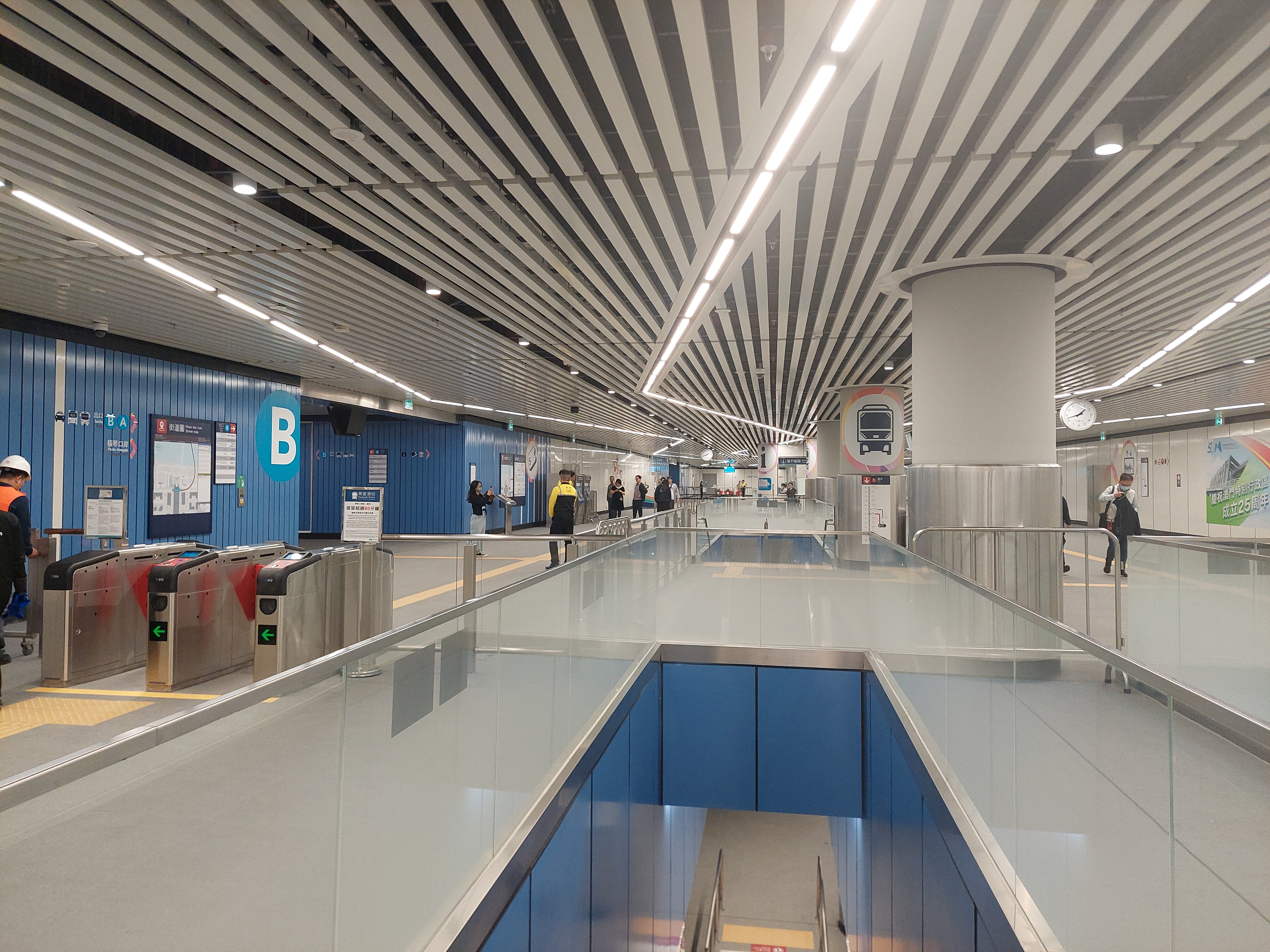
Station concourse level

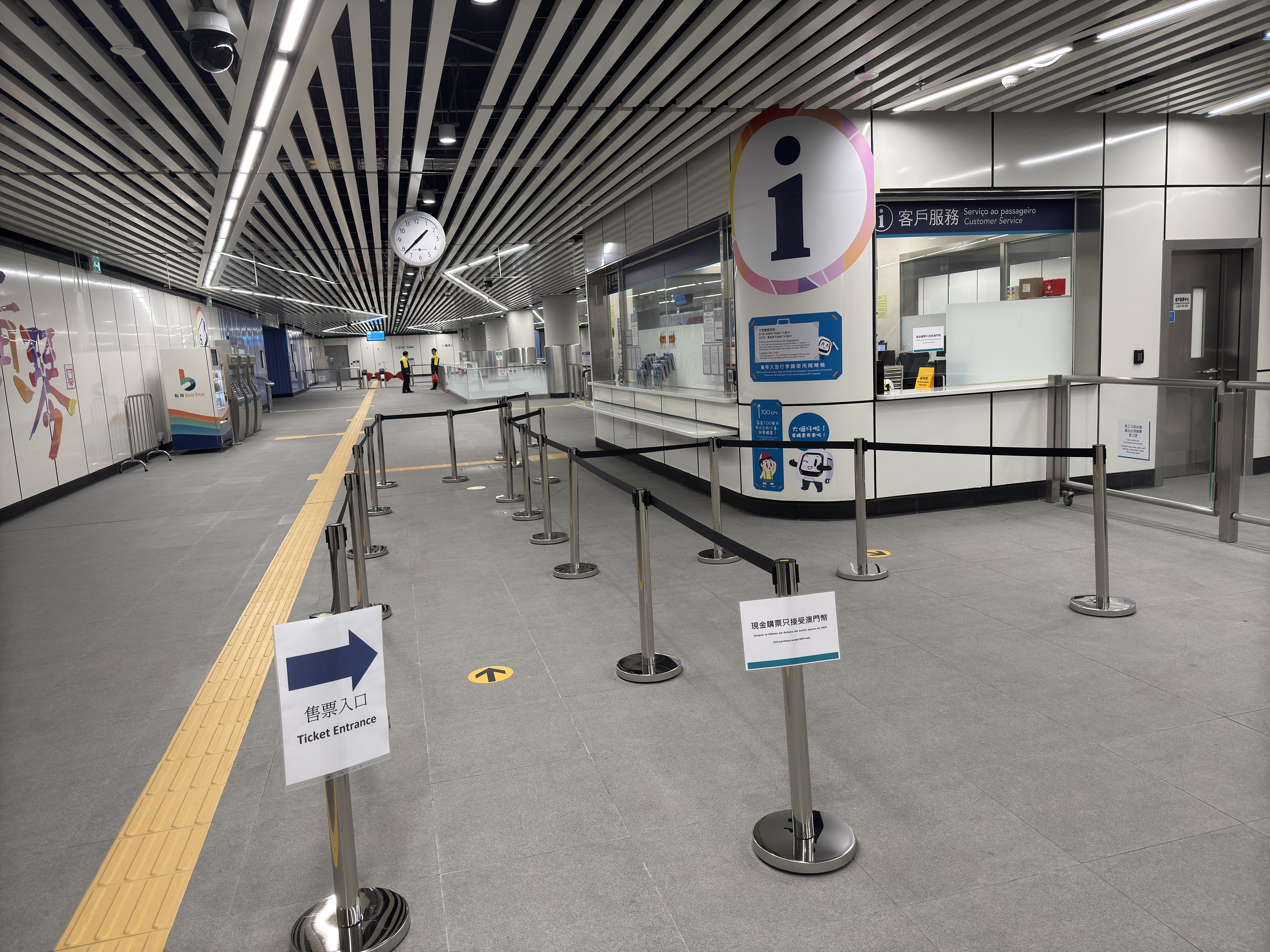
Information booth

=== Platform ===
As the Hengqin Line only has a single-track, this station contains just one side platform for passengers to board and alight. After arriving at the station, the train departs from the station in the opposite direction towards Lotus station. There is an offside tunnel on the north side of the platform which serves as a siding track.

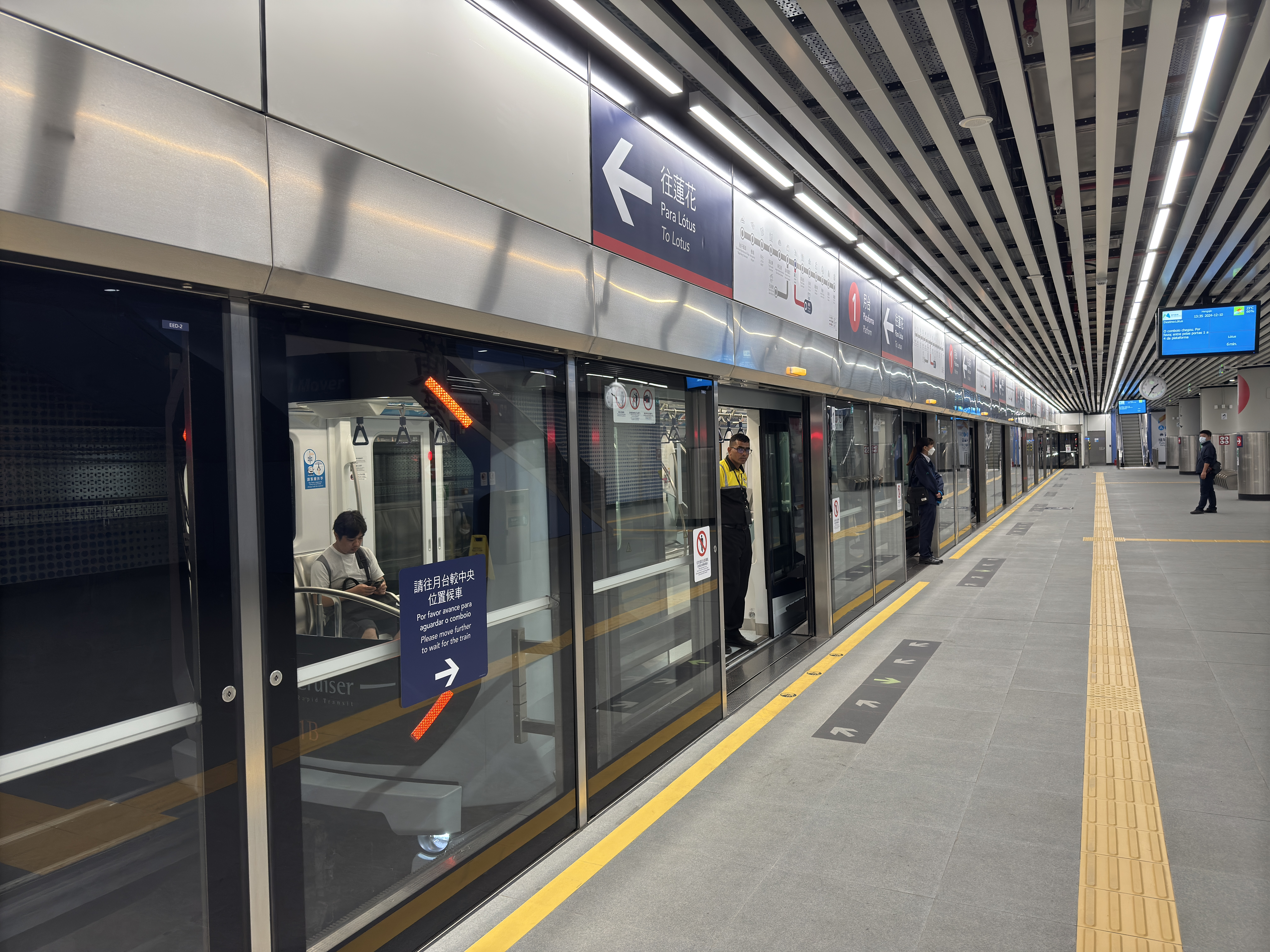
Platform 1

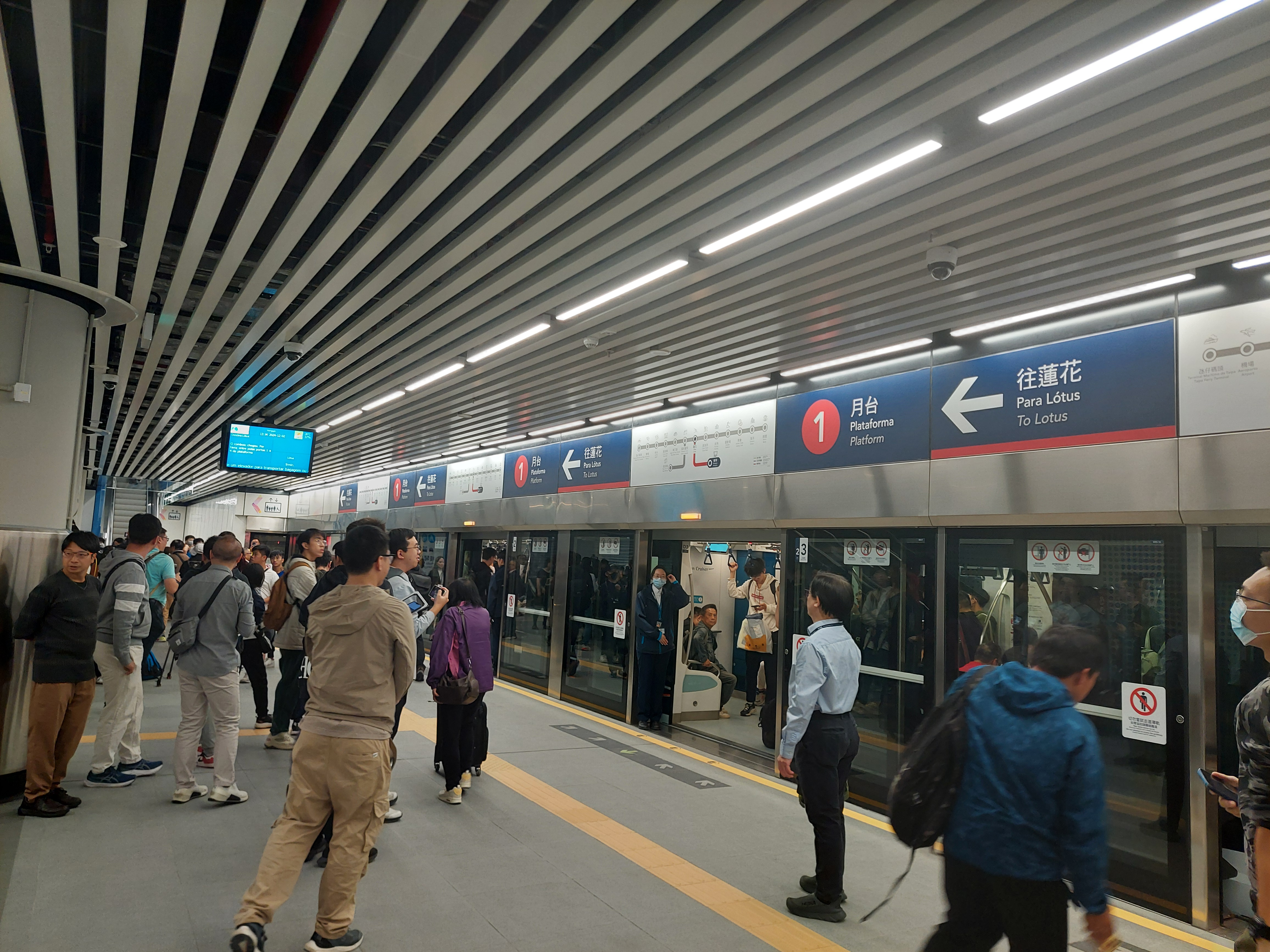
Platform 1

=== Entrance and Exit ===
Both entrances and exits are located at the Macau Arrival Hall of the Hengqin Port. There is also a designated route to connect to China Railway High-speed's Hengqin station that serves the Zhuhai–Zhuhai Airport intercity railway.

Passengers arriving at this station and heading to the Hengqin Port need to take an elevator or escalator at Exit A to the Macau Departure Hall on Level U3. If passengers enter the station via the Macau Arrival Hall (Level U1) and Entrance B, they can take the escalator or elevator down one level to reach the ticket hall of the station. There is no direct connection and transfer with the Zhuhai–Zhuhai Airport intercity railway which is located in a separate building.

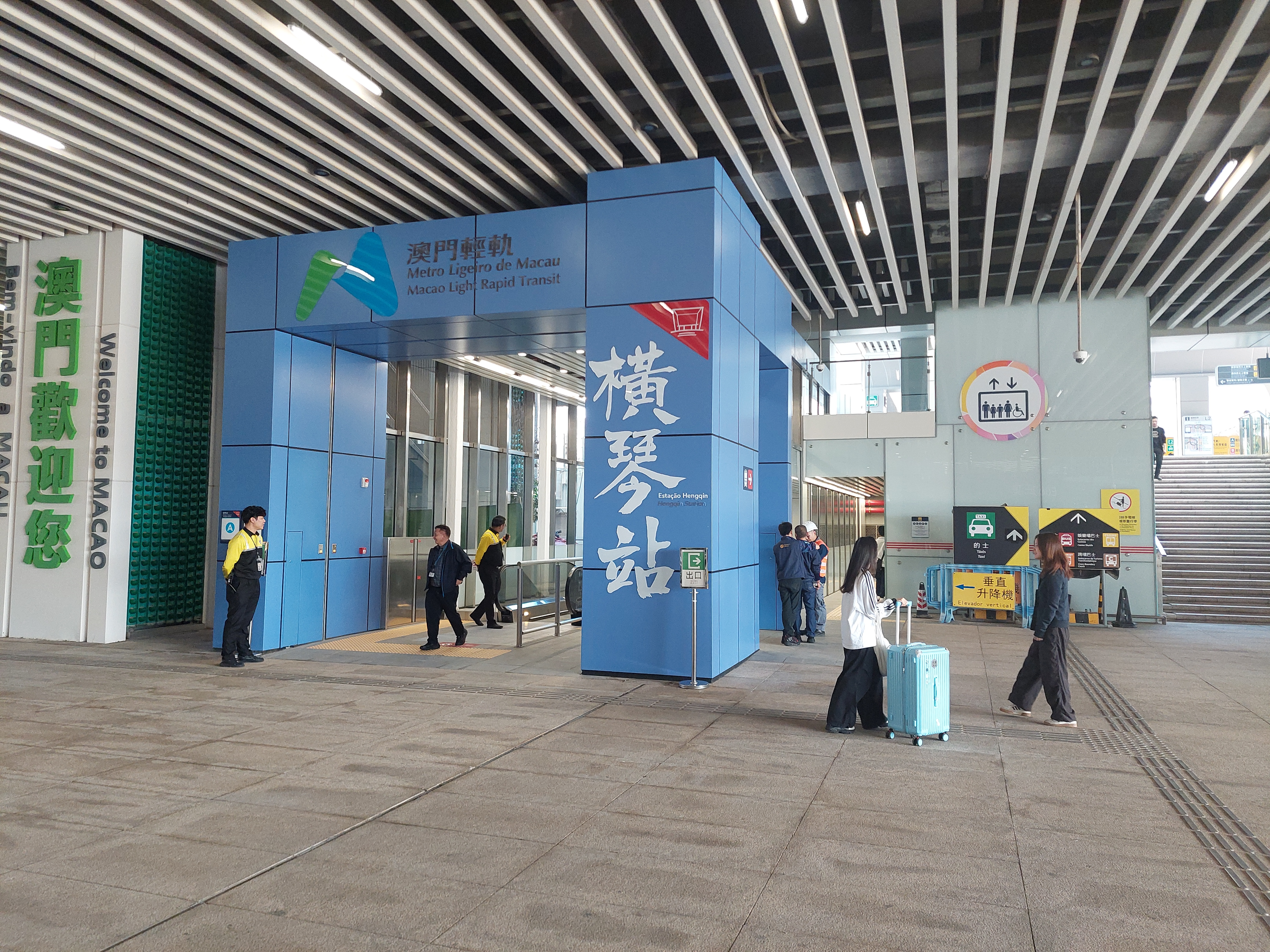

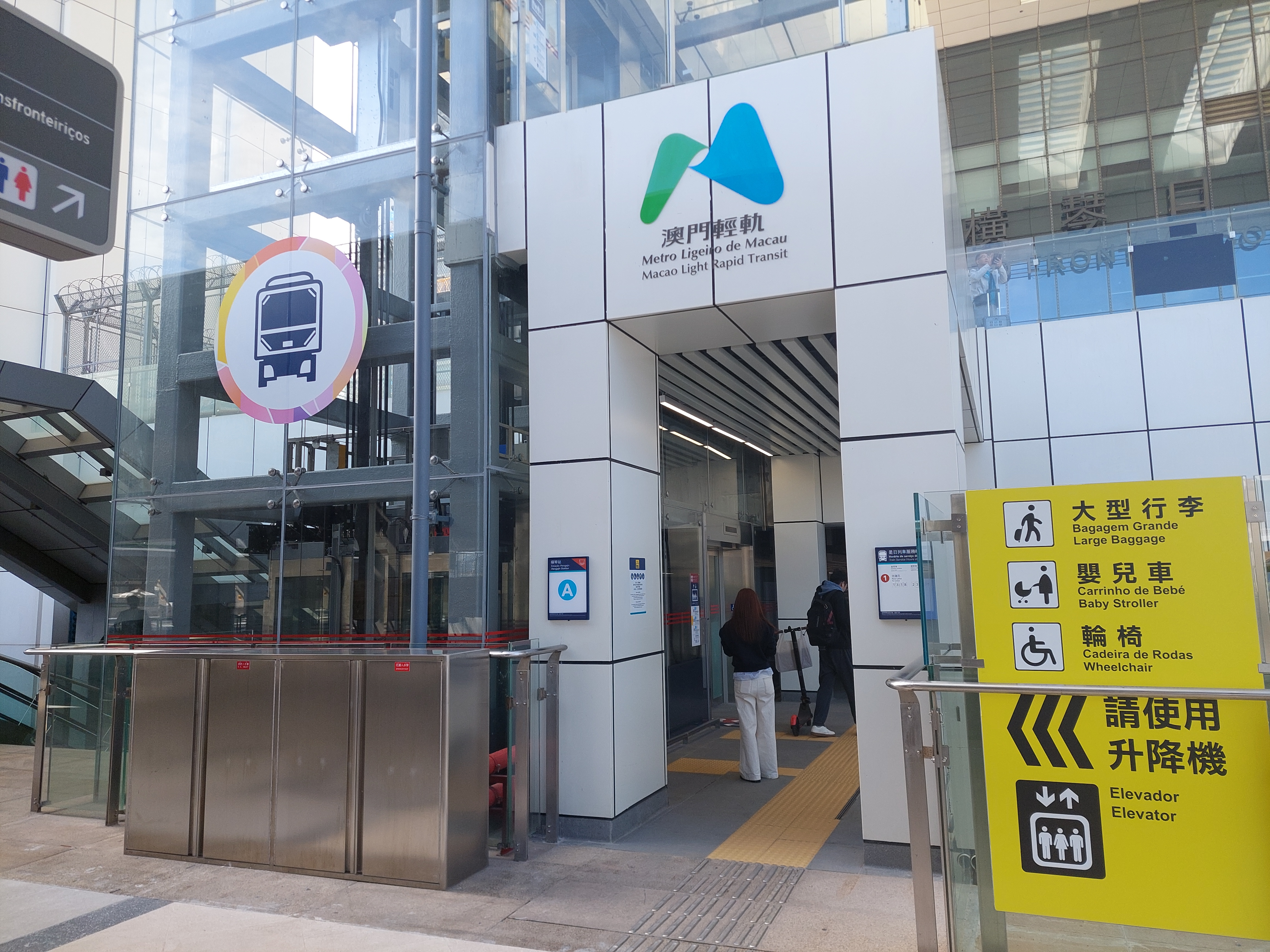

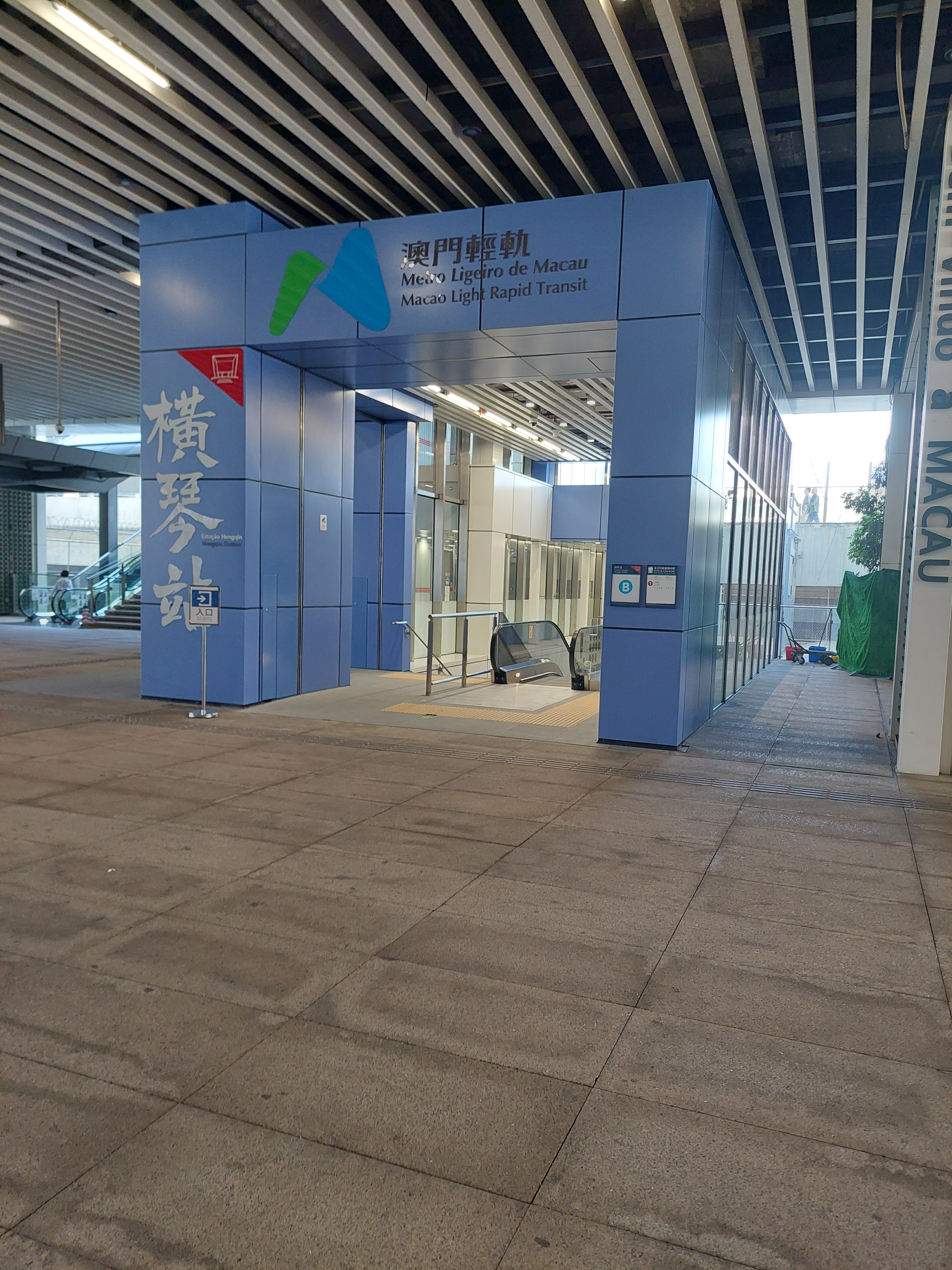

== Station Area ==
- Hengqin Port
- Bridge to the University of Macau (Campus is located in Hengqin on land leased to the Macau SAR)

== Transportation ==
=== Macau public buses ===
The T560 Macau-Hengqin Frontier Post bus station serves the following lines: 25B, 25BS, 50, 102X, 701X, 701XS, N6

=== Transportation Hub Platform ===
Located on the second floor of the Macau Port Area of Hengqin Port, it includes a bus terminal, taxi stand, tourist bus station, and cross-border bus station.

== History ==
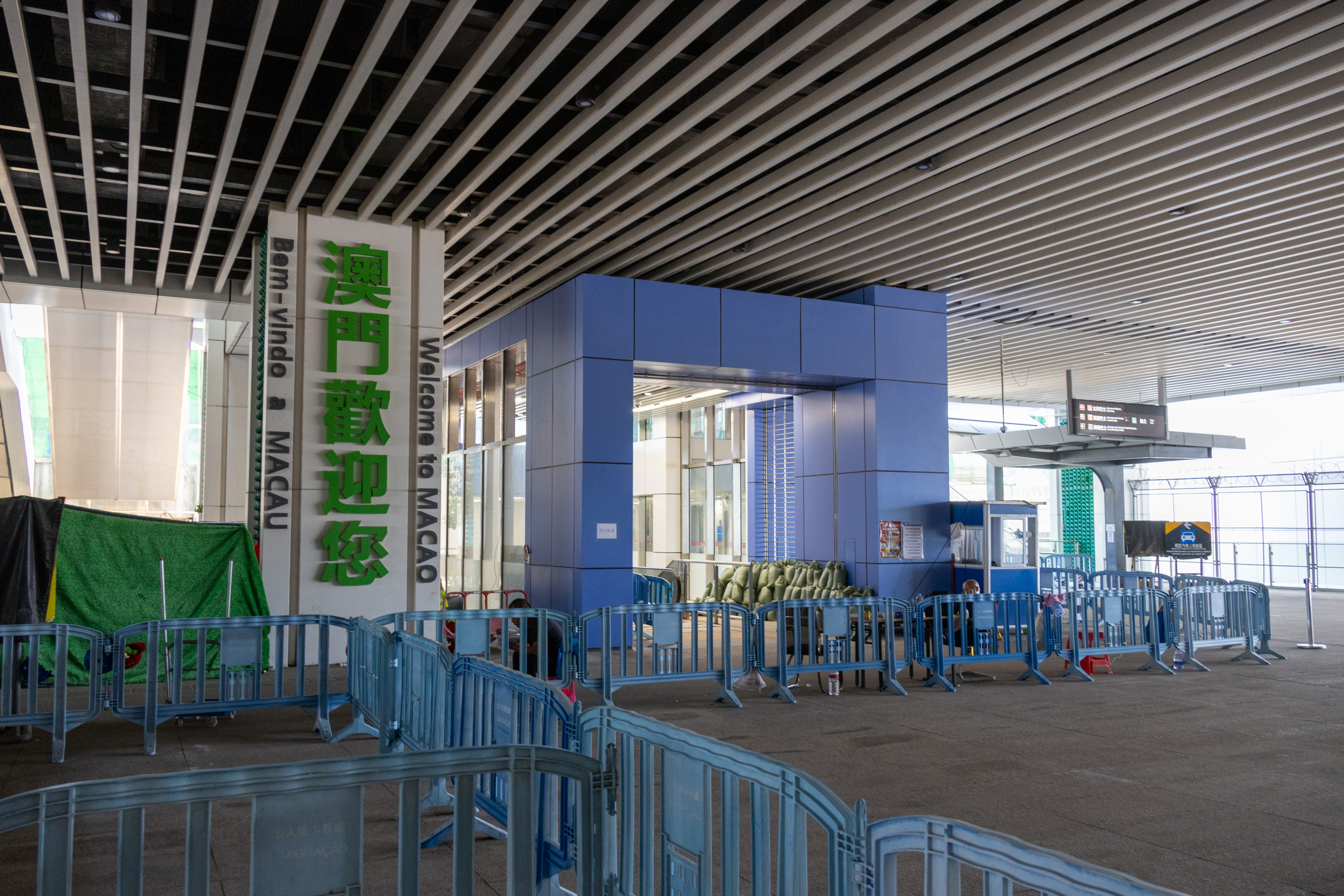
Exit A under construction in August 2024

On 18 March 2021, the construction of the Hengqin Line extension officially started, with the construction of the Hengqin station scheduled for later that year.

In September 2021, the Construction and Development Office announced the "Macau-Hengqin Cross-Border Construction Project", which included the Hengqin station to be built in an underground space of the Hengqin Port (Macau Port Area). The entire line would be a single line track with 4-car trains making the journey in both directions. Officials planned to run 9 trains per hour, with the most frequent services running every 6.5 minutes, with a projected maximum passenger capacity of 8,568 people per hour. At that time, the station was carrying out pipeline relocation work, geological reinforcement of the open-cut section, and underground continuous wall construction; while the excavation of the entrance and exit foundation pit and the support structure were being constructed as well.

On 25 November 2022, the underground tunnel officially was complete with a ceremony also held on the Macau project site that same day. The structural work of the station, together with the Lotus station on the Macau side, the open-cut tunnel section and the viaduct section, was about 78% complete, while the overall civil engineering was only 60% complete. The rolling stock and driving systems were being installed and tested.

On 30 September 2024, the construction of the Hengqin line was officially completed and was handed over to the Macao Light Rapid Transit Corporation, Ltd. for testing before opening to the public.

On 2 December 2024, services began on the Hengqin Line and this station was officially opened.

== Legal status ==
On 26 October 2019, the Standing Committee of the National People's Congress approved a lease of the rebuilt Macau Port Area of the Hengqin Port, together with the Lotus Bridge, to Macau and placed it under the jurisdiction of Macau law. The lease began upon the opening of the rebuilt port and lasting until 19 December 2049, and may be renewed upon approval by the National People's Congress.

On 13 January 2020, the Executive Council of the Macau SAR outlined the map of the Macau Port Area of the Hengqin Port including legal entry and exit points of the Macao Special Administrative Region, and to specify the relevant extension areas, including the reserved space for the construction of this station.

Following the approval of relevant bills by the State Council of the People's Republic of China and the Legislative Assembly of Macau, the reserved space for the light rail extension was officially transferred over to the Macau SAR on 1 April 2024, subjecting it to Macau law.
