= Loftus station =

Loftus station may refer to:

- Loftus railway station, Sydney, Australia
- Loftus railway station, Yorkshire, England

== See also ==
- Lotus station, Macau
