= Wanzai, Small Hengqin and Great Hengqin islands =

Wanzai, Small Hengqin and Great Hengqin islands 灣仔、小橫琴島和大橫琴島 Wānzǎi、Xiǎohéngqín Dǎo Hé Dàhéngqín Dǎo Lapa, Dom João e Montanha
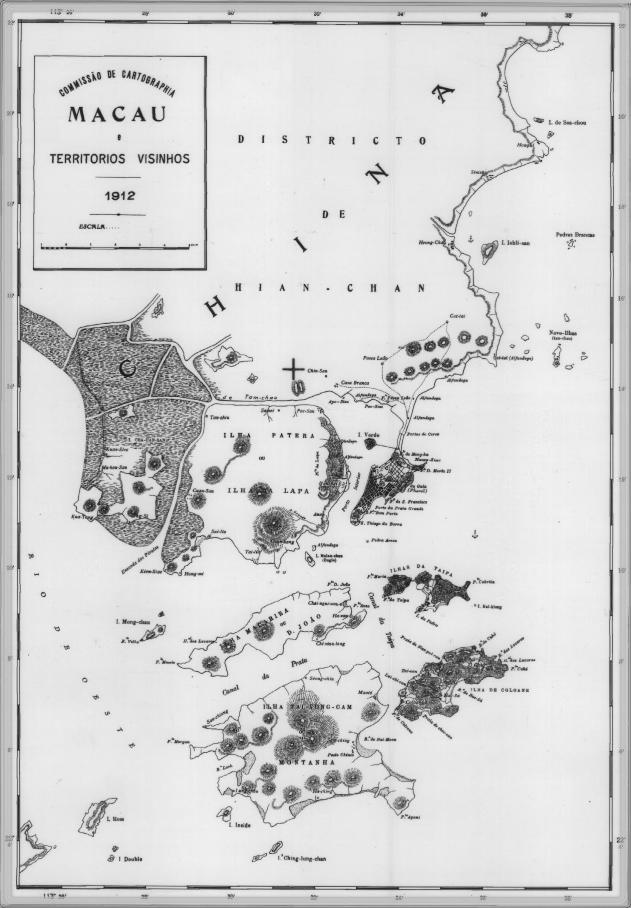
- Interactive map of Wanzai, Small Hengqin and Great Hengqin islands
- Region: Zhuhai / Macau (leased lands)
- Time zone: UTC+8 (China Standard / Macau Standard)
- Postal code: 519031

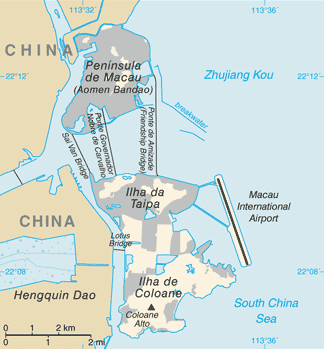
Current map of the Macau Special Administrative Region. To the west are the island of Hengqin and the peninsula of Wanzai.

Wanzai, Small Hengqin and Great Hengqin (Portuguese names: Lapa, Dom João and Montanha) are three islands located to the west of the Macau Peninsula and the Macau islands of Taipa and Coloane that were under Portuguese influence. They were inhabited by a small Chinese population in its early history.

Two of them have since been combined via land reclamation to form the current Hengqin island.

The water channels between Small Hengqin, Great Hengqin, Taipa, and Coloane used to be known as Shizimen Channel (literally "cross gate") in Chinese, due to the plus sign-shaped arrangement of water channels between the four islands. A number of maritime battle occurred over the area in the past, but the water channel now disappeared due to land reclamation connecting Small Hengqin with Great Hengqin and connecting Taipa with Coloane. However the name "Shizimen" is still retained as a district name on the merged Hengqin island.

== History ==
In some historical registers, the Portuguese presence on the islands dates back to the end of the 17th century when a group of missionaries established themselves on this island.

According to historical records, the Portuguese presence on the island of Lapa dates back to 1645, when a mandarin from Canton (Guangzhou) authorised the burial of the Jesuit priest João Rodrigues in recognition of his service. Augustinian and Dominican missionaries also settled on this island, which appears in some ancient maps under the name of Patera Island, whose etymology is "Island of the priests" (D. João was called "Macarira", as seen in the 1912 map above). The exact date of abandonment of these facilities is not clear, but they were mentioned in a letter addressed to the government of Goa, dated 1764.

During the 19th century, Portuguese missionaries also began to populate and evangelise the other two islands. The Macau government also began to collect taxes from the populations of these three islands in exchange for protection as these islands were not protected by Chinese soldiers. The Portuguese built a leper colony on the island of Dom João and some schools to educate the few Chinese residents on the islands.

Followed by the Japanese invasion of China in 1938, the Portuguese officially occupied these three islands, with an excuse to better protect Portuguese missionaries residing there. In 1941, the Japanese Army threatened the Portuguese troops to force abandonment of these sparsely populated islands. Consequently, these islands were occupied by Japan. At the end of World War II, China was able to reoccupy the three islands.

Today, they are an incorporation of the Special Economic Zone of Zhuhai in Guangdong. The islands of Dom João and Montanha are now connected by an embankment that joins the two islands. This island was given the Chinese name, Hengqin. The Lotus Bridge makes the connection between Hengqin of Guangdong province and Cotai of Macau Special Administrative Region. The island of Lapa, established from land reclamation became a peninsula connected to the "mainland".

There are proposals to develop sparsely populated Hengqin into a tourist area with many hotels and luxury resorts. Hengqin has recently begun to experience major development with new residential areas.

Macau, due to lack of land, expressed their desire to annex the island of Hengqin to the Chinese Central Government, which was subsequently denied by Beijing. However, on September 1, 2005, the Central Government allowed entrepreneurs from Macau and Hong Kong to be exempt from the payment of some taxes and fees. The CPG also allowed greater flexibility in controlling migration to the island to promote investment.

== Former islands ==
=== Wanzai ===
Wanzai (traditional Chinese: 灣仔; simplified Chinese: 湾仔; Jyutping: waan1 zai2; pinyin: Wān Zǎi) was an island in the Xiangzhou District of the city of Zhuhai in Guangdong, China. It is adjacent to the Macau Peninsula of Macau. The Portuguese called the island Lapa.

Wanzai area in the east side of Ilha de Lapa was under Portuguese control from 1849 to 1887. It was located across the "Inner Harbour" (Qianshan Waterway) from Macau. In a 1700 map, the island has a defensive battery and manufacturing facility.

=== Small Hengqin ===
Small Hengqin (小橫琴島; 小横琴岛; siu2 waang4 kam4 dou2; Xiǎo Héngqín Dǎo) was a Chinese island adjacent to Taipa of Macau that has since and has become the northern part of Hengqin in Zhuhai, Guangdong. After land reclamation, only a swampy creek called "Central Creek" (中心溝; 中心沟) separates Small Hengqin from Great Hengqin.

The Portuguese called it Dom João.

=== Great Hengqin ===
Great Hengqin (大橫琴島; 大横琴岛; daai6 waang4 kam4 dou2; Dà Héngqín Dǎo) was a Chinese island adjacent to Coloane of Macau that has since has become the southern part of the combined Hengqin island.

The Portuguese called it Montanha.

== See also ==
- Macau
- History of Macau
- Hengqin
- Portuguese Empire
