= Lotus station =

Light rail station in Macau

Coordinates: 22.139475°N 113.559831°E

Lotus 蓮花
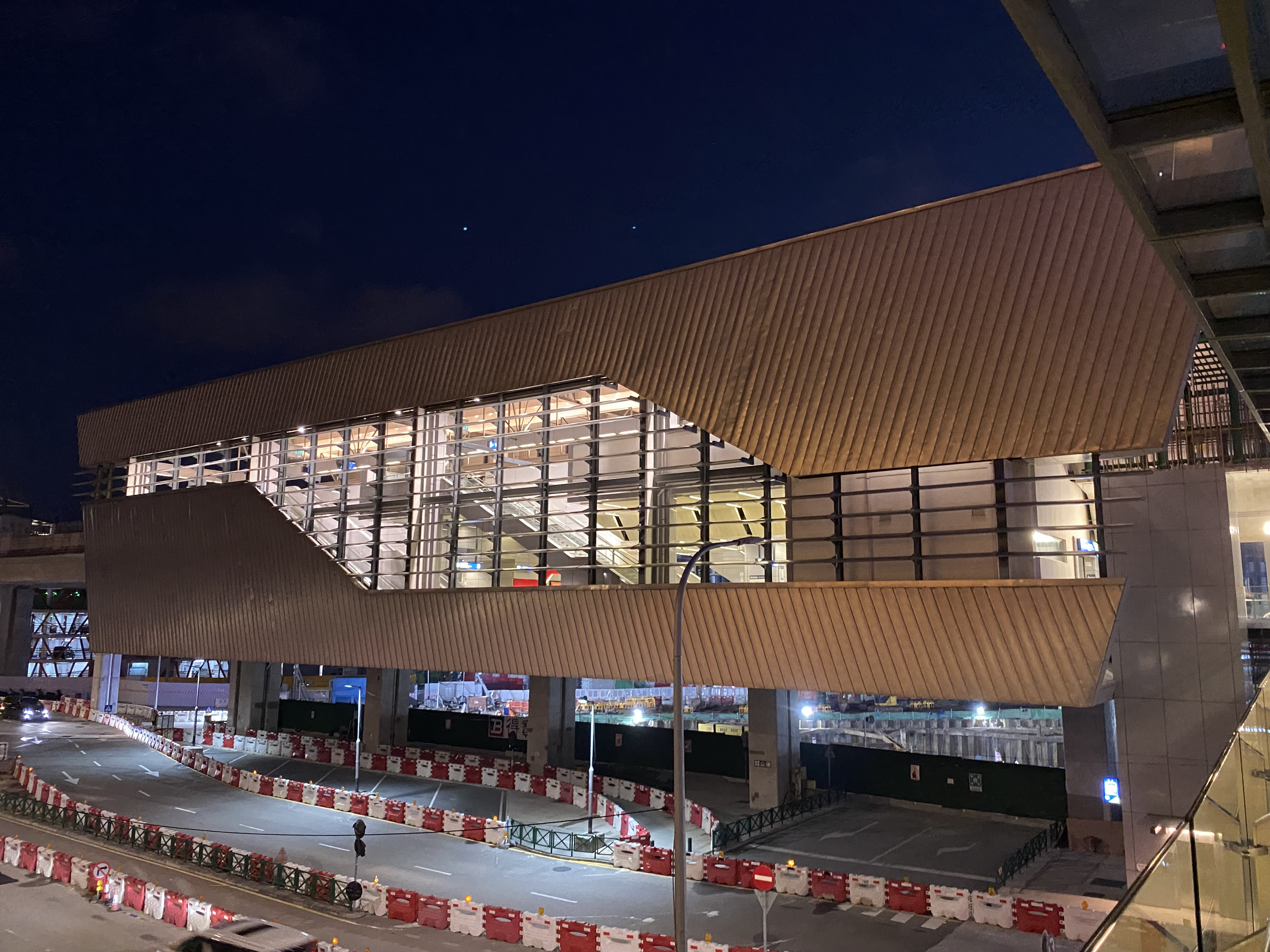
- Exterior of Lotus station

General information
- Location: Estrada Flor de Lótus, Cotai, Macau
- Line: Taipa Hengqin
- Platforms: 2 side platforms

Construction
- Structure type: Elevated

Other information
- Station code: ST18 HE1; LOC

History
- Opened: 10 December 2019
- Previous names: Lotus Checkpoint

Services
Preceding station	Macau Light Rapid Transit	Following station
Cotai West towards Barra	Taipa line	Union Hospital towards Taipa Ferry Terminal
Terminus	Hengqin line	Hengqin Terminus
Location

Lotus station
- Traditional Chinese: 蓮花站
- Jyutping: lin4 faa1 zaam6
Transcriptions
Yue: Cantonese
- Jyutping: lin4 faa1 zaam6

Portuguese name
- Portuguese: Estação do Lótus

Lotus station (Chinese: 蓮花站; Portuguese: Estação do Lótus) is a transfer station on the Taipa line and the Hengqin line of the Macau Light Rapid Transit in Cotai, Macau. It is an elevated station located at Estrada Flor de Lótus adjacent to Studio City, near the south end of the Cotai Strip.

== History ==
The station was originally named Lotus Checkpoint Station (Chinese: 蓮花口岸站; Portuguese: Estação do Posto Fronteiriço de Lótus) as it was adjacent to the now-defunct Cotai Frontier Post - which is also known as the Lotus Checkpoint. The frontier post was where immigration clearance took place for passengers travelling into and out of Macau through the Lótus Bridge between 2000 and 2020.

Construction for the station's steel superstructure formally began in August 2015. It opened on 10 December 2019 along with the rest of the Taipa line.

The Cotai Frontier Post was decommissioned on 18 August 2020, around 8 months after Lotus Checkpoint station commenced operation. It was replaced by the Macau Port Area of the Hengqin Port, located in Hengqin, Zhuhai but leased to Macau and managed under Macau law. Passengers could no longer access Macau immigration clearance facilities from the station on foot, and would now need to transfer in order to reach the new border crossing. In alignment to the closure and demolition of the frontier post, the station was officially renamed to its current name on 11 August 2023.

On 2 December 2024, the station became the terminus of Hengqin extension line, a 2.2km long shuttle service connecting the Macau Port Area of Hengqin Port with the LRT Taipa line. Passengers are able to transfer from Taipa line for Hengqin station at Lotus station. The entire Hengqin extension line, including the platforms at this station, are underground.

An earlier proposal for the Seac Pai Van line had sited the line's northern terminus at this station. The scheme was later amended and an infill Union Hospital station would be built between here and East Asian Games to act as the new line's connection point to the rest of the LRT system.

== Station layout ==
=== Taipa Line Platform ===
2/F	Side platform; doors open on the left
2/F	Platform 1	Taipa to Taipa Ferry Terminal (Union Hospital)
2/F	Platform 2	Taipa to Barra (Cotai West)
2/F	Side platform; doors open on the left
1/F	Tickets Level	Customer service, ticket machine and toilet, and Hengqin interchange platform
Ground Floor		Exits and entrances

== Entrances/Exits ==
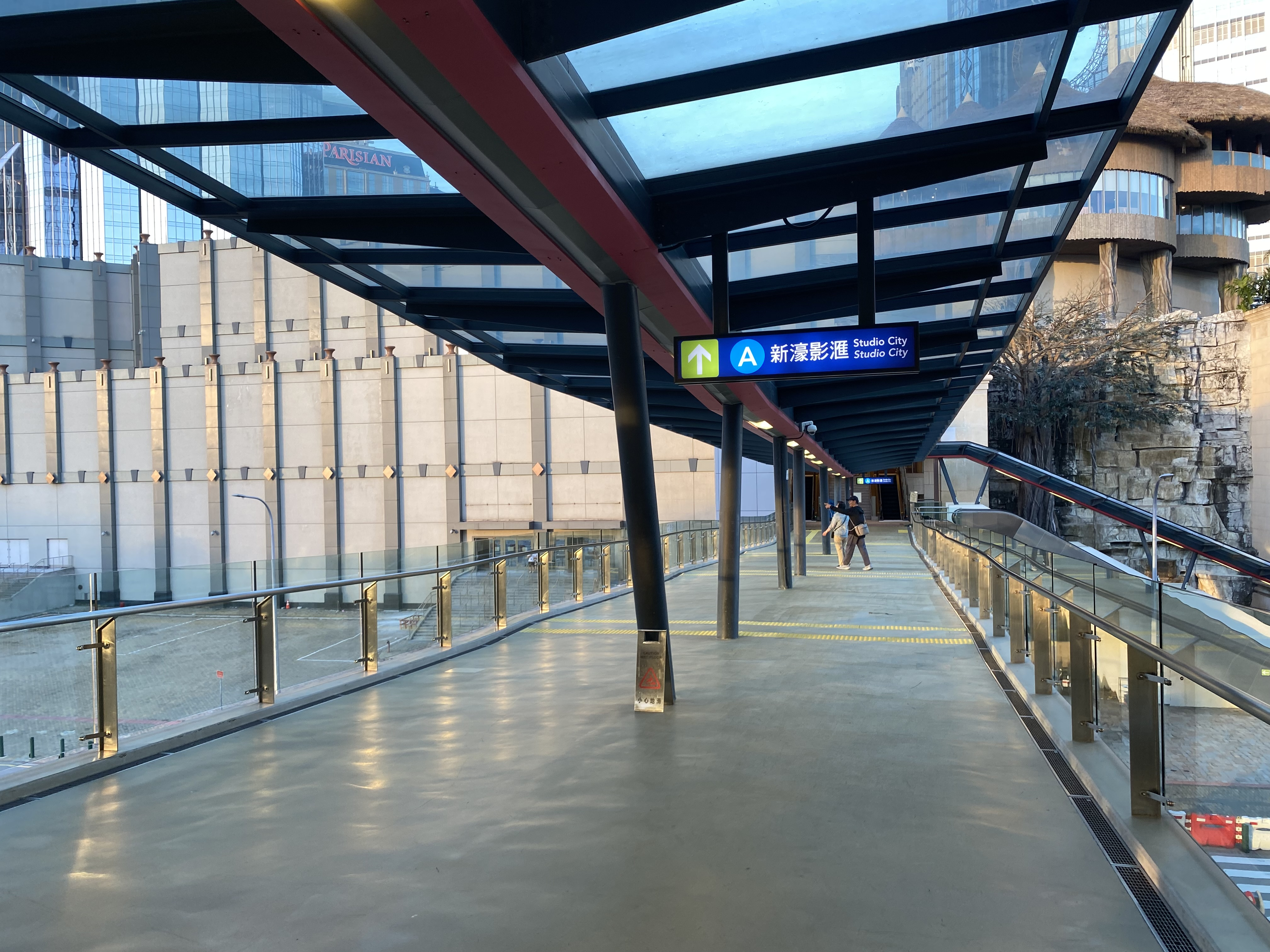
Footbridge connection at Lotus station

The station was built with two entrances/exits, one connecting to the Studio City hotel-casino and another to the Cotai Frontier Post. Upon the decommissioning of the Cotai Frontier Post, the original Exit B was closed and later demolished. Exit A connects to Studio City by way of a footbridge.

- A: Studio City
- ~~B: Lotus Checkpoint (exit closed as of August 2020)~~

== Services ==
Lotus is currently served by the Taipa line, which runs between Barra and Taipa Ferry Terminal, and the Hengqin line, which runs between this station and Hengqin station in the Macao-administered area of Hengqin, Zhuhai.
