= Zhuhai Changlong railway station =

Railway station in Zhuhai, China

Zhuhai Changlong 珠海长隆
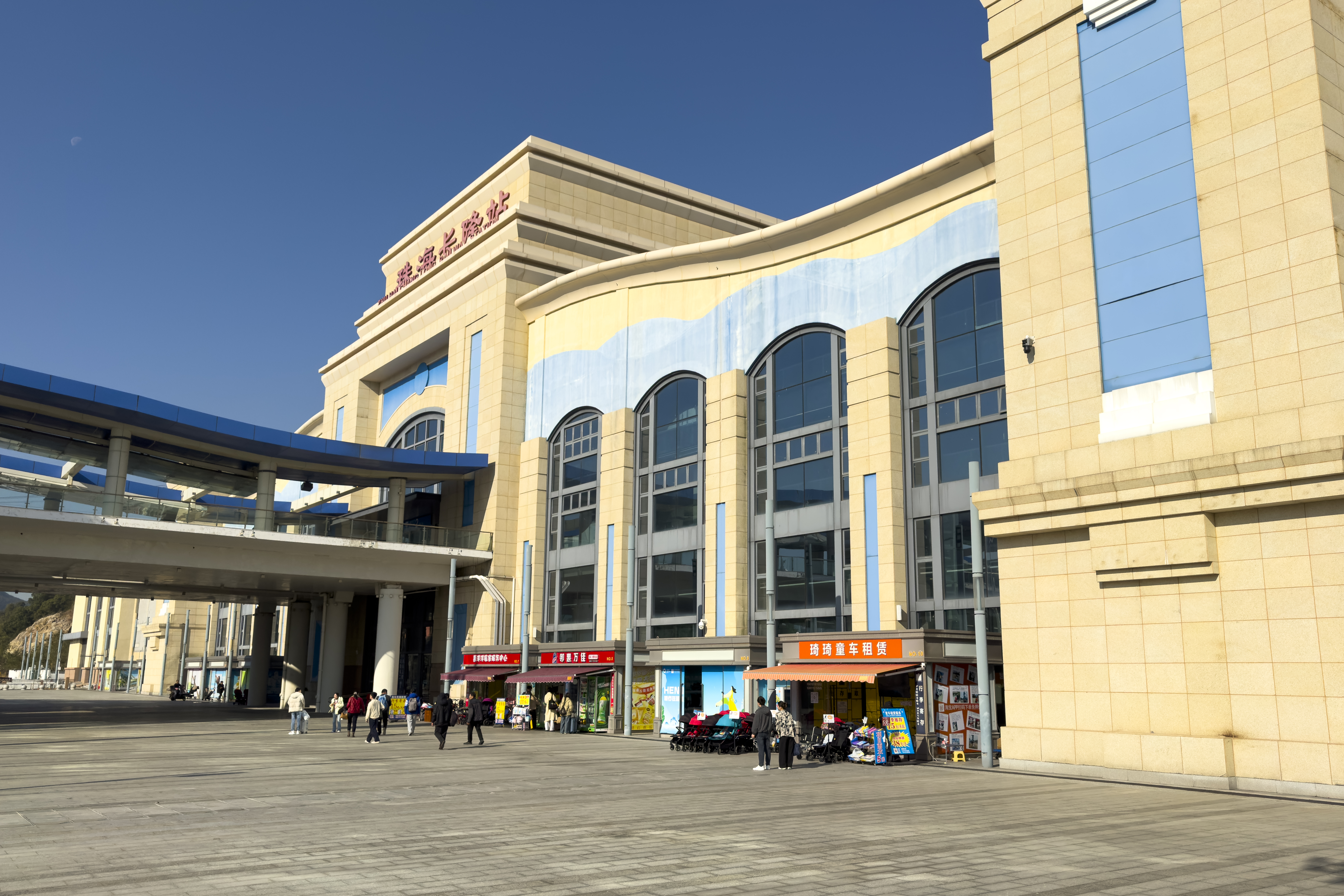

Chinese name
- Simplified Chinese: 珠海长隆站
- Traditional Chinese: 珠海長隆站
Transcriptions
Standard Mandarin
- Hanyu Pinyin: Zhūhǎi Chánglóng Zhàn
Yue: Cantonese
- Jyutping: zyu1 hoi2 coeng4 lung4 zaam6

General information
- Location: Changlong Boulevard, Xiangzhou District, Zhuhai, Guangdong, China
- Coordinates: 22.106998°N 113.536064°E
- Operated by: China Railway Guangzhou Group
- Line: Zhuhai–Zhuhai Airport intercity railway

History
- Opened: 18 August 2020

Services
Preceding station	Pearl River Delta Metropolitan Region Intercity Railway	Following station
Hengqin towards Zhuhai	Zhuhai–Zhuhai Airport intercity railway	Jingwan towards Zhuhai Airport
Location

Zhuhai Changlong railway station (Chinese: 珠海长隆站; pinyin: Zhūhǎi Chánglóng Zhàn) is a railway station of the Zhuhai–Zhuhai Airport intercity railway. It is the southern terminus of the first phase of the line, which started operations on 18 August 2020. It is 16.86 kilometres (10.48 mi) from Zhuhai railway station.

The railway station serves the Chimelong Ocean Kingdom of Chimelong International Ocean Tourist Resort. It is operated by China Railway Guangzhou Group.
