= Hengqin line =

Rapid transit line in Macau

Hengqin Line

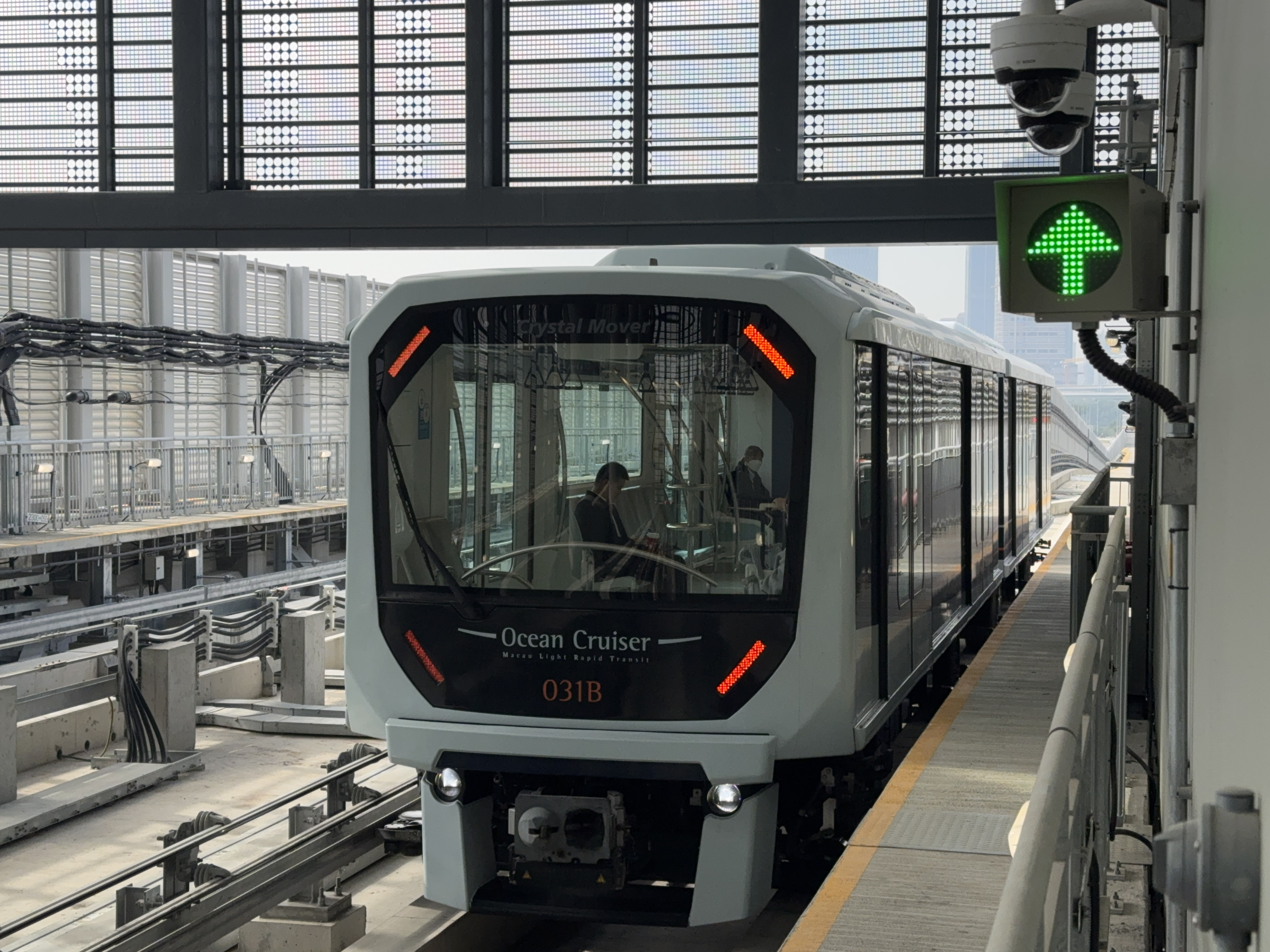

Overview
- Status: In operation
- Owner: Macau
- Locale: Macau and Hengqin, China
- Termini: Lotus; Hengqin
- Stations: 2

Service
- Type: Rapid transit
- System: Macau Light Rapid Transit
- Services: 1
- Operator: Macau Light Rapid Transit

History
- Opened: 2 December 2024

Technical
- Line length: 2.2 km (1.37 mi)
- Num of tracks: 1
- Character: Elevated & Underground

The Hengqin line (Chinese: 橫琴線; Jyutping: waang4 kam4 sin3, Portuguese: Linha de Hengqin) is a cross-border line of the Macau Light Rapid Transit that opened on 2 December 2024. The line operates as a shuttle between the existing Lotus station in Macau on the Taipa line and Hengqin station on the island of Hengqin in the city of Zhuhai, Guangdong, China.

The line is 2.2 km (1.4 mi) long, and 0.9 km (0.56 mi) is underground, including Hengqin station. Travel time on the line is about 2 minutes, with trains operating every 6 minutes.

== Stations ==
Station No.	Station name			Connections	Distance km	Freguesia/Zone
Station No.	English	Chinese	Portuguese	Connections	Distance km	Freguesia/Zone
HE1	Lotus	蓮花	Lótus	Taipa	0.0	Zona do Aterro de Cotai
HQ (formerly HE2 )	Hengqin	橫琴	Hengqin	Zhuji	2.2	Zona do Posto Fronteiriço de Macau do Posto Fronteiriço Hengqin
