= Zhuhai–Zhuhai Airport intercity railway =

Railway in China

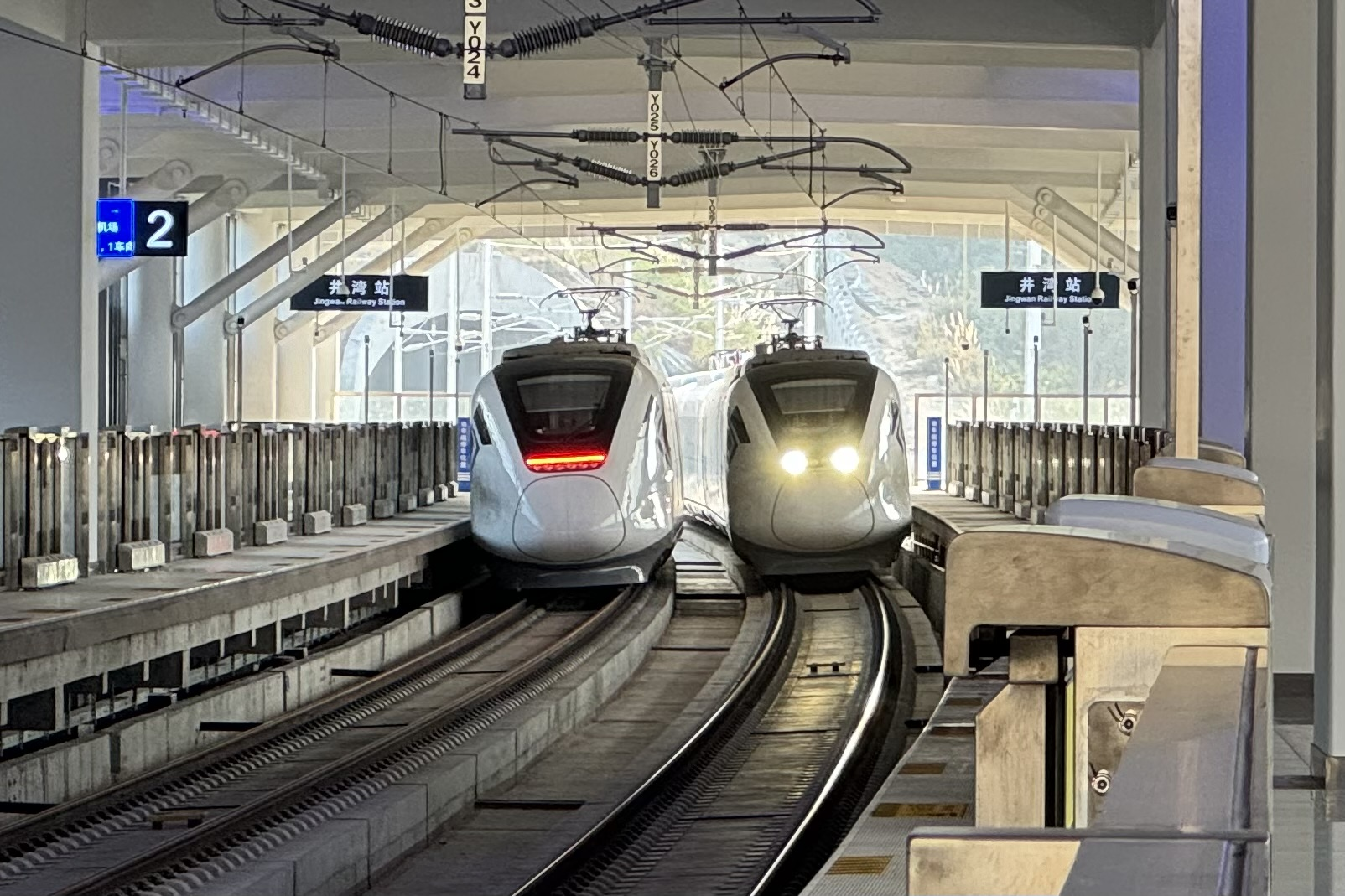
- CRH6A-A trains at Jingwan station

Overview
- Native name: 珠机城际铁路
- Status: Operational
- Locale: Zhuhai, Guangdong, China
- Termini: Zhuhai; Zhuhai Airport

Service
- Type: Regional rail
- System: Pearl River Delta Metropolitan Region intercity railway
- Operator: China Railway Guangzhou Group

History
- Opened: 18 August 2020; 5 years ago (Phase 1); 3 February 2024; 2 years ago (Phase 2)

Technical
- Line length: 39.475 km (full line)
- Track gauge: 1,435 mm (4 ft 8 1/2 in) standard gauge

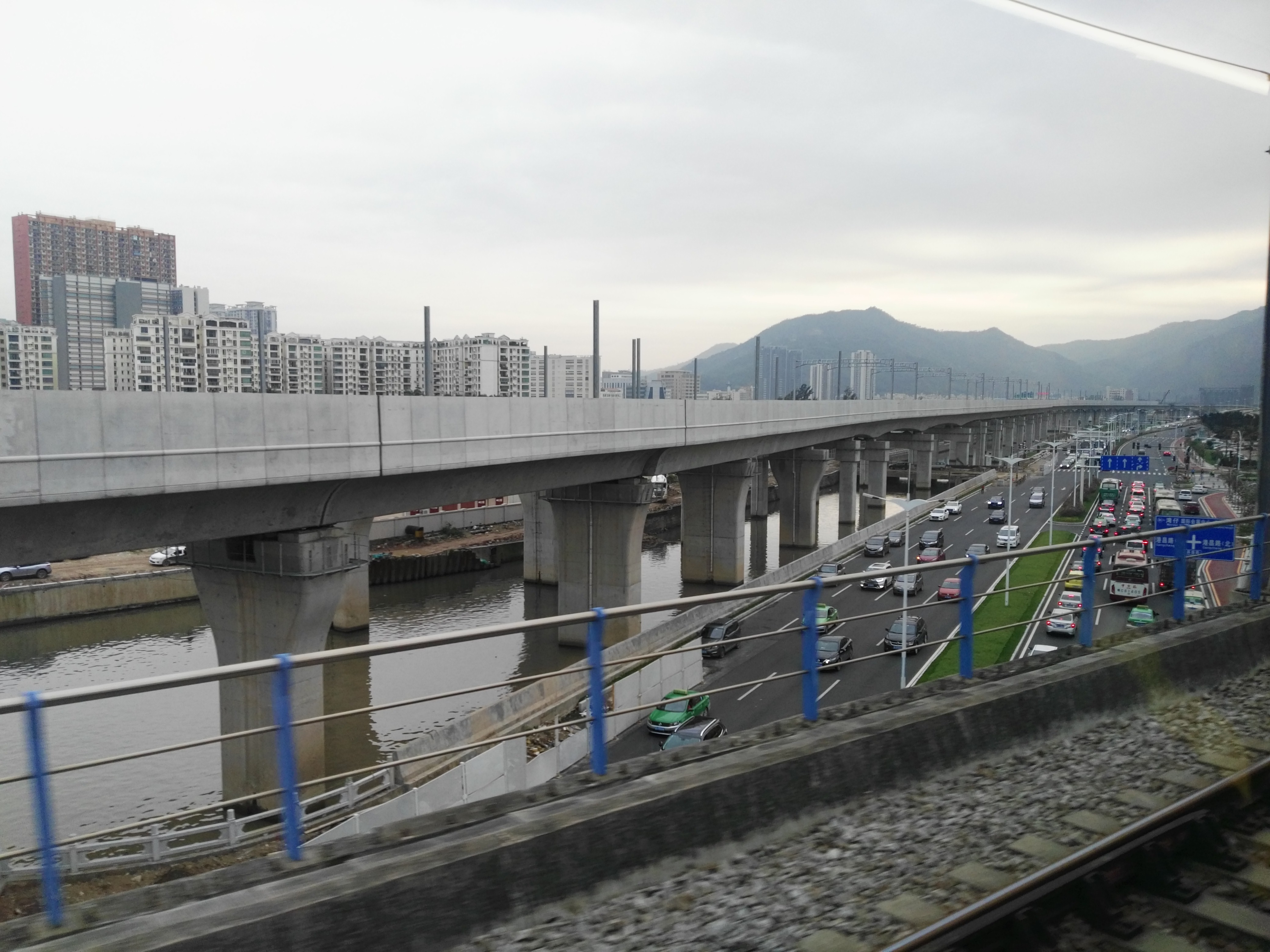
Zhuhai to Zhuhai Airport railway track under construction.

Zhuhai–Zhuhai Airport intercity railway, also known as the Zhuji intercity railway, is a regional railway in Zhuhai. The Phase 1 runs from Zhuhai railway station to Zhuhai Changlong railway station, while Phase 2 terminates at Zhuhai Jinwan Airport. It is operated by China Railway Guangzhou Group. The railway is an extension of the Guangzhou–Zhuhai intercity railway.

The construction of the railway will be split into two stages: Phase 1 from Zhuhai to Zhuhai Changlong. Phase 1 started operation on 18 August 2020 (except Wanzai). Phase 2 from Zhuhai Changlong to Zhuhai Airport started operation on 3 February 2024 (except Hezhou South).

== Stations ==
| Station Name | Chinese | Distance km | | Pearl River Delta intercity railway transfers/connections | Metro transfers/connections | Location |
|---|---|---|---|---|---|---|
| Zhuhai | 珠海 | 0.00 | 0.00 | GZ | | Xiangzhou |
| Wanzai North (Wanzaibei) | 湾仔北 | | | | | Xiangzhou |
| Wanzai ^{a} | 湾仔 | | | | Taipa (Barra station, via undersea tunnel) | Xiangzhou |
| Shizimen | 十字门 | | | | | Xiangzhou |
| Hengqin North (Hengqinbei) ^{b} | 横琴北 | | | | | Guangdong-Macao In-Depth Cooperation Zone in Hengqin |
| Hengqin | 横琴 | | | | Hengqin | Guangdong-Macao In-Depth Cooperation Zone in Hengqin |
| Zhuhai Changlong | 珠海长隆 | | 16.86 | | | Guangdong-Macao In-Depth Cooperation Zone in Hengqin |
| Jingwan ^{b} | 井湾 | | | | | Guangdong-Macao In-Depth Cooperation Zone in Hengqin |
| Hezhou South (Hezhounan) ^{c} | 鹤洲南 | | | | | Jinwan |
| Sanzao East (Sanzaodong) | 三灶东 | | | | | Jinwan |
| Zhuhai Airport | 珠海机场 | | | | | Jinwan |

^{a: Yet to be opened}

^{b: Suspended operation since 26 February 2024.}

^{c: Reserved}
