= Lotus Bridge =

Bridge in Macau

Lotus Bridge: 蓮花大橋; Ponte Flor de Lótus
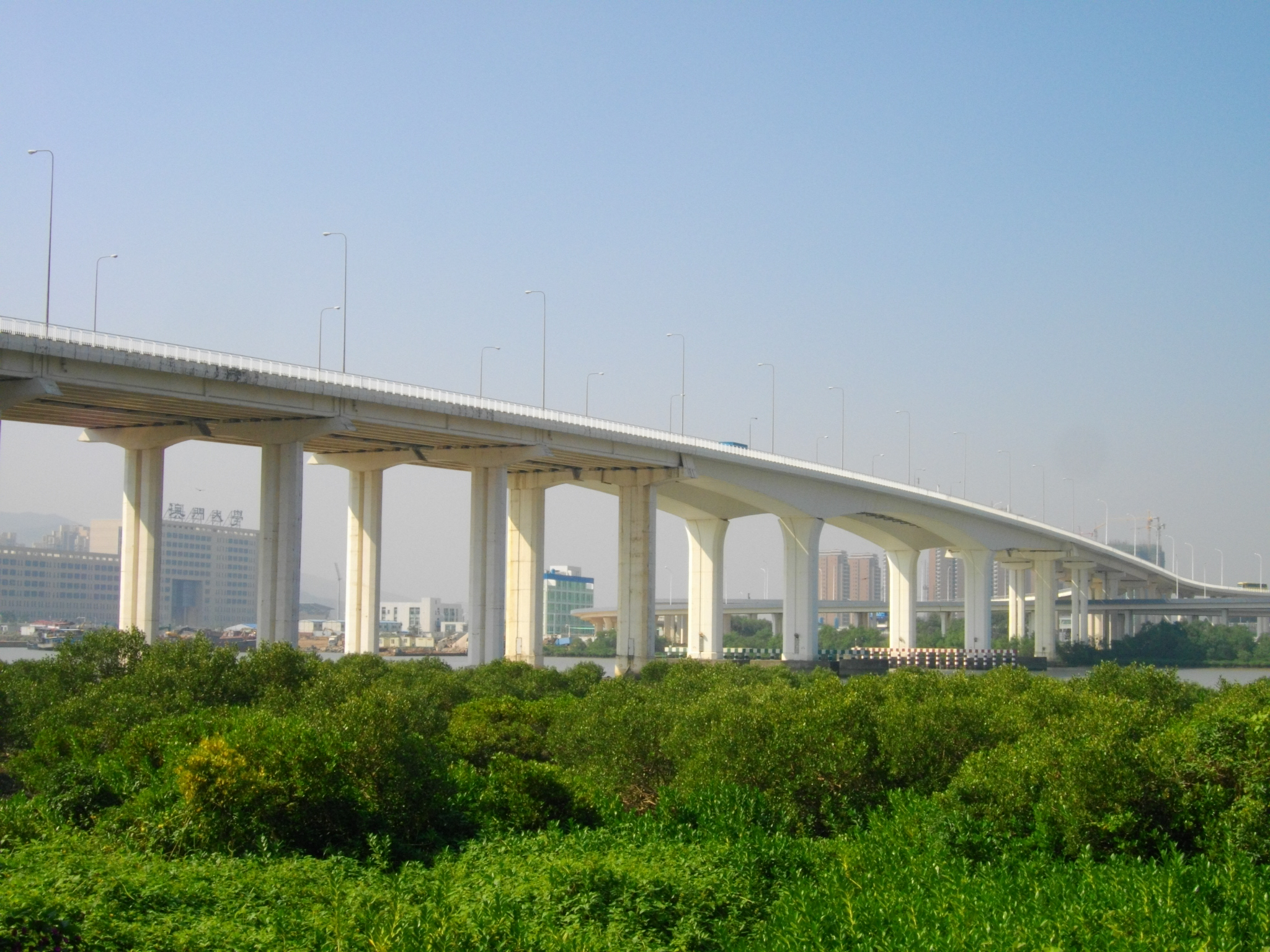
- Coordinates: 22.1402°N 113.5468°E
- Carries: 6 lanes
- Crosses: Shap Sam Mun Waterway (十三門水道)
- Locale: Cotai and Hengqin
- Other name: Lotus Flower Bridge
- Owner: Government of Macau

Characteristics
- Design: Girder bridge
- Total length: 1,756 metres (5,761 ft)
- Width: 30 metres (98 ft)

History
- Designer: Engineer Nuno Costa (Profabril)
- Contracted lead designer: China Railway Siyuan Survey and Design Group
- Opened: March 2000

Statistics
- Toll: Free

Location
- Interactive map of Lotus Bridge

Lotus Bridge
- Traditional Chinese: 蓮花大橋
- Simplified Chinese: 莲花大桥
Transcriptions
Standard Mandarin
- Hanyu Pinyin: Liánhuā Dàqiáo
Yue: Cantonese
- Jyutping: Lin^{4} Faa^{1} Daai^{6} Kiu^{4}

Lotus Bridge (Portuguese: Ponte Flor de Lótus; Chinese: 蓮花大橋) is a cross-border bridge linking the Cotai reclamation area of Macau with Hengqin Island in Zhuhai, Guangdong, mainland China. The bridge is a road crossing between mainland China and Macau. Since December 2014, it has been open 24 hours per day.

The bridge is located about 8 kilometres (5.0 mi) west of the Macau International Airport. The bridge has three lanes in each direction and follows Macau's rule of the road of driving on the left. The exit roads leaving the bridge on the mainland Chinese side have a special arrangement to facilitate switching westbound traffic from Macau driving on the left to driving on the right in mainland China.

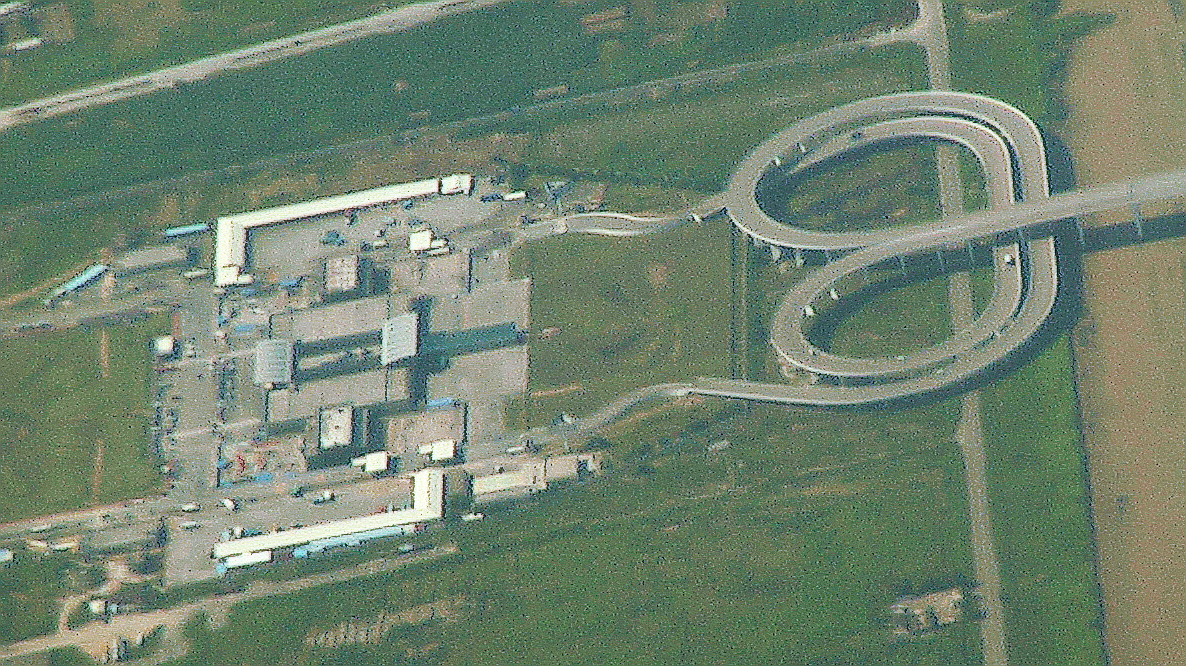
Aerial view of the western terminus of the Lotus Bridge, 2009.

== See also ==
- Transport in Macau
