= Hengqin =

Island in Zhuhai and Macau, China

Hengqin 横琴岛 Ilha da Montanha
- Town
- Guangdong-Macao In-Depth Cooperation Zone in Hengqin
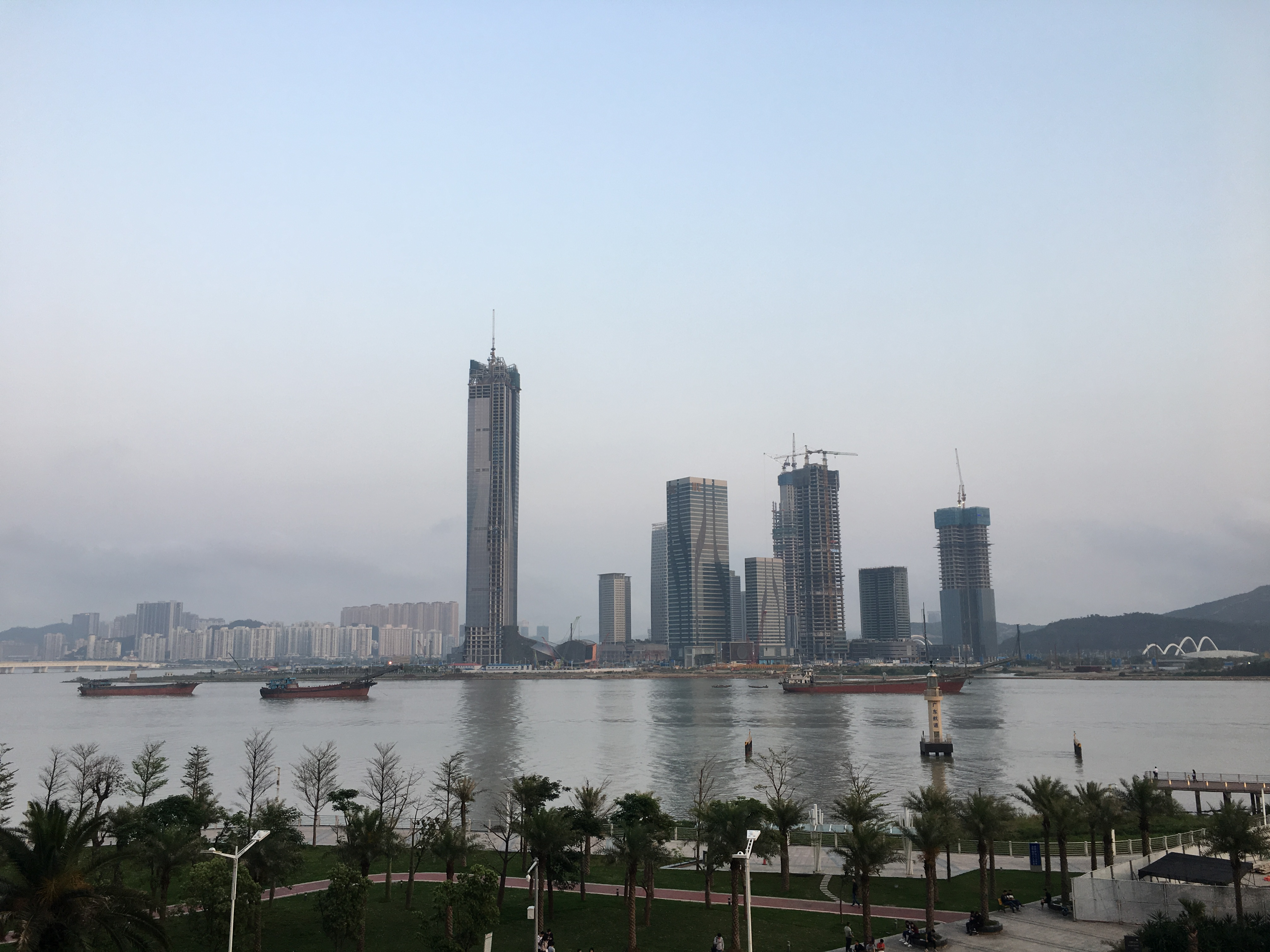
- View of the Shizimen CBD in Hengqin
- Interactive map of Hengqin
- Country: China
- City/SAR: Zhuhai / Macau (leased lands)

Area
  - Total: 106.46 km^{2} (41.10 sq mi)

Population
  - Total: 6,300
  - Density: 59/km^{2} (150/sq mi)
- Time zones: UTC+8 (China Standard Time)
- Macau Standard Time
- Website: hengqin.gov.cn

Hengqin

Chinese name
- Simplified Chinese: 横琴岛
- Traditional Chinese: 橫琴島
- Literal meaning: Horizontal Qin island
Transcriptions
Standard Mandarin
- Hanyu Pinyin: Héngqín dǎo
Yue: Cantonese
- Jyutping: waang4 kam4 dou2
- IPA: [wȁːŋ kʰɐ̏m]

Official name
- Simplified Chinese: 横琴粤澳深度合作区
- Traditional Chinese: 橫琴粵澳深度合作區
- Literal meaning: Guangdong-Macao In-Depth Cooperation Zone in Hengqin
Transcriptions
Standard Mandarin
- Hanyu Pinyin: Héngqín yuèào shēndù hézuò qū
Yue: Cantonese
- Jyutping: waang4 kam4 jyut6 ou3 sam1 dou6 hap6 zok3 keoi1

Portuguese name
- Portuguese: Ilha da Montanha (Zona de cooperação Aprofundada entre Guangdong e Macau em Hengqin)

Hengqin (simplified Chinese: 横琴岛; traditional Chinese: 橫琴島), also referred to as Ilha da Montanha, is an island that lies mostly in Zhuhai, a prefecture-level city and special economic zone in Guangdong Province of China. It has a population of about 3,000. Parts of Hengqin are leased to Macau by the State Council of the People's Republic of China, starting from 2009, mostly to house the new campus of the University of Macau. In the leased parts of the island, Macanese law applies.

The whole island is designated a special economic district, as the Guangdong-Macao In-Depth Cooperation Zone in Hengqin.

== Geography ==
Hengqin Island is adjacent to the Taipa and Coloane districts of Macau, with the Shisanmen Waterway separating them, and is connected to Macau's Cotai via the Lotus Bridge. The island is the largest among the 146 islands of Zhuhai, being roughly three times the size of Macau. Zhuhai Shizimen borders it to the north and Jinwan to the west. It has broad bays, sandy beaches, strangely shaped jagged rocks, scenery, and natural vegetation cover.

Hengqin was formerly made up of two islands, Small Hengqin (小橫琴; Portuguese: Dom João) and Great Hengqin (大橫琴; Portuguese: Montanha), which were recently connected as a result of land reclamation. The reclaimed island has an area of 96 km^{2} (37 sq mi).

== History ==
Portugal claimed both Small Hengqin and Great Hengqin, along with the larger former island of Wanzai (Portuguese: Lapa) — now a peninsula — to their north, as part of the Província de Macau, because "Portuguese schools are established there". In 1896, Portuguese determined to occupy the two islands of Hengqin, but did not succeed in doing so. Portugal briefly occupied them before World War II.

Since the land reclamation and development, there has been a growing opinion in Macau that the island should be leased to Macau, which has very limited land and little room for further development. By 1 September 2005, plans were revealed that the government of Guangdong will allow tax exemptions and adopt flexible immigration control in Hengqin to promote investment from Hong Kong and Macau.

On 27 June 2009, the government of Macau officially announced that the University of Macau would build its new campus on 1 km^{2} of the island, in a stretch directly facing the Cotai area, south of the current border post. This would be the first of other possible projects. Construction of the campus would take three years and would include an underwater tunnel. The Standing Committee of the National People's Congress officially adopted a decision authorising Macau to exercise jurisdiction over the new campus on its opening. Macau law would apply in the university campus and it would not be necessary to pass a formal border post. The Macau Special Administrative Region will pay an amount of rent – which has not yet been set – for the use of the land.

In early 2013, the Macau Legislative Assembly passed Law 3/2013 providing for the application of Macau Law in the campus effective on opening day. In 2020, the Macau Legislative Assembly passed Law 1/2020 providing for the application of Macau Law in a part of Hengqin Port. Macau's jurisdiction over this area became effective on 18 March.

== Tourism ==
With Hengqin island, the goal of the authorities is to create a combined Las Vegas and Orlando for Asia, with an expansive casino offering in Macau, and at the same time non-gaming leisure and tourist activities.

In late 2005, Las Vegas Sands openly discussed its multibillion-dollar plan to develop parts of Hengqin Island into a convention and resort destination. The project was to include four million sq ft of convention space, hotels, retail, vacation homes, and golf, tennis and yachting amenities.

On 29 November 2010, the main body of the Chime-Long International Ocean Resort (with an initial investment of 10 billion yuan) kicked off construction on Hengqin Island and was originally expected to become operational in 2013.

The Chimelong Ocean Kingdom, consisting of entertainment facilities, amusement rides, performances, high-tech experiences and animal watching as well as the dolphin-themed hotel with 1,888 guest rooms was opened in 2014, and has been the 11th most visited theme park in the world in 2017.

The Hengqin International Tennis Center opened in September 2015. Until 2023 it hosted three international competitions: the WTA Elite Trophy, the Zhuhai Open and the Asia-Pacific Wildcard Playoff for the Australian Open.

SJM Resorts is planning to develop a luxury boutique hotel in Hengqin. It will not contain a casino.

== Gallery ==
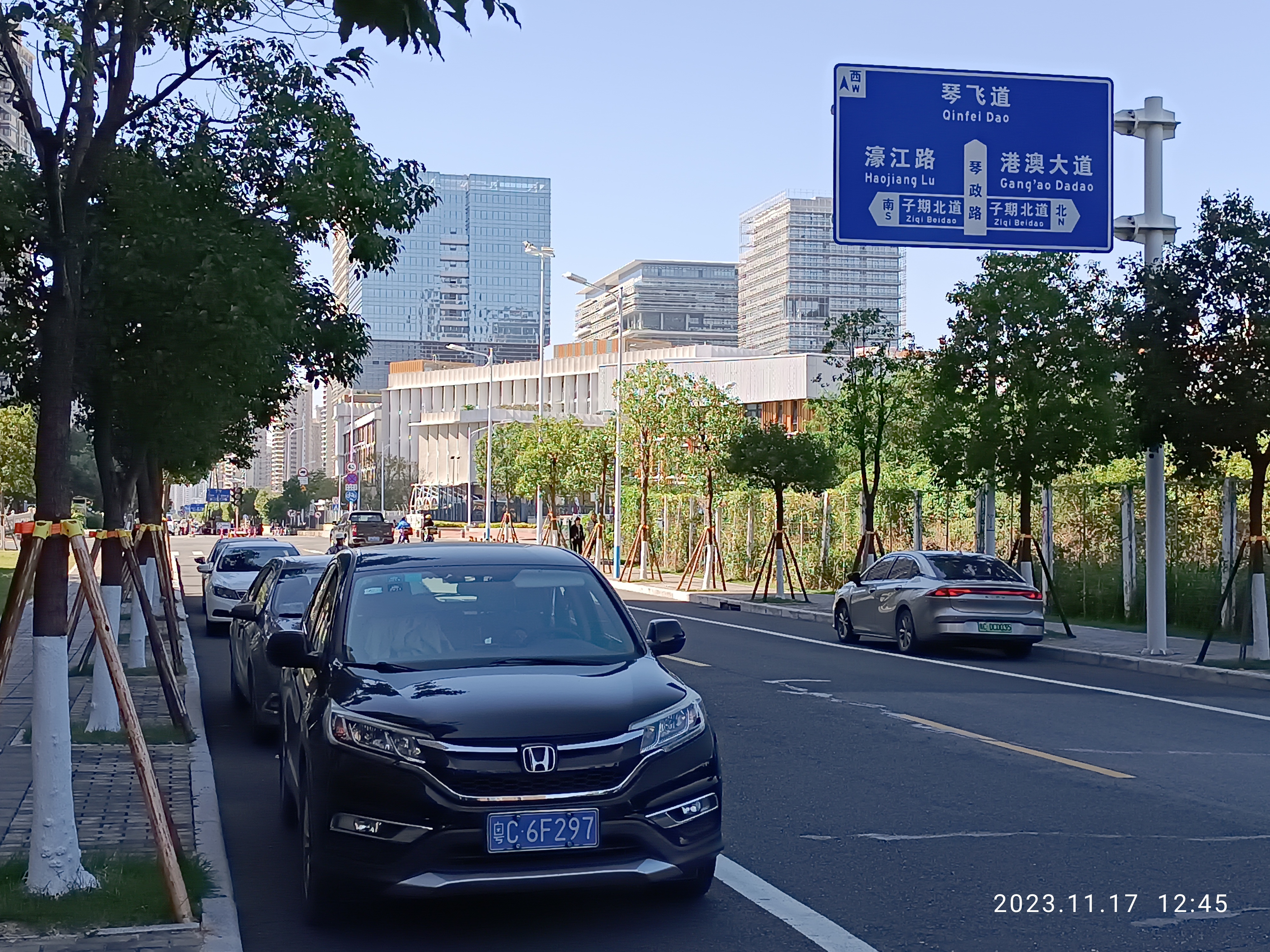

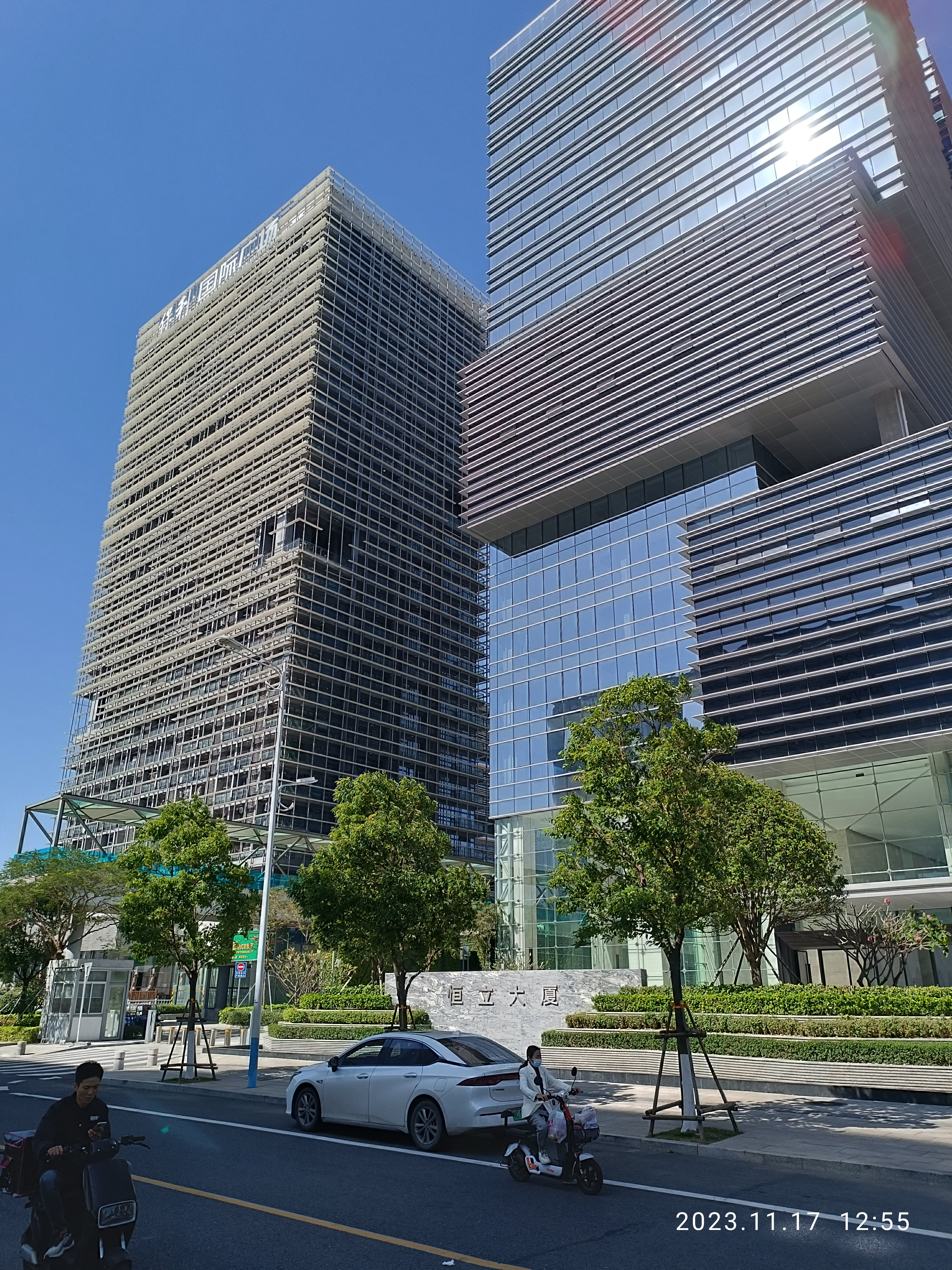

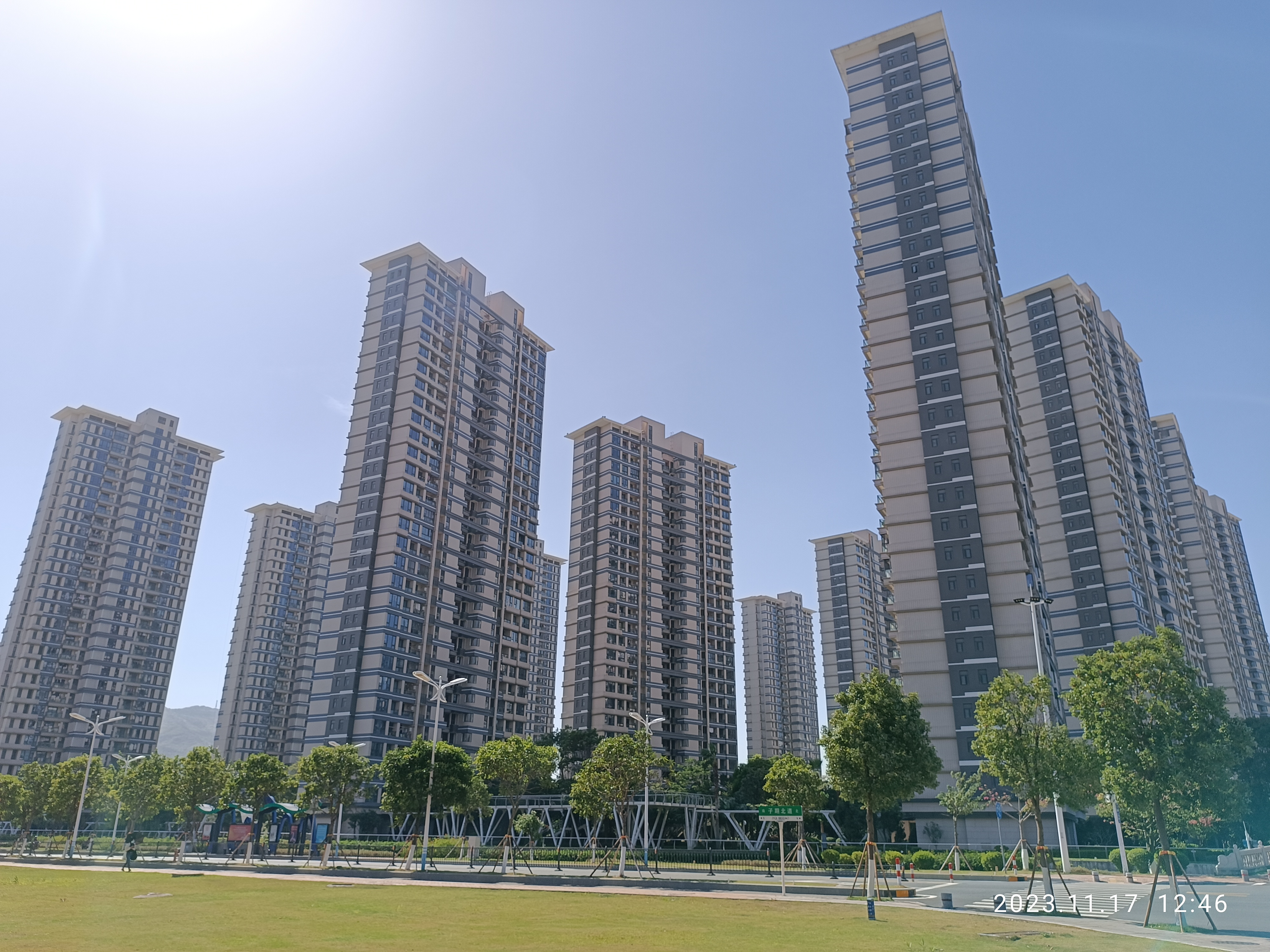

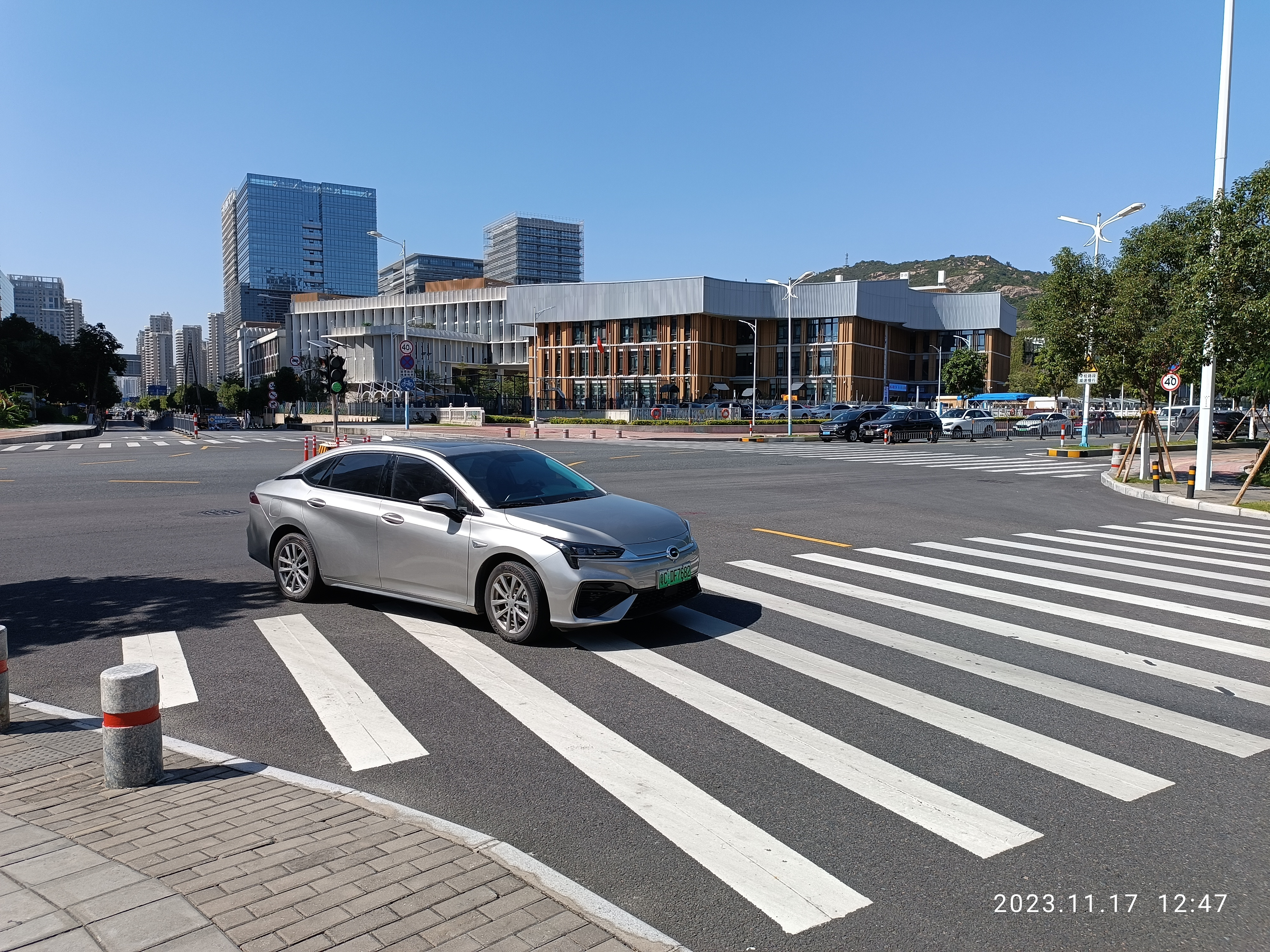

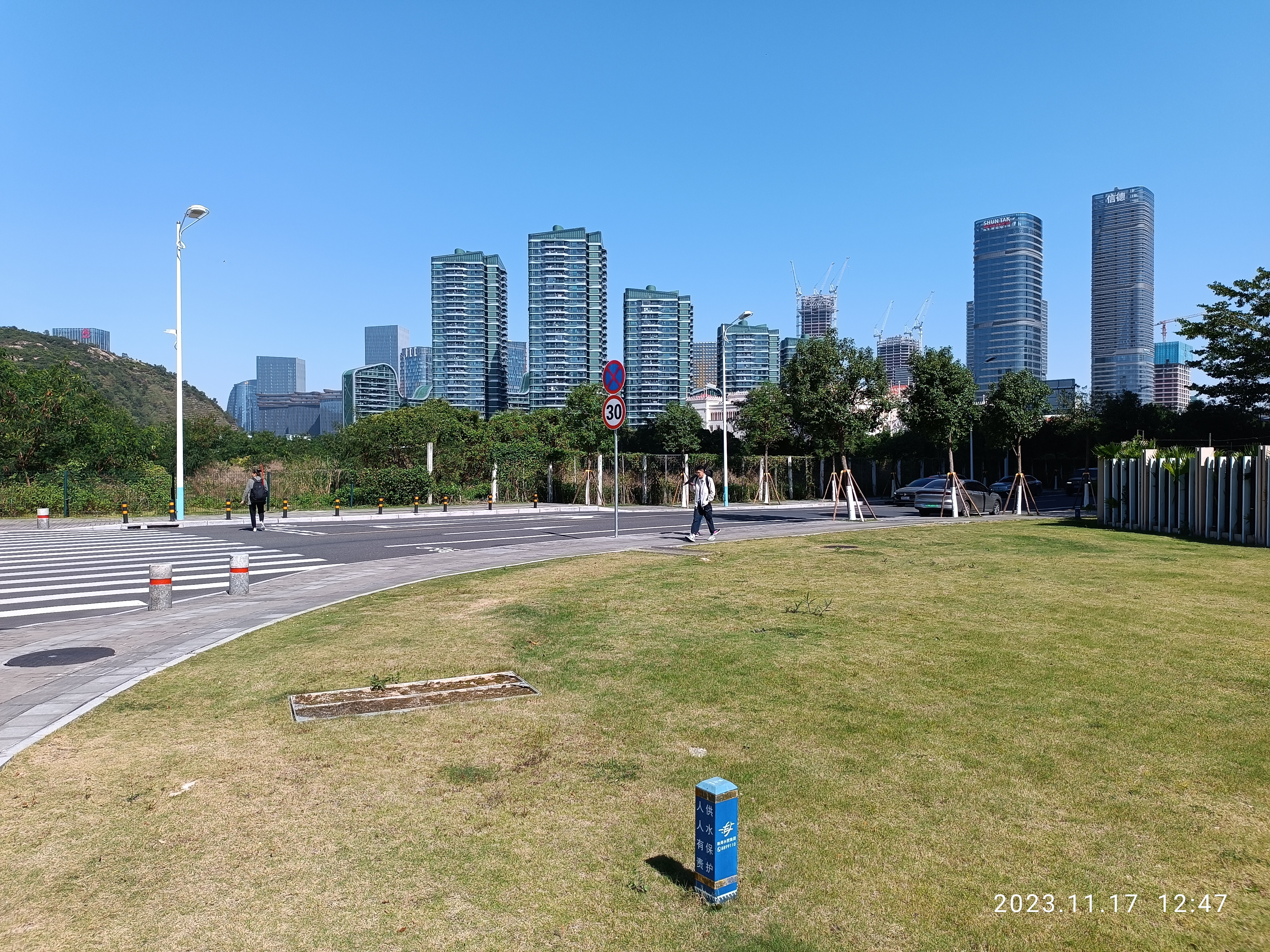

== Subdistricts ==
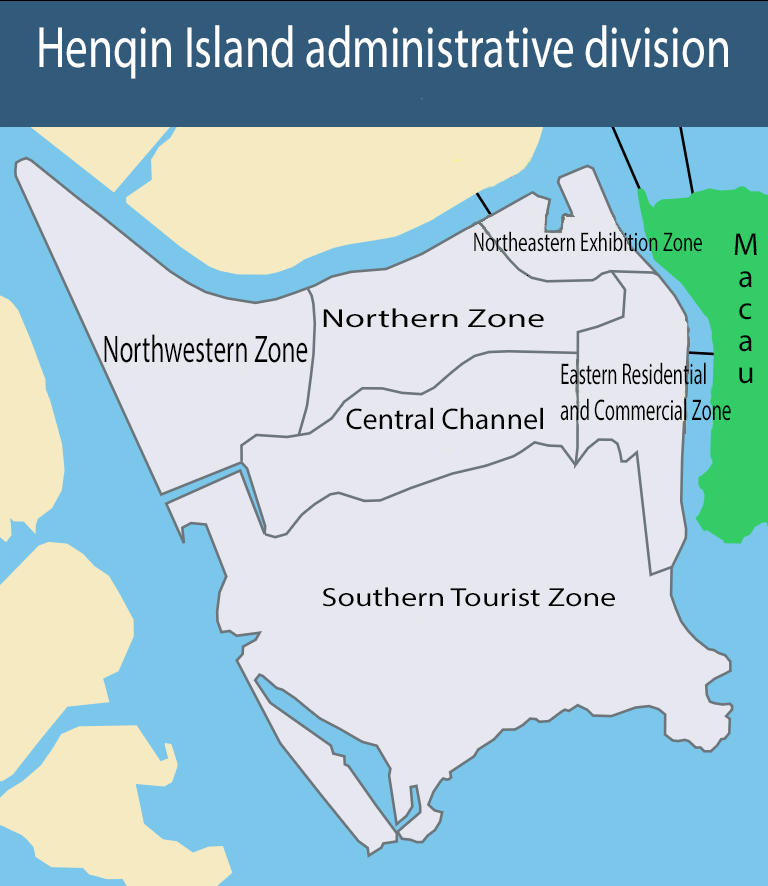
A map of Hengqin with its six subdistricts

- Northwestern Zone – reserved for environmentally friendly development projects
- Northern Zone – A Bridge and main entrance between Central Zhuhai and Hengqin
- Northeastern Exhibition Zone – development of an exhibition center and hotels
- Central Channel – develop as a leisure and recreational theme park
- Eastern Residential and Commercial Zone – co-development of Mainland and Macau projects such as University of Macau's new campus
- Eastern Residential and Commercial Zone – Macau Cotai-Lotus bridge-Hengqin port
- Eastern Residential and Commercial Zone – Hengqin railway station
- Eastern Residential and Commercial Zone – Hengqin hospital
- Southern Tourist Zone – A future tourism attraction which is further divided into seven sub-zones
  - Theme Park Area
  - Seaside Hotel Area
  - Natural Tourist Area
  - Scenic Area
  - Water Activities Area
  - Seaside Holiday Resort Area
  - Golf Course Holiday Resort Area
- Hengqin Bridge
