= List of amusement park rankings =

Amusement parks and theme parks are terms for a group of entertainment attractions, rides, and other events in a location for the enjoyment of large numbers of people. Amusement parks are located all around the world with millions of people visiting them every year. This list of amusement park rankings summarizes the attendance records, park rankings and the results of public polls of amusement parks around the world.

== Attendance records ==
This is a list of annual attendance figures of amusement parks and water parks released by TEA, the Themed Entertainment Association.

=== Amusement park corporations ===
This section lists the top 10 largest amusement park corporations in order of annual attendance.

Annual attendance (thousands)
Rank	Amusement park corporations	Country	2009	2010	2011	2012	2013	2014	2015	2016	2017	2018	2019	2022	2023	2024
1	Disney Experiences	United States	119,100	120,600	121,400	126,479	132,549	134,330	137,902	140,403	150,014	157,311	155,991	121,027	143,428	145,196
2	Fantawild Group	China	—N/a	—N/a	—N/a	9,193	13,188	—N/a	23,093	31,639	38,495	42,074	50,393	40,530	85,689	87,168
3	Merlin Entertainments	United Kingdom	38,500	41,000	46,400	54,000	59,800	62,800	62,900	61,200	66,000	67,000	67,000	55,100	62,100	62,800
4	Universal Destinations & Experiences	United States	23,700	26,300	30,800	34,515	36,360	40,152	44,884	47,356	49,458	50,068	51,243	51,380	59,410	58,975
5	Six Flags Entertainment Corporation (Note: Six Flags Entertainment Corporation refers to the company formed in 2024 as a result of the merger between Cedar Fair and the former Six Flags company.)	United States	—N/a	—N/a	—N/a	—N/a	—N/a	—N/a	—N/a	—N/a	—N/a	—N/a	—N/a	—N/a	48,945	50,300
6	Overseas Chinese Town (OCT) Group	China	15,800	19,300	21,730	23,359	26,180	27,990	28,830	32,270	42,880	49,350	53,970	—N/a	35,710	41,100
7	Chimelong Group	China	—N/a	—N/a	—N/a	—N/a	11,672	18,659	23,587	27,362	31,031	34,007	37,018	14,540	36,090	39,370
8	United Parks & Resorts	United States	23,500	22,400	23,600	24,310	23,400	22,399	22,471	22,000	20,800	22,582	22,624	21,940	21,606	22,947
9	Haichang Ocean Park Holdings	China	—N/a	—N/a	—N/a	—N/a	—N/a	—N/a	—N/a	—N/a	—N/a	—N/a	—N/a	—N/a	20,134	22,594
10	Parques Reunidos	Spain	24,800	25,800	26,220	27,130	26,017	22,206	—N/a	20,825	20,600	20,900	22,195	18,500	19,340	19,400

=== Amusement parks ===
==== Worldwide ====
This section lists the top 25 largest amusement parks worldwide in order of annual attendance in 2024.

Rank	Amusement park	Location	2009	2010	2011	2012	2013	2014	2015	2016	2017	2018	2019	2020	2021	2022	2023	2024
1	Magic Kingdom at Walt Disney World Resort	Bay Lake, Florida, United States	17,233,000	16,972,000	17,142,000	17,536,000	18,588,000	19,332,000	20,492,888	20,395,000	20,450,000	20,859,000	20,963,000	6,941,000	12,691,000	17,133,000	17,720,000	17,836,000
2	Disneyland at Disneyland Resort	Anaheim, California, United States	15,900,000	15,980,000	16,140,000	15,963,000	16,202,000	16,769,000	18,278,000	17,943,000	18,300,000	18,666,000	18,666,000	3,674,000	8,573,000	16,881,000	17,250,000	17,337,000
3	Universal Studios Japan	Osaka, Japan	8,000,000	8,160,000	8,500,000	9,700,000	10,100,000	11,800,000	13,900,000	14,500,000	14,935,000	14,300,000	14,500,000	4,901,000	5,500,000	12,350,000	16,000,000	16,000,000
4	Tokyo Disneyland at Tokyo Disney Resort	Tokyo, Japan	13,646,000	14,452,000	13,996,000	14,847,000	17,214,000	17,300,000	16,600,000	16,540,000	16,600,000	17,907,000	17,910,000	4,160,000	6,300,000	12,000,000	14,724,000	15,104,000
5	Shanghai Disneyland	Shanghai, China	—N/a	—N/a	—N/a	—N/a	—N/a	—N/a	—N/a	5,600,000	11,000,000	11,800,000	11,210,000	5,500,000	8,480,000	5,300,000	14,000,000	14,700,000
6	Chimelong Ocean Kingdom	Hengqin, China	—N/a	—N/a	—N/a	—N/a	—N/a	5,504,000	7,486,000	8,474,000	9,788,000	10,830,000	11,736,000	4,797,000	7,452,000	4,400,000	12,520,000	12,628,000
7	Tokyo DisneySea at Tokyo Disney Resort	Tokyo, Japan	12,004,000	12,663,000	11,930,000	12,656,000	14,084,000	14,100,000	13,600,000	13,460,000	13,500,000	14,651,000	14,650,000	3,400,000	5,800,000	10,100,000	12,091,000	12,441,000
8	Epcot at Walt Disney World Resort	Bay Lake, Florida, United States	10,990,000	10,825,000	10,825,000	11,063,000	11,229,000	11,454,000	11,798,000	11,712,000	12,200,000	12,444,000	12,444,000	4,044,000	7,752,000	10,000,000	11,980,000	12,133,000
9	Disney's Hollywood Studios at Walt Disney World Resort	Bay Lake, Florida, United States	9,700,000	9,603,000	9,699,000	9,912,000	10,110,000	10,312,000	10,828,000	10,776,000	10,722,000	11,258,000	11,483,000	3,675,000	8,589,000	10,900,000	10,300,000	10,333,000
10	Disneyland Park at Disneyland Paris	Marne-la-Vallée, France	12,740,000	10,500,000	10,990,000	11,200,000	10,430,000	9,940,000	10,360,000	8,400,000	9,660,000	9,843,000	9,745,000	2,620,000	3,500,000	9,930,000	10,400,000	10,214,000
11	Disney California Adventure at Disneyland Resort	Anaheim, California, United States	6,095,000	6,287,000	6,341,000	7,775,000	8,514,000	8,769,000	9,383,000	9,295,000	9,574,000	9,861,000	9,861,000	1,919,000	4,977,000	9,000,000	10,000,000	10,050,000
12	Universal Studios Beijing	Beijing, China	—N/a	—N/a	—N/a	—N/a	—N/a	—N/a	—N/a	—N/a	—N/a	—N/a	—N/a	—N/a	—N/a	4,300,000	9,000,000	9,775,000
13	Universal Studios Florida at Universal Orlando Resort	Orlando, Florida, United States	5,530,000	5,925,000	6,044,000	6,195,000	7,062,000	8,263,000	9,585,000	9,998,000	10,198,000	10,708,000	10,922,000	4,096,000	8,987,000	10,750,000	9,750,000	9,500,000
14	Universal Islands of Adventure at Universal Orlando Resort	Orlando, Florida, United States	4,627,000	5,949,000	7,674,000	7,981,000	8,141,000	8,141,000	8,792,000	9,362,000	9,549,000	9,788,000	10,375,000	4,005,000	9,077,000	11,025,000	10,000,000	9,450,000
15	Disney's Animal Kingdom at Walt Disney World Resort	Bay Lake, Florida, United States	9,590,000	9,686,000	9,783,000	9,998,000	10,198,000	10,402,000	10,922,000	10,844,000	12,500,000	13,750,000	13,888,000	4,166,000	7,194,000	9,027,000	8,770,000	8,800,000
16	Universal Studios Hollywood	Universal City, California, United States	4,308,000	5,040,000	5,141,000	5,912,000	6,148,000	6,824,000	7,097,000	8,086,000	9,056,000	9,147,000	9,147,000	1,299,000	5,505,000	8,400,000	9,660,000	8,700,000
17	Hong Kong Disneyland	Hong Kong SAR	4,600,000	5,200,000	5,900,000	6,700,000	7,400,000	7,500,000	6,800,000	6,100,000	6,200,000	6,700,000	5,695,000	1,700,000	2,800,000	3,400,000	7,685,000	7,936,000
18	Europa-Park	Rust, Germany	4,250,000	4,250,000	4,500,000	4,600,000	4,900,000	5,000,000	5,500,000	5,600,000	5,700,000	5,720,000	5,750,000	2,500,000	3,000,000	5,400,000	6,000,000	6,200,000
19	De Efteling	Kaatsheuvel, Netherlands	4,000,000	4,000,000	4,125,000	4,200,000	4,150,000	4,400,000	4,680,000	4,764,000	5,180,000	5,400,000	5,400,000	2,900,000	3,300,000	5,430,000	5,560,000	5,600,000
T20	Disney Adventure World at Disneyland Paris	Marne-la-Vallée, France	2,655,000	4,500,000	4,710,000	4,800,000	4,470,000	4,260,000	4,440,000	4,970,000	5,200,000	5,298,000	5,245,000	1,410,000	1,894,000	5,340,000	5,700,000	5,598,000
T20	Everland	Yongin, South Korea	6,169,000	6,884,000	6,570,000	6,853,000	7,303,000	7,381,000	7,423,000	7,200,000	6,310,000	5,850,000	6,606,000	2,760,000	3,710,000	5,770,000	5,880,000	5,598,000
22	China Dinosaurs Park	Changzhou, China	—N/a	—N/a	—N/a	—N/a	—N/a	—N/a	—N/a	—N/a	—N/a	—N/a	—N/a	—N/a	—N/a	—N/a	4,300,000	5,380,000
23	Lotte World	Seoul, South Korea	4,261,000	5,551,000	5,780,000	6,383,000	7,400,000	7,606,000	7,310,000	8,150,000	6,714,000	5,960,000	5,953,000	1,560,000	2,460,000	4,520,000	5,190,000	5,300,000
24	Shanghai Haichang Ocean Park	Shanghai, China	—N/a	—N/a	—N/a	—N/a	—N/a	—N/a	—N/a	—N/a	—N/a	—N/a	—N/a	—N/a	—N/a	—N/a	4,290,000	4,730,000
25	Chimelong Spaceship	Hengqin, China	—N/a	—N/a	—N/a	—N/a	—N/a	—N/a	—N/a	—N/a	—N/a	—N/a	—N/a	—N/a	—N/a	—N/a	1,356,000	4,627,000

==== North America ====
This section lists the top 20 largest amusement parks in North America in order of annual attendance in 2024.

Rank	Amusement park	Location	2009	2010	2011	2012	2013	2014	2015	2016	2017	2018	2019	2020	2021	2022	2023	2024
1	Magic Kingdom at Walt Disney World Resort	Bay Lake, Florida, United States	17,233,000	16,972,000	17,142,000	17,536,000	18,588,000	19,332,000	20,492,000	20,395,000	20,450,000	20,859,000	20,963,000	6,941,000	12,691,000	17,133,000	17,720,000	17,836,000
2	Disneyland at Disneyland Resort	Anaheim, California, United States	15,900,000	15,980,000	16,140,000	15,963,000	16,202,000	16,769,000	18,278,000	17,943,000	18,300,000	18,666,000	18,666,000	3,674,000	8,573,000	16,881,000	17,250,000	17,337,000
3	Epcot at Walt Disney World Resort	Bay Lake, Florida, United States	10,990,000	10,825,000	10,825,000	11,063,000	11,229,000	11,454,000	11,798,000	11,712,000	12,200,000	12,444,000	12,444,000	4,044,000	7,752,000	10,000,000	11,980,000	12,133,000
4	Disney's Hollywood Studios at Walt Disney World Resort	Bay Lake, Florida, United States	9,700,000	9,603,000	9,699,000	9,912,000	10,110,000	10,312,000	10,828,000	10,776,000	10,722,000	11,258,000	11,483,000	3,675,000	8,589,000	10,900,000	10,300,000	10,333,000
5	Disney California Adventure at Disneyland Resort	Anaheim, California, United States	6,095,000	6,278,000	6,341,000	7,775,000	8,514,000	8,769,000	9,383,000	9,295,000	9,574,000	9,861,000	9,861,000	1,919,000	4,977,000	9,000,000	10,000,000	10,050,000
6	Universal Studios Florida at Universal Orlando Resort	Orlando, Florida, United States	5,530,000	5,925,000	6,044,000	6,195,000	7,062,000	8,263,000	9,585,000	9,998,000	10,198,000	10,708,000	10,922,000	4,096,000	8,987,000	10,750,000	9,750,000	9,500,000
7	Universal Islands of Adventure at Universal Orlando Resort	Orlando, Florida, United States	4,627,000	5,949,000	7,674,000	7,981,000	8,141,000	8,141,000	8,792,000	9,362,000	9,549,000	9,788,000	10,375,000	4,005,000	9,077,000	11,025,000	10,000,000	9,450,000
8	Disney's Animal Kingdom at Walt Disney World Resort	Bay Lake, Florida, United States	9,590,000	9,686,000	9,783,000	9,998,000	10,198,000	10,402,000	10,922,000	10,844,000	12,500,000	13,750,000	13,888,000	4,166,000	7,194,000	9,027,000	8,770,000	8,800,000
9	Universal Studios Hollywood	Universal City, California, United States	4,308,000	5,040,000	5,141,000	5,912,000	6,148,000	6,824,000	7,097,000	8,086,000	9,056,000	9,147,000	9,147,000	1,299,000	5,505,000	8,400,000	9,660,000	8,700,000
10	Knott's Berry Farm	Buena Park, California, United States	3,333,000	3,600,000	3,654,000	3,508,000	3,683,000	3,683,000	3,867,000	4,014,000	4,034,000	4,115,000	4,238,000	811,000	3,681,000	3,899,000	4,228,000	4,503,000
11	SeaWorld Orlando	Orlando, Florida, United States	5,800,000	5,100,000	5,202,000	5,358,000	5,090,000	4,683,000	4,777,000	4,402,000	3,962,000	4,594,000	4,640,000	1,598,000	3,051,000	4,454,000	4,342,000	4,347,000
12	SeaWorld San Diego	San Diego, California, United States	4,200,000	3,800,000	4,294,000	4,444,000	4,311,000	3,794,000	3,528,000	3,528,000	3,100,000	3,723,000	3,731,000	1,139,000	2,800,000	3,507,000	3,990,000	4,022,000
13	Busch Gardens Tampa Bay	Tampa, Florida, United States	4,100,000	4,200,000	4,284,000	4,348,000	4,087,000	4,128,000	4,252,000	4,169,000	3,961,000	4,139,000	4,180,000	1,288,000	3,210,000	4,051,000	4,000,000	3,975,000
14	Cedar Point	Sandusky, Ohio, United States	2,942,000	3,051,000	3,143,000	3,221,000	3,382,000	3,247,000	3,507,000	3,604,000	3,604,000	3,676,000	3,610,000	1,020,000	3,327,000	3,444,000	3,600,000	3,780,000
15	Kings Island	Mason, Ohio, United States	3,000,000	3,112,000	3,143,000	3,206,000	3,206,000	3,238,000	3,335,000	3,384,000	3,469,000	3,486,000	3,485,000	1,626,000	3,181,000	3,340,000	3,300,000	3,465,000
16	Six Flags Magic Mountain	Valencia, California, United States	2,500,000	2,600,000	2,700,000	2,808,000	2,906,000	2,848,000	3,104,000	3,332,000	3,365,000	3,592,000	3,610,000	686,000	3,047,000	2,993,000	3,300,000	3,317,000
17	Canada's Wonderland	Vaughan, Ontario, Canada	3,160,000	3,380,000	3,481,000	3,655,000	3,582,000	3,546,000	3,617,000	3,723,000	3,760,000	3,798,000	3,950,000	—N/a	587,000	3,768,000	3,232,000	3,264,000
18	Dollywood	Pigeon Forge, Tennessee, United States	—N/a	—N/a	—N/a	—N/a	—N/a	—N/a	—N/a	—N/a	—N/a	—N/a	—N/a	—N/a	—N/a	—N/a	3,121,000	3,144,000
19	Six Flags Great America	Gurnee, Illinois, United States	—N/a	—N/a	—N/a	—N/a	—N/a	—N/a	2,780,000	2,950,000	3,039,000	3,107,000	3,169,000	—N/a	2,675,000	2,535,000	2,900,000	3,045,000
20	Hersheypark	Hershey, Pennsylvania, United States	2,807,000	2,891,000	2,949,000	3,140,000	3,180,000	3,212,000	3,276,000	3,276,000	3,301,000	3,367,000	3,384,000	1,717,000	3,012,000	3,193,000	3,000,000	3,000,000

==== EMEA ====
This section lists the top 20 largest amusement parks in Europe, the Middle East and Africa in order of annual attendance in 2024.

Rank	Amusement park	Location	2009	2010	2011	2012	2013	2014	2015	2016	2017	2018	2019	2020	2021	2022	2023	2024
1	Disneyland Park at Disneyland Paris	Marne-la-Vallée, France	12,740,000	10,500,000	10,990,000	11,200,000	10,430,000	9,940,000	9,790,000	8,400,000	9,660,000	9,843,000	9,745,000	2,620,000	3,500,000	9,930,000	10,400,000	10,214,000
2	Europa-Park at Europa-Park Resort	Rust, Germany	4,250,000	4,250,000	4,500,000	4,600,000	4,900,000	5,000,000	5,500,000	5,600,000	5,700,000	5,720,000	5,750,000	2,500,000	3,000,000	5,400,000	6,000,000	6,200,000
3	De Efteling	Kaatsheuvel, Netherlands	4,000,000	4,000,000	4,125,000	4,200,000	4,150,000	4,400,000	4,680,000	4,764,000	5,180,000	5,400,000	5,400,000	2,900,000	3,300,000	5,430,000	5,560,000	5,600,000
4	Disney Adventure World at Disneyland Paris	Marne-la-Vallée, France	2,655,000	4,500,000	4,710,000	4,800,000	4,470,000	4,260,000	4,440,000	4,970,000	5,200,000	5,298,000	5,245,000	1,410,000	1,884,000	5,340,000	5,700,000	5,598,000
5	Tivoli Gardens	Copenhagen, Denmark	3,870,000	3,696,000	3,963,000	4,033,000	4,200,000	4,478,000	4,733,000	4,640,000	4,640,000	4,850,000	4,581,000	1,628,000	2,400,000	3,864,000	4,031,000	4,250,000
6	PortAventura Park at PortAventura World	Salou and Vila-seca, Spain	3,000,000	3,050,000	3,522,000	3,540,000	3,400,000	3,500,000	3,600,000	3,650,000	3,650,000	3,650,000	3,750,000	700,000	2,400,000	3,750,000	3,975,000	3,800,000
7	Gardaland at Gardaland Resort	Castelnuovo del Garda, Italy	2,900,000	2,800,000	2,850,000	2,700,000	2,700,000	2,750,000	2,850,000	2,880,000	2,600,000	2,900,000	2,920,000	1,350,000	2,200,000	2,950,000	3,070,000	3,000,000
8	Parc Astérix	Plailly, France	1,820,000	1,663,000	1,595,000	1,723,000	1,620,000	1,800,000	1,850,000	1,850,000	2,000,000	2,174,000	2,326,000	1,163,000	1,300,000	2,632,000	2,815,000	2,842,000
9	Puy du Fou	Les Epesses, France	—N/a	1,470,000	1,500,000	1,600,000	1,740,000	1,912,000	2,050,000	2,220,000	2,260,000	2,305,000	2,308,000	923,000	1,616,000	2,342,000	2,500,000	2,800,000
10	Alton Towers at Alton Towers Resort	Alton, United Kingdom	2,650,000	2,750,000	2,650,000	2,400,000	2,500,000	2,575,000	1,925,000	1,980,000	2,000,000	2,100,000	2,130,000	670,000	1,800,000	2,300,000	2,350,000	2,500,000
11	Liseberg	Gothenburg, Sweden	3,150,000	2,900,000	2,900,000	2,800,000	2,860,000	3,100,000	3,052,000	3,070,000	3,061,000	3,055,000	2,950,000	—N/a	1,447,000	2,500,000	2,300,000	2,400,000
12	Legoland Windsor	Windsor, United Kingdom	1,900,000	1,900,000	1,900,000	2,000,000	2,050,000	2,200,000	2,250,000	2,183,000	2,200,000	2,315,000	2,430,000	450,000	1,500,000	2,400,000	2,230,000	2,256,000
13	Parque Warner	Madrid, Spain	1,450,000	1,193,000	1,200,000	—N/a	1,160,000	1,460,000	1,641,000	1,800,000	1,840,000	2,185,000	2,232,000	450,000	1,300,000	1,860,000	2,000,000	2,250,000
14	Phantasialand	Brühl, Germany	1,950,000	1,850,000	1,750,000	1,750,000	1,750,000	1,845,000	1,900,000	1,995,000	1,995,000	2,000,000	2,050,000	1,000,000	1,180,000	2,100,000	2,140,000	2,100,000
T15	Futuroscope	Jaunay-Clan, France	1,700,000	1,825,000	1,741,000	1,700,000	1,464,000	1,665,000	1,800,000	1,900,000	2,000,000	1,850,000	1,900,000	900,000	1,100,000	1,920,000	1,975,000	2,050,000
T15	Energylandia	Zator, Poland	—N/a	—N/a	—N/a	—N/a	—N/a	—N/a	—N/a	—N/a	—N/a	—N/a	—N/a	—N/a	—N/a	—N/a	1,600,000	2,050,000
17	Legoland Deutschland	Günzburg, Germany	—N/a	—N/a	—N/a	—N/a	—N/a	—N/a	—N/a	—N/a	2,150,000	2,250,000	1,700,000	750,000	900,000	1,500,000	2,000,000	2,000,000
18	SeaWorld Yas Island, Abu Dhabi	Abu Dhabi, United Arab Emirates	—N/a	—N/a	—N/a	—N/a	—N/a	—N/a	—N/a	—N/a	—N/a	—N/a	—N/a	—N/a	—N/a	—N/a	—N/a	1,750,000
19	Legoland Billund	Billund, Denmark, Denmark	1,650,000	1,650,000	1,600,000	1,650,000	1,800,000	1,925,000	2,050,000	2,091,000	2,120,000	2,250,000	1,950,000	700,000	850,000	2,243,000	1,664,000	1,674,000
T20	Warner Bros. World Abu Dhabi	Abu Dhabi, United Arab Emirates	—N/a	—N/a	—N/a	—N/a	—N/a	—N/a	—N/a	—N/a	—N/a	—N/a	—N/a	—N/a	—N/a	—N/a	1,400,000	1,575,000
T20	Thorpe Park	Chertsey, United Kingdom	1,870,000	1,850,000	1,900,000	1,800,000	2,000,000	2,100,000	1,800,000	1,800,000	1,800,000	1,880,000	1,900,000	600,000	1,700,000	1,600,000	1,712,000	1,575,000

==== Latin America and the Caribbean ====
This section lists the top 10 largest amusement parks in Latin America and the Caribbean in order of annual attendance in 2024.

Rank	Amusement park	Location	2009	2010	2011	2012	2013	2014	2015	2016	2017	2018	2019	2020	2021	2023	2024
1	Beto Carrero World	Penha, Brazil	1,000,000	1,030,000	1,050,000	1,500,000	1,530,000	1,683,000	2,000,000	2,080,000	2,122,000	2,200,000	2,241,000	1,252,000	1,895,000	2,500,000	2,500,000
2	Six Flags México	Mexico City, Mexico	1,950,000	2,000,000	2,200,000	2,310,000	2,345,000	2,368,000	2,368,000	2,486,000	2,610,000	2,789,000	2,803,000	701,000	1,125,000	2,021,000	2,051,000
3	Parque Xcaret	Cancún, Mexico	—N/a	—N/a	—N/a	—N/a	—N/a	—N/a	—N/a	—N/a	1,505,000	1,885,000	1,960,000	736,000	1,104,000	1,637,000	1,580,000
4	Hopi Hari	Vinhedo, Brazil	—N/a	—N/a	—N/a	—N/a	—N/a	—N/a	—N/a	—N/a	—N/a	—N/a	—N/a	—N/a	—N/a	1,039,000	1,295,000
5	Fantasilandia	Santiago, Chile	1,100,000	1,166,000	1,180,000	1,070,000	1,086,000	1,111,000	1,003,000	1,085,000	1,050,000	1,100,000	1,100,000	430,000	615,000	1,015,000	1,150,000
6	Parque Mundo Aventura	Bogotá, Colombia	—N/a	990,000	1,208,000	1,065,000	1,152,000	1,423,000	1,389,000	1,180,000	1,505,000	1,158,000	1,151,000	344,000	631,000	1,015,000	1,131,000
7	Mundo Petapa	Guatemala City, Guatemala	—N/a	—N/a	—N/a	1,253,000	1,056,000	1,138,000	1,199,000	1,220,000	1,239,000	1,226,000	1,330,000	268,000	402,000	912,000	1,012,000
8	Parque del Café	Montenegro, Colombia	—N/a	—N/a	—N/a	—N/a	—N/a	—N/a	1,000,000	1,050,000	966,000	1,028,000	1,043,000	321,000	482,000	845,000	875,000
9	Parque de la Costa	Buenos Aires, Argentina	—N/a	—N/a	—N/a	—N/a	—N/a	—N/a	—N/a	—N/a	—N/a	—N/a	968,000	263,000	395,000	617,000	639,000
10	El Salitre Mágico	Bogotá, Colombia	—N/a	—N/a	—N/a	—N/a	—N/a	—N/a	—N/a	—N/a	—N/a	—N/a	—N/a	—N/a	—N/a	608,000	629,000

==== Asia-Pacific ====
This section lists the top 20 largest amusement parks in the Asia-Pacific region in order of annual attendance in 2024.

Rank	Amusement park	Location	2009	2010	2011	2012	2013	2014	2015	2016	2017	2018	2019	2020	2021	2022	2023	2024
1	Universal Studios Japan	Osaka, Japan	8,000,000	8,160,000	8,500,000	9,700,000	10,100,000	11,800,000	13,900,000	14,500,000	14,935,000	14,300,000	14,500,000	4,901,000	5,500,000	12,350,000	16,000,000	16,000,000
2	Tokyo Disneyland at Tokyo Disney Resort	Urayasu, Chiba, Japan	13,646,000	14,452,000	13,996,000	14,847,000	17,214,000	17,300,000	16,600,000	16,540,000	16,600,000	17,907,000	17,910,000	4,160,000	6,300,000	12,000,000	14,724,000	15,104,000
3	Shanghai Disneyland Park at Shanghai Disneyland Resort	Shanghai, China	—N/a	—N/a	—N/a	—N/a	—N/a	—N/a	—N/a	5,600,000	11,000,000	11,800,000	11,210,000	5,500,000	8,480,000	5,300,000	14,000,000	14,700,000
4	Chimelong Ocean Kingdom	Hengqin, China	—N/a	—N/a	—N/a	—N/a	—N/a	5,504,000	7,486,000	8,474,000	9,788,000	10,830,000	11,736,000	4,797,000	7,452,000	4,400,000	12,520,000	12,628,000
5	Tokyo DisneySea at Tokyo Disney Resort	Urayasu, Chiba, Japan	12,004,000	12,663,000	11,930,000	12,656,000	14,084,000	14,100,000	13,600,000	13,460,000	13,500,000	14,651,000	14,650,000	3,400,000	5,800,000	10,100,000	12,091,000	12,441,000
6	Universal Studios Beijing	Beijing, China	—N/a	—N/a	—N/a	—N/a	—N/a	—N/a	—N/a	—N/a	—N/a	—N/a	—N/a	—N/a	—N/a	—N/a	9,000,000	9,775,000
7	Hong Kong Disneyland at Hong Kong Disneyland Resort	Lantau Island, Hong Kong SAR	4,600,000	5,200,000	5,900,000	6,700,000	7,400,000	7,500,000	6,800,000	6,100,000	6,200,000	6,700,000	5,695,000	1,700,000	2,800,000	3,400,000	7,685,000	7,936,000
8	Everland at Everland Resort	Yongin, South Korea	6,169,000	6,884,000	6,570,000	6,853,000	7,303,000	7,381,000	7,423,000	7,200,000	6,310,000	5,850,000	6,606,000	2,760,000	3,710,000	5,770,000	5,880,000	5,598,000
9	China Dinosaurs Park	Changzhou, China	—N/a	—N/a	—N/a	—N/a	—N/a	—N/a	—N/a	—N/a	3,210,000	4,106,000	4,434,000	2,375,000	2,500,000	2,200,000	4,300,000	5,380,000
10	Lotte World	Seoul, South Korea	4,261,000	5,551,000	5,780,000	6,383,000	7,400,000	7,606,000	7,310,000	8,150,000	6,714,000	5,960,000	5,953,000	1,560,000	2,460,000	4,520,000	5,190,000	5,300,000
11	Shanghai Haichang Ocean Park	Shanghai, China	—N/a	—N/a	—N/a	—N/a	—N/a	—N/a	—N/a	—N/a	—N/a	—N/a	—N/a	—N/a	—N/a	—N/a	4,290,000	4,730,000
12	Chimelong Spaceship	Hengqin, China	—N/a	—N/a	—N/a	—N/a	—N/a	—N/a	—N/a	—N/a	—N/a	—N/a	—N/a	—N/a	—N/a	—N/a	1,356,000	4,627,000
13	Nanning Fantawild Asian Legend	Nanning, China	—N/a	—N/a	—N/a	—N/a	—N/a	—N/a	—N/a	—N/a	—N/a	—N/a	—N/a	—N/a	—N/a	—N/a	4,703,000	4,601,000
14	Jingzhou Fantawild Oriental Heritage	Jingzhou, China	—N/a	—N/a	—N/a	—N/a	—N/a	—N/a	—N/a	—N/a	—N/a	—N/a	—N/a	—N/a	—N/a	—N/a	4,610,000	4,474,000
15	Mianyang Fantawild Oriental Heritage	Mianyang, China	—N/a	—N/a	—N/a	—N/a	—N/a	—N/a	—N/a	—N/a	—N/a	—N/a	—N/a	—N/a	—N/a	—N/a	4,620,000	4,328,000
16	Zhengzhou Fantawild Adventure	Zhengzhou, China	—N/a	—N/a	—N/a	—N/a	—N/a	—N/a	—N/a	—N/a	—N/a	—N/a	—N/a	—N/a	—N/a	—N/a	4,430,000	4,276,000
17	Taiyuan Fantawild Oriental Heritage	Taiyuan, China	—N/a	—N/a	—N/a	—N/a	—N/a	—N/a	—N/a	—N/a	—N/a	—N/a	—N/a	—N/a	—N/a	—N/a	4,230,000	4,107,000
18	Chimelong Paradise	Guangzhou, China	2,400,000	2,400,000	2,700,000	2,970,000	3,200,000	3,351,000	3,619,000	3,836,000	4,181,000	4,680,000	4,905,000	2,681,000	3,890,000	2,300,000	5,580,000	4,100,000
19	Tianjin Fantawild Adventure	Tianjin, China	—N/a	—N/a	—N/a	—N/a	—N/a	—N/a	—N/a	—N/a	—N/a	—N/a	—N/a	—N/a	—N/a	—N/a	4,087,000	4,011,000
20	Shenyang Fantawild Adventure	Shenyang, China	—N/a	—N/a	—N/a	—N/a	—N/a	—N/a	—N/a	—N/a	—N/a	—N/a	—N/a	—N/a	—N/a	—N/a	4,200,000	3,979,000

=== Water parks ===
==== Worldwide ====
This section lists the top 20 largest water parks worldwide in order of annual attendance in 2024.

Rank	Water park	Location	2009	2010	2011	2012	2013	2014	2015	2016	2017	2018	2019	2020	2023	2024
1	Chimelong Water Park	Guangzhou, China	1,800,000	1,800,000	1,900,000	2,021,000	2,172,000	2,259,000	2,352,000	2,538,000	2,690,000	2,740,000	3,014,000	1,512,000	2,807,000	2,810,000
2	Aquaventure World	Dubai, United Arab Emirates	—N/a	1,040,000	1,200,000	1,300,000	1,200,000	1,400,000	1,400,000	1,430,000	1,350,000	1,397,000	1,322,000	600,000	1,800,000	2,000,000
3	Therme Erding	Erding, Germany	—N/a	—N/a	—N/a	—N/a	1,000,000	1,000,000	1,235,000	1,245,000	1,320,000	1,500,000	1,850,000	750,000	1,860,000	1,910,000
4	Thermas dos Laranjais	Olímpia, Brazil	—N/a	—N/a	—N/a	1,300,000	1,650,000	1,939,000	1,761,000	1,959,000	2,007,000	1,971,000	1,845,000	922,500	1,954,000	1,850,000
5	Typhoon Lagoon at Walt Disney World Resort	Lake Buena Vista, Florida, United States	—N/a	—N/a	—N/a	—N/a	—N/a	—N/a	—N/a	—N/a	—N/a	—N/a	—N/a	—N/a	1,898,000	1,817,000
6	Aquaventure at Atlantis Paradise Island	Nassau, Bahamas	—N/a	—N/a	—N/a	—N/a	—N/a	1,850,000	1,868,000	1,868,000	1,831,000	1,831,000	1,813,000	494,000	1,891,000	1,790,000
T7	Aquaventure Waterpark	Sanya, China	—N/a	—N/a	—N/a	—N/a	—N/a	—N/a	—N/a	—N/a	—N/a	—N/a	1,200,000	1,200,000	1,600,000	1,650,000
T7	Universal Volcano Bay at Universal Orlando Resort	Orlando, Florida, United States	—N/a	—N/a	—N/a	—N/a	—N/a	—N/a	—N/a	—N/a	1,500,000	1,725,000	1,811,000	551,000	1,800,000	1,650,000
9	Therme Bucharest	Bucharest, Romania	—N/a	—N/a	—N/a	—N/a	—N/a	—N/a	—N/a	—N/a	—N/a	—N/a	—N/a	—N/a	1,520,000	1,610,000
10	Aquatica	Orlando, Florida, United States	1,600,000	1,500,000	1,500,000	1,538,000	1,553,000	1,569,000	1,600,000	1,536,000	1,382,000	1,556,000	1,533,000	528,000	1,437,000	1,435,000
11	Hot Park	Caldas Novas, Brazil	—N/a	—N/a	—N/a	—N/a	1,284,000	1,288,000	1,288,000	1,381,000	1,481,000	1,433,000	1,469,000	734,500	1,600,000	1,427,000
12	Sunway Lagoon	Kuala Lumpur, Malaysia	907,000	1,000,000	1,040,000	1,200,000	1,100,000	1,100,000	1,077,000	1,270,000	1,300,000	1,300,000	1,200,000	600,000	1,200,000	1,300,000
13	Siam Park	Santa Cruz de Tenerife, Spain	—N/a	—N/a	—N/a	—N/a	—N/a	—N/a	—N/a	—N/a	—N/a	—N/a	—N/a	—N/a	1,200,000	1,270,000
14	Tropical Islands	Krausnick-Groß Wasserburg, Germany	—N/a	—N/a	—N/a	—N/a	—N/a	910,000	1,002,000	1,133,000	1,168,000	1,200,000	1,233,000	493,000	1,200,000	1,250,000
15	Rulantica	Rust, Germany	—N/a	—N/a	—N/a	—N/a	—N/a	—N/a	—N/a	—N/a	—N/a	—N/a	—N/a	—N/a	1,200,000	1,230,000
16	Caribbean Bay	Yongin, South Korea	—N/a	—N/a	—N/a	—N/a	—N/a	—N/a	—N/a	—N/a	—N/a	—N/a	—N/a	—N/a	1,270,000	1,151,000
17	Water World at Aquapalace	Prague, Czech Republic	—N/a	—N/a	—N/a	—N/a	—N/a	845,000	997,000	1,023,000	1,215,000	1,288,000	1,300,000	537,000	1,108,000	1,141,000
18	Hot Beach	Olímpia, Brazil	—N/a	—N/a	—N/a	—N/a	—N/a	—N/a	—N/a	—N/a	—N/a	—N/a	—N/a	—N/a	1,066,000	1,122,000
19	Hacienda Nápoles Theme Park	Medellín, Colombia	—N/a	—N/a	—N/a	—N/a	—N/a	—N/a	—N/a	—N/a	—N/a	—N/a	—N/a	—N/a	1,200,000	1,096,000
20	Parque Acuático Xocomil	San Martín Zapotitlán, Guatemala	—N/a	—N/a	—N/a	—N/a	—N/a	—N/a	—N/a	—N/a	—N/a	—N/a	—N/a	—N/a	900,000	1,078,000

==== North America ====
This section lists the top 20 water parks in North America in order of annual attendance in 2024.

Rank	Water park	Location	2009	2010	2011	2012	2013	2014	2015	2016	2017	2018	2019	2020	2023	2024
1	Typhoon Lagoon at Walt Disney World Resort	Lake Buena Vista, Florida, United States	2,059,000	2,059,000	2,038,000	2,058,000	2,100,000	2,142,000	2,294,000	2,277,000	2,163,000	2,271,000	2,248,000	—N/a	1,898,000	1,817,000
2	Universal Volcano Bay at Universal Orlando Resort	Orlando, Florida, United States	—N/a	—N/a	—N/a	—N/a	—N/a	—N/a	—N/a	—N/a	1,500,000	1,725,000	1,811,000	551,000	1,800,000	1,650,000
3	Aquatica	Orlando, Florida, United States	1,600,000	1,500,000	1,500,000	1,538,000	1,553,000	1,569,000	1,600,000	1,536,000	1,382,000	1,556,000	1,533,000	528,000	1,437,000	1,435,000
4	Schlitterbahn	New Braunfels, Texas, United States	882,000	900,000	882,000	982,000	1,017,000	1,037,000	1,037,000	1,037,000	1,006,000	1,016,000	996,000	451,000	933,000	919,000
5	Blizzard Beach at Walt Disney World Resort	Lake Buena Vista, Florida, United States	1,891,000	1,891,000	1,872,000	1,891,000	1,929,000	1,968,000	2,107,000	2,091,000	1,945,000	2,003,000	1,983,000	316,000	910,000	897,000
6	Water Country USA	Williamsburg, Virginia, United States	758,000	700,000	784,000	723,000	748,000	726,000	726,000	733,000	711,000	729,000	736,000	—N/a	736,000	730,000
7	Aquatica San Antonio	San Antonio, Texas, United States	—N/a	—N/a	—N/a	—N/a	—N/a	—N/a	—N/a	—N/a	625,000	645,000	651,000	263,000	650,000	652,000
8	Adventure Island	Tampa, Florida, United States	—N/a	—N/a	—N/a	—N/a	651,000	638,000	663,000	650,000	631,000	669,000	656,000	125,000	640,000	633,000
9	Schlitterbahn	Galveston, Texas, United States	—N/a	—N/a	—N/a	—N/a	546,000	546,000	551,000	562,000	545,000	559,000	567,000	337,000	539,000	512,000
10	Knott's Soak City	Buena Park, California, United States	—N/a	—N/a	—N/a	—N/a	—N/a	—N/a	—N/a	—N/a	—N/a	—N/a	—N/a	—N/a	475,000	487,000
11	Six Flags Hurricane Harbor	Arlington, Texas, United States	—N/a	—N/a	—N/a	—N/a	508,000	518,000	549,000	549,000	533,000	533,000	538,000	235,000	476,000	469,000
12	Six Flags Hurricane Harbor	Jackson, New Jersey, United States	—N/a	—N/a	—N/a	—N/a	424,000	423,000	440,000	449,000	440,000	475,000	482,000	85,000	450,000	464,000
13	Six Flags Hurricane Harbor Phoenix	Glendale, Arizona, United States	—N/a	—N/a	—N/a	—N/a	—N/a	—N/a	—N/a	—N/a	—N/a	—N/a	441,000	—N/a	450,000	457,000
14	Six Flags Hurricane Harbor Los Angeles	Valencia, California, United States	—N/a	—N/a	—N/a	—N/a	—N/a	—N/a	—N/a	—N/a	—N/a	—N/a	—N/a	—N/a	440,000	447,000
15	Zoombezi Bay	Powell, Ohio, United States	—N/a	—N/a	—N/a	—N/a	—N/a	—N/a	—N/a	—N/a	386,000	438,000	466,000	176,000	411,000	440,000
16	Cedar Point Shores	Sandusky, Ohio, United States	—N/a	—N/a	—N/a	—N/a	—N/a	—N/a	—N/a	392,000	412,000	420,000	424,000	—N/a	400,000	410,000
17	Dollywood's Splash Country	Pigeon Forge, Tennessee, United States	—N/a	—N/a	—N/a	—N/a	—N/a	408,000	416,000	416,000	424,000	437,000	433,000	188,000	379,000	375,000
18	Discovery Cove	Orlando, Florida, United States	—N/a	—N/a	—N/a	—N/a	—N/a	—N/a	—N/a	—N/a	—N/a	—N/a	—N/a	—N/a	363,000	369,000
19	Camelbeach Outdoor Waterpark	Tannersville, Pennsylvania, United States	—N/a	—N/a	—N/a	—N/a	367,000	367,000	437,000	437,000	424,000	437,000	439,000	151,000	366,000	359,000
20	Six Flags White Water	Marietta, Georgia, United States	—N/a	—N/a	—N/a	—N/a	505,000	505,000	541,000	568,000	559,000	531,000	526,000	238,000	373,000	356,000

==== Latin America and the Caribbean ====
This section lists the top 10 water parks in Latin America and the Caribbean in order of annual attendance in 2024.

Rank	Water park	Location	2012	2013	2014	2015	2016	2017	2018	2019	2020	2023	2024
1	Thermas dos Laranjais	Olímpia, Brazil	1,300,000	1,650,000	1,939,000	1,761,000	1,959,000	2,007,000	1,971,000	1,845,000	922,500	1,954,000	1,850,000
2	Aquaventure at Atlantis Paradise Island	Nassau, Bahamas	—N/a	—N/a	1,850,000	1,868,000	1,868,000	1,831,000	1,831,000	1,813,000	494,000	1,891,000	1,790,000
3	Hot Park	Caldas Novas, Brazil	—N/a	1,284,000	1,288,000	1,288,000	1,381,000	1,481,000	1,433,000	1,469,000	734,500	1,600,000	1,427,000
4	Hot Beach	Olímpia, Brazil	—N/a	—N/a	—N/a	—N/a	—N/a	243,000	462,000	608,000	243,200	1,066,000	1,122,000
5	Hacienda Nápoles Theme Park	Medellín, Colombia	—N/a	—N/a	—N/a	—N/a	—N/a	—N/a	—N/a	—N/a	—N/a	1,200,000	1,096,000
6	Parque Acuático Xocomil	San Martín Zapotitlán, Guatemala	—N/a	786,000	767,000	940,000	838,000	827,000	840,000	894,000	121,000	900,000	1,078,000
7	Thermas de São Pedro	São Pedro, Brazil	—N/a	—N/a	—N/a	255,000	330,000	392,000	481,000	641,000	315,000	867,000	900,000
8	Beach Park	Aquiraz, Brazil	843,000	964,000	949,000	970,000	1,044,000	1,028,000	950,000	890,000	312,000	800,000	850,000
9	Magic City Water Park	Suzano, Brazil	—N/a	—N/a	—N/a	—N/a	—N/a	—N/a	—N/a	681,000	355,000	763,000	732,000
10	Piscilago	Girardot, Colombia	1,033,000	1,035,000	1,018,000	1,007,000	970,000	989,000	990,000	876,000	307,000	914,000	702,000

==== Asia-Pacific ====
This section lists the top 20 water parks in Asia-Pacific in order of annual attendance in 2024.

Rank	Water park	Location	2009	2010	2011	2012	2013	2014	2015	2016	2017	2018	2019	2020	2023	2024
1	Chimelong Water Park	Guangzhou, China	1,800,000	1,800,000	1,900,000	2,021,000	2,172,000	2,259,000	2,352,000	2,538,000	2,690,000	2,740,000	3,014,000	1,512,000	2,807,000	2,810,000
2	Aquaventure Waterpark	Sanya, China	—N/a	—N/a	—N/a	—N/a	—N/a	—N/a	—N/a	—N/a	—N/a	—N/a	1,200,000	1,200,000	1,600,000	1,650,000
3	Sunway Lagoon	Kuala Lumpur, Malaysia	907,000	1,000,000	1,040,000	1,200,000	1,100,000	1,100,000	1,077,000	1,270,000	1,300,000	1,300,000	1,200,000	600,000	1,200,000	1,300,000
4	Caribbean Bay	Yongin, South Korea	1,450,000	1,736,000	1,497,000	1,508,000	1,623,000	1,493,000	1,434,000	1,550,000	1,380,000	1,200,000	1,333,000	168,000	1,270,000	1,151,000
5	Wet'n'Wild Gold Coast	Oxenford, Queensland, Australia	1,095,000	1,175,000	1,200,000	1,200,000	1,409,000	1,200,000	1,200,000	1,242,000	1,180,000	1,120,000	1,120,000	952,000	1,050,000	1,051,000
6	Ocean World	Hongcheon, South Korea	1,310,000	1,375,000	1,726,000	1,720,000	1,700,000	1,604,000	1,509,000	1,473,000	1,330,000	1,264,000	1,071,000	180,000	960,000	947,000
7	Poseidon Beach Water World	Harbin, China	—N/a	—N/a	—N/a	—N/a	—N/a	—N/a	—N/a	—N/a	—N/a	—N/a	—N/a	—N/a	895,000	906,000
8	Summerland	Tokyo, Japan	920,000	925,000	850,000	990,000	939,000	884,000	915,000	862,000	812,000	820,000	868,000	454,000	870,000	895,000
9	Sunway Lost World of Tambun	Perak, Malaysia	—N/a	—N/a	—N/a	—N/a	500,000	700,000	859,000	1,000,000	1,000,000	1,000,000	1,000,000	600,000	800,000	830,000
10	The Jungle Water Adventure	Bogor, Indonesia	—N/a	—N/a	—N/a	—N/a	—N/a	—N/a	571,000	815,000	910,000	783,000	785,000	200,000	674,000	795,000
11	Wuhu Fantawild Water Park	Wuhu, China	—N/a	—N/a	—N/a	—N/a	—N/a	309,000	708,000	1,024,000	1,204,000	1,360,000	1,348,000	770,800	922,000	744,000
12	Zhengzhou Fantawild Water Park	Zhengzhou, China	—N/a	—N/a	—N/a	—N/a	—N/a	220,000	694,000	802,000	898,000	910,000	905,000	622,300	783,000	739,000
13	Xiamen Fantawild Waterpark	Xiamen, China	—N/a	—N/a	—N/a	—N/a	—N/a	—N/a	—N/a	—N/a	—N/a	—N/a	832,000	442,000	905,000	724,000
14	SplashMania Waterpark at Gamuda Cove	Kuala Lumpur, Malaysia	—N/a	—N/a	—N/a	—N/a	—N/a	—N/a	—N/a	—N/a	—N/a	—N/a	—N/a	—N/a	202,000	705,000
15	Adventure Cove Waterpark	Sentosa, Singapore	—N/a	—N/a	—N/a	—N/a	648,000	614,000	660,000	660,000	680,000	700,000	710,000	300,000	580,000	650,000
16	Lotte Water Park	Gimhae, South Korea	—N/a	—N/a	—N/a	—N/a	—N/a	—N/a	—N/a	—N/a	—N/a	—N/a	—N/a	—N/a	614,000	551,000
17	Playa Maya Water Park	Shanghai, China	—N/a	—N/a	—N/a	—N/a	740,000	540,000	708,000	870,000	890,000	990,000	970,000	860,000	740,000	530,000
18	Atlantis Water Adventure	Jakarta, Indonesia	720,000	850,000	950,000	1,000,000	980,000	960,000	970,000	1,110,000	885,000	907,000	910,000	220,000	657,000	517,000
19	Legoland Malaysia Water Park	Johor Bahru, Malaysia	—N/a	—N/a	—N/a	—N/a	—N/a	—N/a	—N/a	—N/a	—N/a	—N/a	—N/a	—N/a	465,000	490,000
20	Playa Maya Water Park	Wuhan, China	—N/a	—N/a	—N/a	—N/a	—N/a	—N/a	730,000	690,000	700,000	1,080,000	1,210,000	930,000	490,000	430,000

==== EMEA ====
This section lists the top 10 water parks in Europe, the Middle East and Africa in order of annual attendance in 2024.

Rank	Water park	Location	2009	2010	2011	2012	2013	2014	2015	2016	2017	2018	2019	2020	2023	2024
1	Aquaventure World	Dubai, United Arab Emirates	—N/a	1,040,000	1,200,000	1,300,000	1,200,000	1,400,000	1,400,000	1,430,000	1,350,000	1,397,000	1,322,000	600,000	1,800,000	2,000,000
2	Therme Erding	Erding, Germany	—N/a	—N/a	—N/a	—N/a	1,000,000	1,000,000	1,235,000	1,245,000	1,320,000	1,500,000	1,850,000	750,000	1,860,000	1,910,000
3	Therme Bucharest	Bucharest, Romania	—N/a	—N/a	—N/a	—N/a	—N/a	—N/a	—N/a	—N/a	—N/a	—N/a	—N/a	—N/a	1,520,000	1,610,000
4	Siam Park	Santa Cruz de Tenerife, Spain	—N/a	—N/a	800,000	800,000	—N/a	850,000	865,000	1,000,000	1,209,000	1,210,000	1,200,000	97,000	1,200,000	1,270,000
5	Tropical Islands	Krausnick-Groß Wasserburg, Germany	—N/a	—N/a	—N/a	—N/a	—N/a	910,000	1,002,000	1,133,000	1,168,000	1,200,000	1,233,000	493,000	1,200,000	1,250,000
6	Rulantica	Rust, Germany	—N/a	—N/a	—N/a	—N/a	—N/a	—N/a	—N/a	—N/a	—N/a	—N/a	—N/a	—N/a	1,200,000	1,230,000
7	Aquapalace	Prague, Czech Republic	—N/a	—N/a	—N/a	—N/a	—N/a	845,000	997,000	1,023,000	1,215,000	1,288,000	1,300,000	537,000	1,108,000	1,141,000
8	Aqualand Moravia	Pasohlávky, Czech Republic	—N/a	—N/a	—N/a	—N/a	—N/a	—N/a	—N/a	—N/a	712,400	720,000	806,000	368,000	835,000	863,000
9	Lalandia	Billund, Denmark, Denmark	—N/a	—N/a	—N/a	—N/a	—N/a	680,000	680,000	692,000	680,000	682,000	682,000	240,000	800,000	790,000
10	Nettebad	Osnabrück, Germany	—N/a	—N/a	—N/a	—N/a	—N/a	660,000	744,000	729,000	744,000	758,000	756,000	311,000	720,000	717,000

== Other rankings ==
=== Number of operating roller coasters ===
Amusement parks that contain the most roller coasters are ranked below.

As of October 1, 2026:

Amusement parks with the most roller coasters
Rank	Park	Location	Opened	Coasters	Owner	Ref(s)
1	Energylandia	Zator, Lesser Poland, Poland	2014	19	Marek Goczał	
2	Canada's Wonderland	Vaughan, Ontario, Canada	1981	18	Six Flags	
2	Cedar Point	Sandusky, Ohio, United States	1870	18	Six Flags	
4	Six Flags Great America	Gurnee, Illinois, United States	1976	16	Six Flags	
4	Six Flags Magic Mountain	Valencia, California, United States	1971	16	Six Flags	

== See also ==
- List of roller coaster rankings
- List of amusement parks
