= Guangzhou Chimelong Tourist Resort =

Theme park in Guangzhou, China

Coordinates: 23°00′13″N 113°19′20″E

- Simplified Chinese: 广州长隆旅游度假区
- Traditional Chinese: 廣州長隆旅遊度假區
Transcriptions
Standard Mandarin
- Hanyu Pinyin: Guǎngzhōu Chánglóng Lǚyóu Dùjiàqū
Yue: Cantonese
- Jyutping: gwong2 zau1 coeng4 lung4 leoi5 jau4 dou6 gaa3 keoi1

Guangzhou Chimelong Tourist Resort (Chinese: 广州长隆旅游度假区) is a theme park resort located in Guangzhou, Guangdong, China and owned by Chimelong Group. The resort currently consists of one theme park, one circus venue, two zoological parks, one waterpark, and three hotels.

== Parks ==
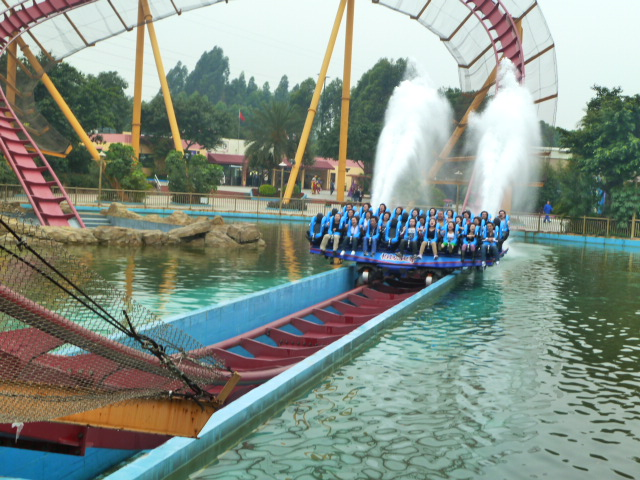
Dive coaster making a splash down at Chimelong Paradise

=== Chimelong Paradise ===
Chimelong Paradise, the resort's flagship park, is one of China's largest and most popular theme parks and currently features more than 60 attractions.

=== Chimelong Water Park ===
Chimelong Water Park is the most visited waterpark in the world.

=== Chimelong Safari Park ===
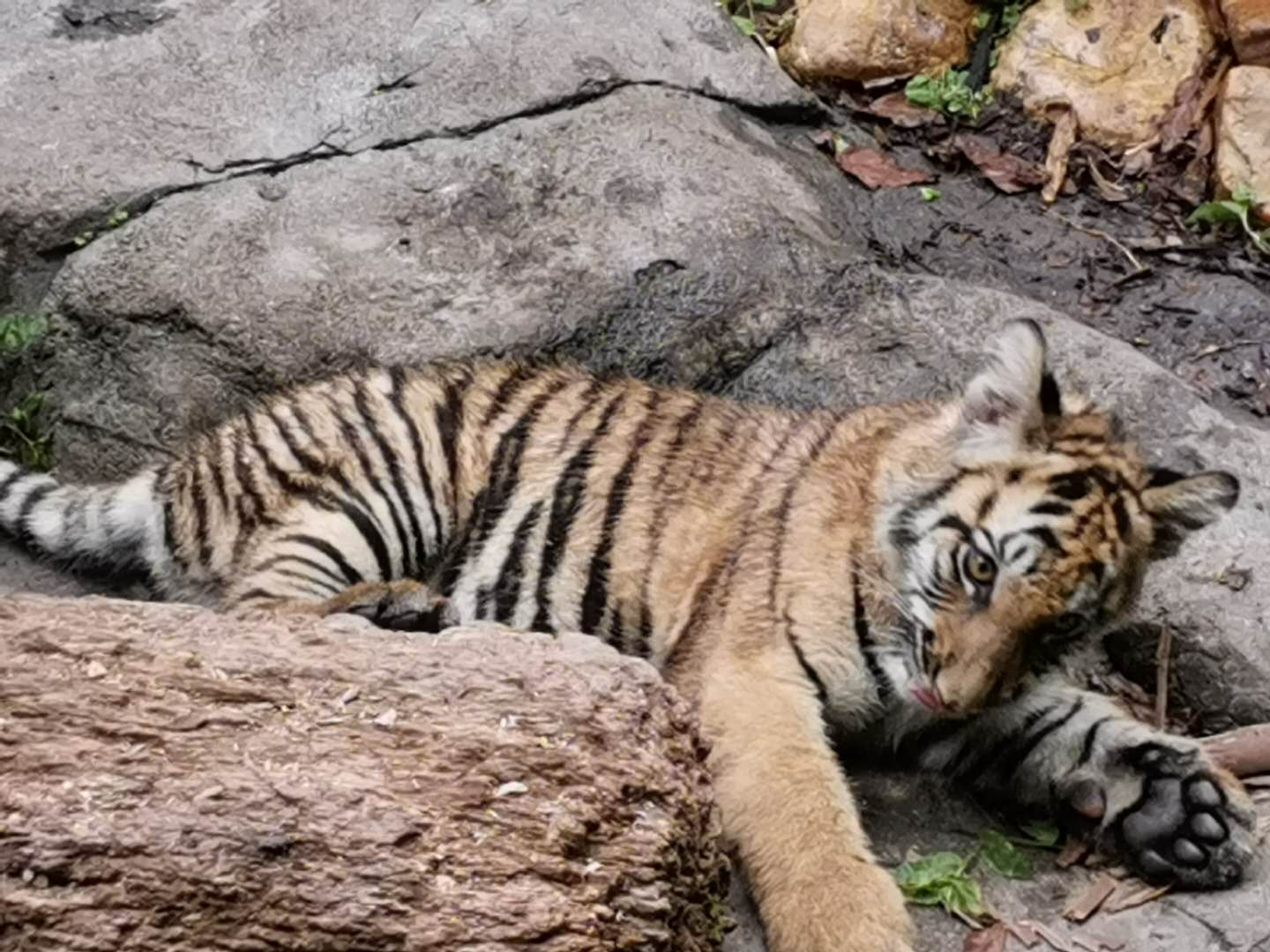
A little tiger playing at the park

Chimelong Safari Park is an expansive zoological park featuring many rare animals from around the world.

=== Chimelong Birds Park ===
Chimelong Birds Park is a zoological park primarily displaying birds.

== Entertainment Venue ==
Performances of the Chimelong International Circus take place daily at Guangzhou Chimelong Tourist Resort's large indoor theater.

== Hotels ==
There are three hotels on site:

- Chimelong Hotel – The resort's main hotel with 1,500 eco-themed rooms and suites and nine dining locations
- Chimelong Panda Hotel – 1500 rooms themed to a Chinese cartoon about panda cub triplets
- Panyu Xiangjiang Hotel – 150 rooms plus multipurpose meeting rooms
