= Chimelong International Ocean Tourist Resort =

Theme park in Hengqin, Zhuhai, China

Coordinates: 22.1001°N 113.53°E

- Simplified Chinese: 珠海长隆国际海洋度假区
- Traditional Chinese: 珠海長隆國際海洋度假區
Transcriptions
Standard Mandarin
- Hanyu Pinyin: Zhūhǎi Chánglóng Lǚyóu Guójì Hǎiyáng Dùjiàqū
Yue: Cantonese
- Jyutping: zyu1 hoi2 coeng4 lung4 gwok3 zai3 hoi2 joeng4 dou6 gaa3 keoi1

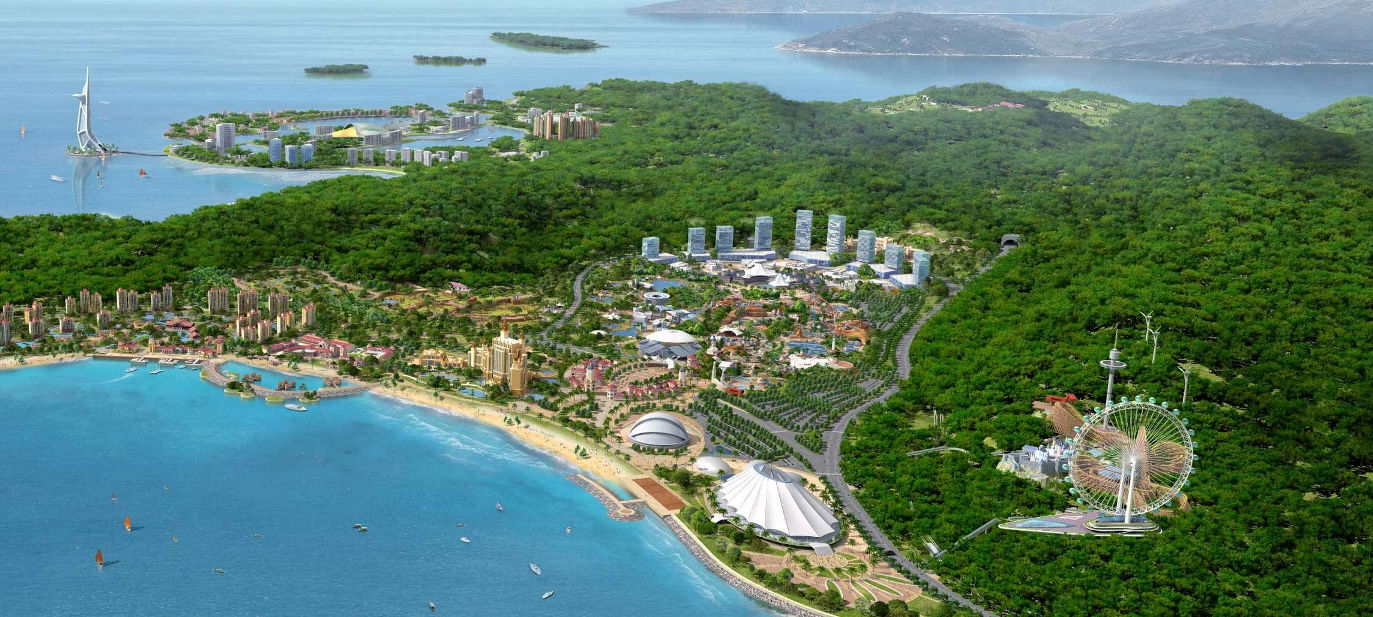
Artist's impression of the completed resort.

Chimelong International Ocean Tourist Resort (Chinese: 珠海长隆国际海洋度假区) is a theme park resort located in Hengqin, Zhuhai, China and owned by Chimelong Group. The resort currently consists of two theme parks, two theaters and four themed hotels. With a 20 billion yuan investment, future plans for the resort include at least two additional theme parks, a new aerial tramway transportation system, and an artificial island. Chimelong expects visitation at Chimelong International Ocean Resort to increase to over 50 million annually once all of the theme parks are operating.

== Theme parks ==
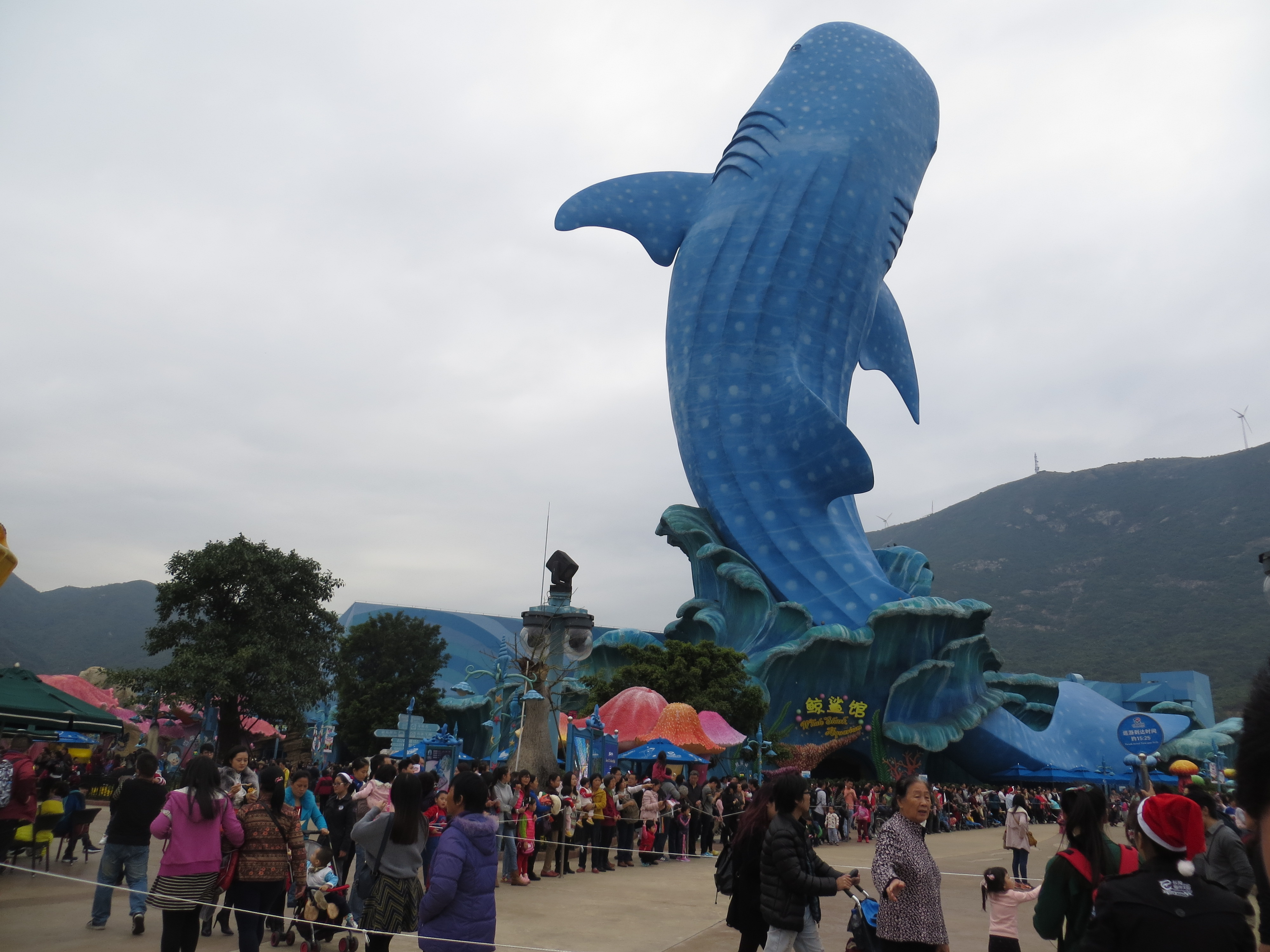
The Whale Shark Aquarium at Chimelong Ocean Kingdom

=== Chimelong Ocean Kingdom ===
Chimelong Ocean Kingdom, designed by PGAV Destinations, is the resort's first theme park. The soft opening took place in January 2014 and the park officially opened in March 2014.

=== Chimelong Spaceship ===
Chimelong Spaceship is the second theme park to open at Chimelong International Ocean Tourist Resort. This ocean-themed park masterplanned by Legacy Entertainment is the world's largest indoor theme park and world's largest aquarium. Construction on the park began on 30 November 2015, and it opened in 2023.

Its currently the world's largest indoor theme park featuring over 30 amusement facilities and around 17 major rides and simulator attractions.

=== Chimelong Adventure Park ===
Chimelong Adventure Park is the planned third theme park at Chimelong International Ocean Tourist Resort. This outdoor theme park will be located at the peak of Hengqin Island's mountain range. The theme park will be accessed by aerial tramway. Early plans for this theme park included a wooden roller coaster, observation wheel, and observation tower.

=== Chimelong Animal Kingdom ===
Chimelong Animal Kingdom, a fourth theme park planned for the resort features day time and night time safari components centered around live animals, with masterplan design by Dan Pearlman.

== Entertainment venues ==
Hengqin Island Theater is a large indoor theater located at the center of Chimelong International Ocean Tourist Resort. Performances of Chimelong Hengqin International Circus City take place at the venue every evening and the theater hosts the annual China International Circus Festival.

A new, larger indoor theater named The Chimelong Theatre opened on 26 July 2019, becoming the resort's primary circus theater venue.

== Chimelong Fortune Island Reclamation Project ==
In July 2017, Chimelong Group submitted to the local government plans to build an artificial island off the coast of Hengqin Island. Plans for the island include a marine theater and marine museum. Early design plans for Chimelong International Ocean Tourist Resort show the island having a large marina.

== Transportation systems ==
Chimelong International Ocean Tourist Resort is primarily accessed by bus or car and guests travel around the property by walking or by taking a boat ride on the resort's central canal.

=== Canal boat ride ===
Small boats for guests travel on a canal located at the center of the resort. Guests can board and debark the boats at Chimelong Hengqin Bay Hotel, Hengqin Island Theater and Chimelong Penguin Hotel.

=== China Railway ===
- Zhuhai Changlong railway station, a station on Zhuji intercity railway, is located near the resort. It is operated by China Railway Guangzhou Group.

=== Aerial lift ===
In December 2017, an article written about Chimelong Group's founder, Su Zhigang, revealed plans for an aerial lift at Chimelong International Ocean Tourist Resort. The aerial lift system will be manufactured by Poma and the stations will be located near Chimelong Ocean Kingdom, Chimelong Adventure Park, and Chimelong Marine Science Park. The first license for one of the aerial lift's stations was approved by the local government in December 2018.

== Hotels ==
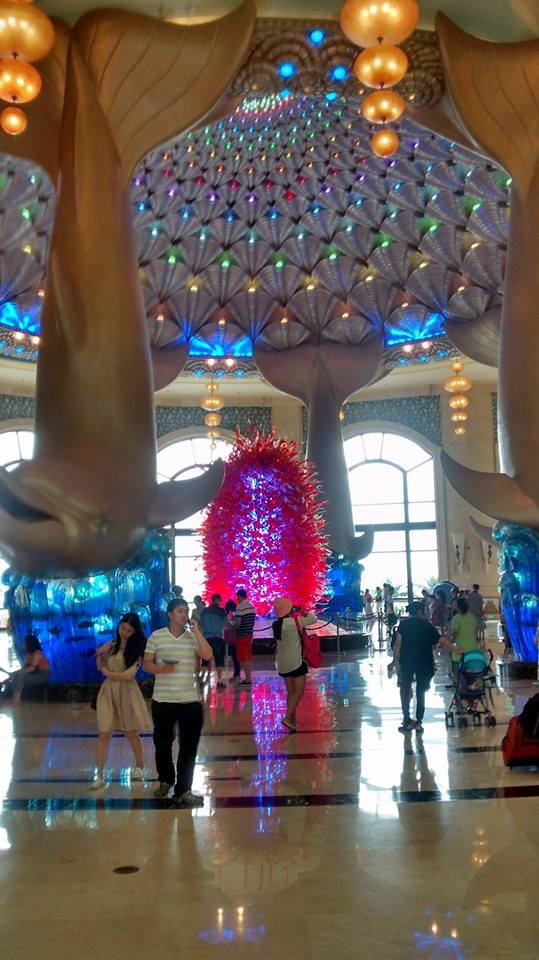
Chimelong Hengqin Bay Hotel

There are three hotels on site with a fourth currently under construction:

- Chimelong Hengqin Bay Hotel – 1,888-room hotel. Chimelong Hengqin Bay Hotel was awarded the World's Leading Themed Hotel in the 2015 World Travel Awards (WTA).
- Chimelong Circus Hotel – 700-room hotel. Opened on 19 February 2015.

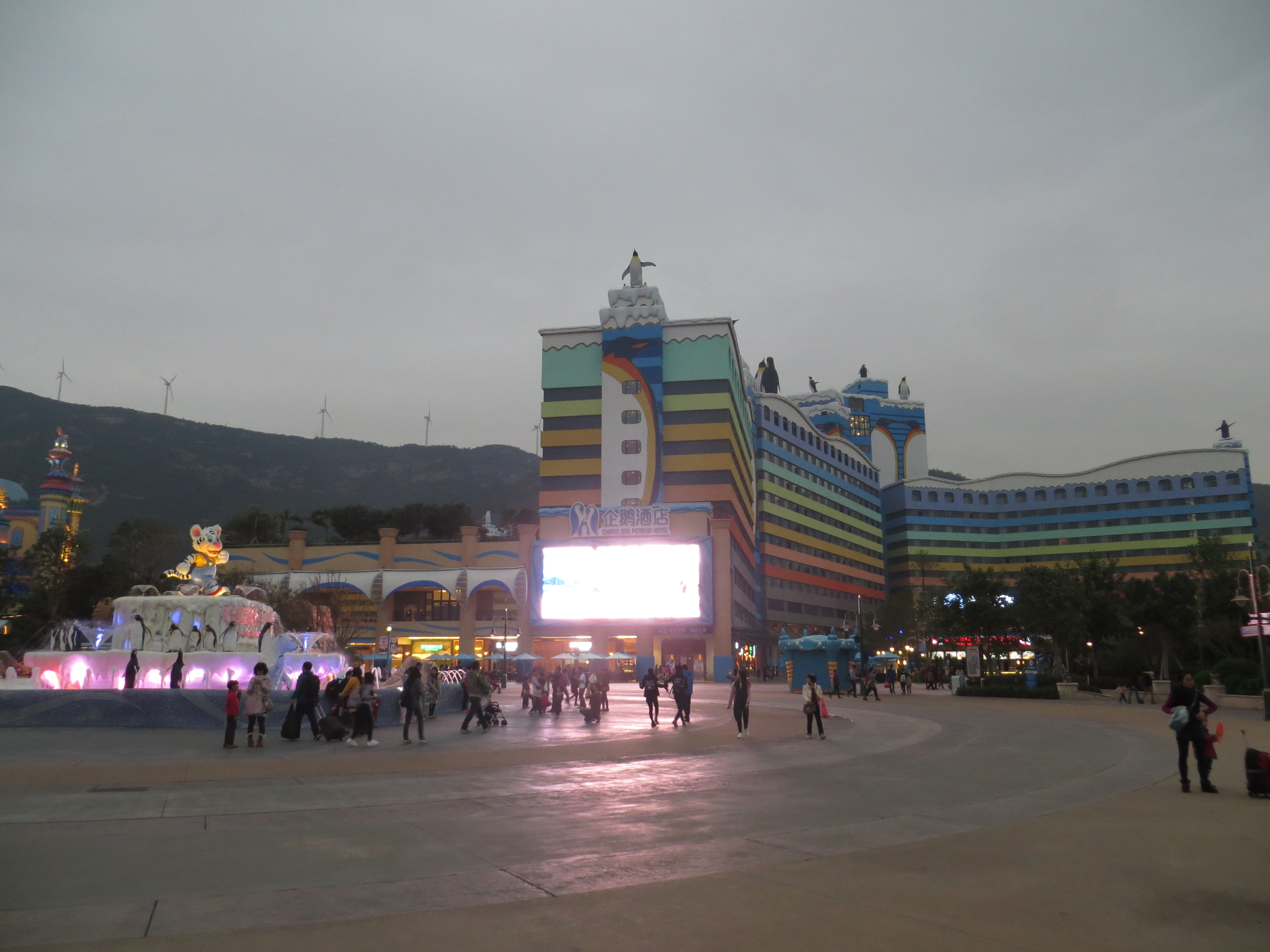
Chimelong Penguin Hotel

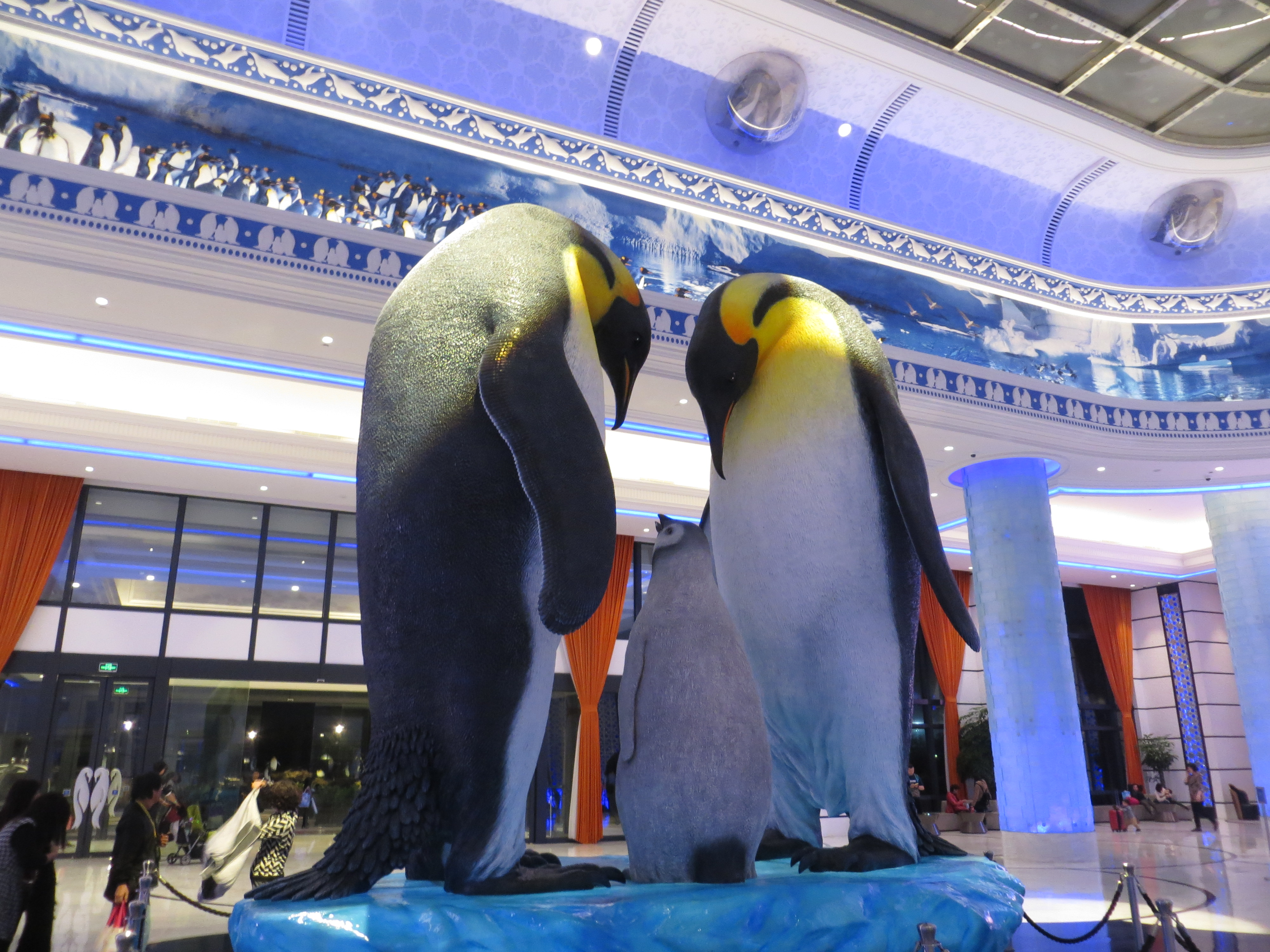
Chimelong Penguin Hotel lobby

- Chimelong Penguin Hotel – 2,000-room hotel with "Emperor Penguin Cafeteria" that enables guests to enjoy meals while observing penguins in proximity. Opened on 19 February 2015.
- Chimelong Spaceship Hotel – Modern 26 floor tower that includes restaurants, conference rooms, swimming pools, and retail stores. Connected to the back of Chimelong Spaceship.
