= Chimelong =

Chinese theme park company

Chimelong Group Co., Ltd
- Type: Private
- Industry: Amusement parks, hospitality, restaurants, tourism, cultural industry
- Founded: Guangzhou, Guangdong, China; 1989; 37 years ago
- Headquarters: Guangzhou, China
- Area served: Guangdong area
- Number of employees: 10,000
- Website: Chimelong Group

ChimeLong Group Co., Ltd
- Simplified Chinese: 广州长隆集团有限公司
- Traditional Chinese: 廣州長隆集團有限公司
- Literal meaning: Guangzhou ChimeLong Group Co., Ltd
Transcriptions
Standard Mandarin
- Hanyu Pinyin: Guǎngzhōu Chánglóng Jítuán Yǒuxiàngōngsī
Yue: Cantonese
- Jyutping: gwong2 zau1 coeng4 lung4 zaap6 tyun4 jau5 haan6 gung1 si1

Former Chimelong logo.

Chimelong Group Co., Ltd. (Chinese: 长隆集团; pinyin: Chánglóng Jítuán; Jyutping: coeng4 lung4 zaap6 tyun4) is a Chinese company that owns and operates theme parks in China. The company also owns restaurants, hotels, and other businesses. It is one of the leading Chinese amusement park operators. The company was founded in 1989 by Su Zhigang, a local resident in Panyu, Guangzhou, Guangdong, who first established Xiangjiang Restaurant, his first enterprise under Chimelong Group, prior to its upgrading into the current Xiangjiang Hotel in 1994. Inspired by his success in the catering business, Su, after several field research visits to safari parks overseas, soon set up his mind to open a private zoo; his aim was to allow the Chinese citizens to see wildlife from all over the world, without going abroad. This gave birth to the establishment of Chimelong Safari Park, formerly known as Xiangjiang Safari Park in Guangzhou, China, the biggest wildlife theme park in Asia at present.

The headquarters is located on the grounds of Guangzhou Chimelong Tourist Resort in Panyu District, Guangzhou.

== Properties ==
=== Guangzhou ===
Guangzhou Chimelong Tourist Resort is located in Guangzhou, Guangdong, China.

- Attractions
  - Chimelong Paradise, home of the 10 Inversion Roller Coaster and Dive Coaster
  - Chimelong International Circus
  - Chimelong Water Park
  - Chimelong Safari Park, birthplace of the world's only surviving panda triplets
  - Chimelong Birds Park
- Hotels
  - Chimelong Hotel
  - Chimelong Panda Hotel
  - Panyu Xiangjiang Hotel

=== Zhuhai ===
Chimelong International Ocean Tourist Resort is located in Hengqin, Zhuhai, China and opened in 2014.

- Attractions
  - Chimelong Ocean Kingdom
  - Hengqin Theatre, Circus
  - Chimelong Theater
  - Chimelong Spaceship
- Hotels
  - Chimelong Hengqin Bay Hotel
  - Chimelong Penguin Hotel
  - Chimelong Circus Hotel
  - Chimelong Ying Hai Hotel and Apartments
  - Chimelong Spaceship Hotel

=== Qingyuan ===
Chimelong Qingyuan Forest Resort is located in Qingyuan, Guangdong, China and is opened in early 2025. The park features an 88-metre tall building named “Giraffe Castle” and the world's largest aviary, occupying an area of 5 hectares. The four-themed hotels will provide a total of 3,500 rooms.

- Attractions
  - Chimelong Forest Kingdom
- Hotels
  - Giraffe Hotel
  - Elephant Hotel
  - Zebra Hotel
  - Rhino Hotel
