= Chimelong Paradise =

Amusement park in Guangzhou, China

Chimelong Paradise 长隆欢乐世界

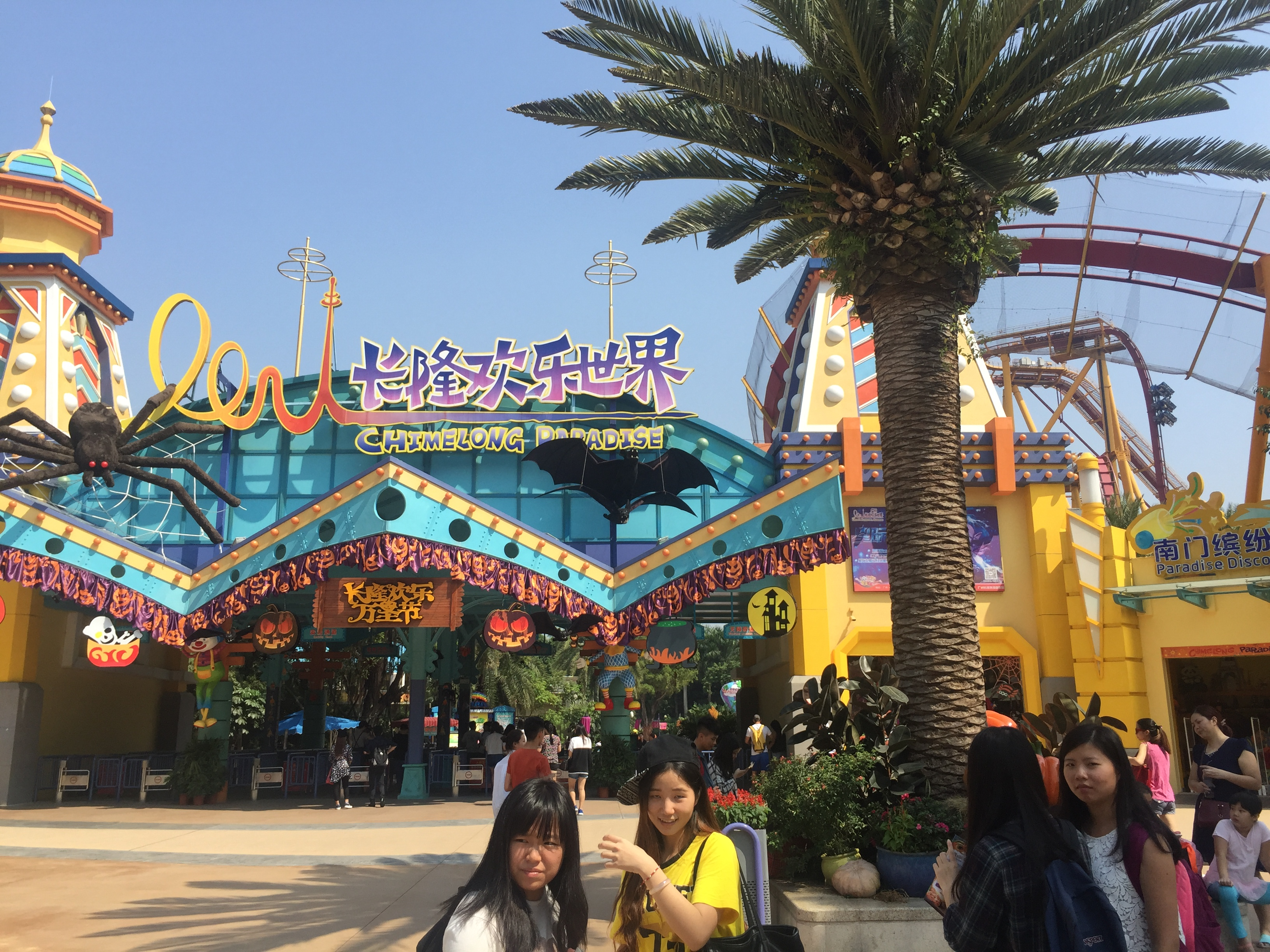
- The south entrance to Chimelong Paradise.
- Interactive map of Chimelong Paradise 长隆欢乐世界
- Location: Panyu, Guangzhou, Guangdong, China
- Coordinates: 23°00′16″N 113°19′37″E
- Status: Operating
- Opened: April 12, 2006
- Owner: Chimelong Group
- Operated by: Chimelong Group
- Operating season: Year round
- Area: 60 ha (150 acres)

Attractions
- Total: 49
- Roller coasters: 5
- Website: https://www.chimelong.com/gz/chimelongparadise/

Chimelong Paradise
- Simplified Chinese: 长隆欢乐世界
- Traditional Chinese: 長隆歡樂世界
Transcriptions
Standard Mandarin
- Hanyu Pinyin: Chánglóng Huānlè Shìjiè
Yue: Cantonese
- Jyutping: coeng4 lung4 fun1 lok6 sai3 gaai3

Chimelong Paradise (Chinese: 长隆欢乐世界) is a major amusement park in Panyu District, Guangzhou, Guangdong, China. Opened on April 12, 2006, Chimelong Paradise is the largest amusement park in China and boasts the 10 Inversion Roller Coaster, which prior to the opening of The Smiler at Alton Towers in Staffordshire, England, shared the record for most inversions with Colossus at Thorpe Park in Surrey, England. It is classified as a AAAAA scenic area by the China National Tourism Administration.

Chimelong Paradise is part of Guangzhou Chimelong Tourist Resort which is operated by the Chimelong Group, a Chinese tourism company that also operates numerous other attractions, including Chimelong Ocean Kingdom, the Chimelong Safari Park and Chimelong International Circus. Chimelong Group reported that construction of the park cost over 1 billion RMB. Stretching over 60 hectares, the park currently contains more than 60 attractions and has a daily capacity of 50,000 visitors. In 2008, a new roller coaster opened that is nearly 61 m (200 ft) tall and reaches a maximum speed of 105 kilometres per hour (65 mph). The park is linked by a bridge to Chimelong Water Park, and some admission tickets include access to both parks.

On July 29, 2014, rare giant panda cub triplets, all three of which have thus far survived, were born at the Chimelong Safari Park.

== Rides and attractions ==
=== Operating rides ===
Park Area	Name	Type	Height limit	Description	Image
Screaming Zone	10 Inversion Roller Coaster	Steel spinning coaster	Above 1m	A family-friendly roller coaster designed by Intamin.	
Water World	Shoot the Chute		Above 1m		
Happy Kingdom	Jumping Around	Sea Storm	Above 0.9m	Riders sit in a jumping chariot, as if running on a rugged battlefield. Designed by Mack Rides.	
Phantom Zone	Alien Attack	Shuttle roller coaster	Children in arms are excluded	Designed by Dynamic Structures.	
Phantom Zone	Forest Temple	Sky Rocket II	Above 1m	An adventure-themed Sky Rocket II roller coaster, and the only one in Asia, designed by Premier Rides.	
Phantom Zone	4D Theater	4D Theater	Children in arms are excluded	A theater showing a 4D film for families to enjoy together.	
Rainbow Bay	Dive Coaster	Dive Coaster	1.4-1.95m	A dive coaster that lets visitors imagine they are flying.	
Happy Kingdom	Junior Jet	Mini Jet Red Baron	0.9-1.4m	A spinning children's ride with airplane-themed cabs, where young children can pretend to be an airplane pilot.	
Kids' Land	Mini Tug	Flat tugboat	Above 1.05m	A Rockin' Tug ride designed by Zamperla.	
Rainbow Bay	Giant Frisbee	Disk'O Coaster	1.4-1.95m	A flat ride with a circular ride platform.	
Happy Kingdom	Crazy Bus	Crazy bus ride	Above 0.9m	A Junior Flying Carpet stimulating riding on a bus.	
Happy Kingdom	Jumping Tower	Drop tower	Above 0.9m	A drop tower ride with a futuristic theme.	
Happy Kingdom	Sun & Moon Wheels	Ferris wheel	Above 0.9m	A ferris wheel allowing good views of the theme park.	
Happy Kingdom	Sky Drop	Drop tower	1.2-1.95m	A classic drop tower ride, which is very popular with both children and adults.	
Happy Kingdom	Barnyard	Wave swinger	Above 0.9m	A barnyard-themed wave swinger ride.	
Happy Kingdom	Jumping Tower	Drop Tower	1.4-1.9m	Another drop tower allowing visitors the feeling of sudden weightlessness.	
Screaming zone	Motorbike Coaster	Suspended floorless coaster	Above 1m	A ride that allows visitors to experience the feeling of walking on air.	
Kids' Land	12 Horse Carousel	Carousel	Above 1.2m	A traditional-style carousel.	
Whirlwind Island	Bumper car	Bumper cars	Above 1.2m	A bumper cars ride.	
Happy Kingdom	Convoy	Convoy ride	Above 0.9m	A ride imitating a safari jeep ride through a jungle.	

=== Themed areas ===
Chimelong Paradise is split into seven different themed areas with the following attractions.

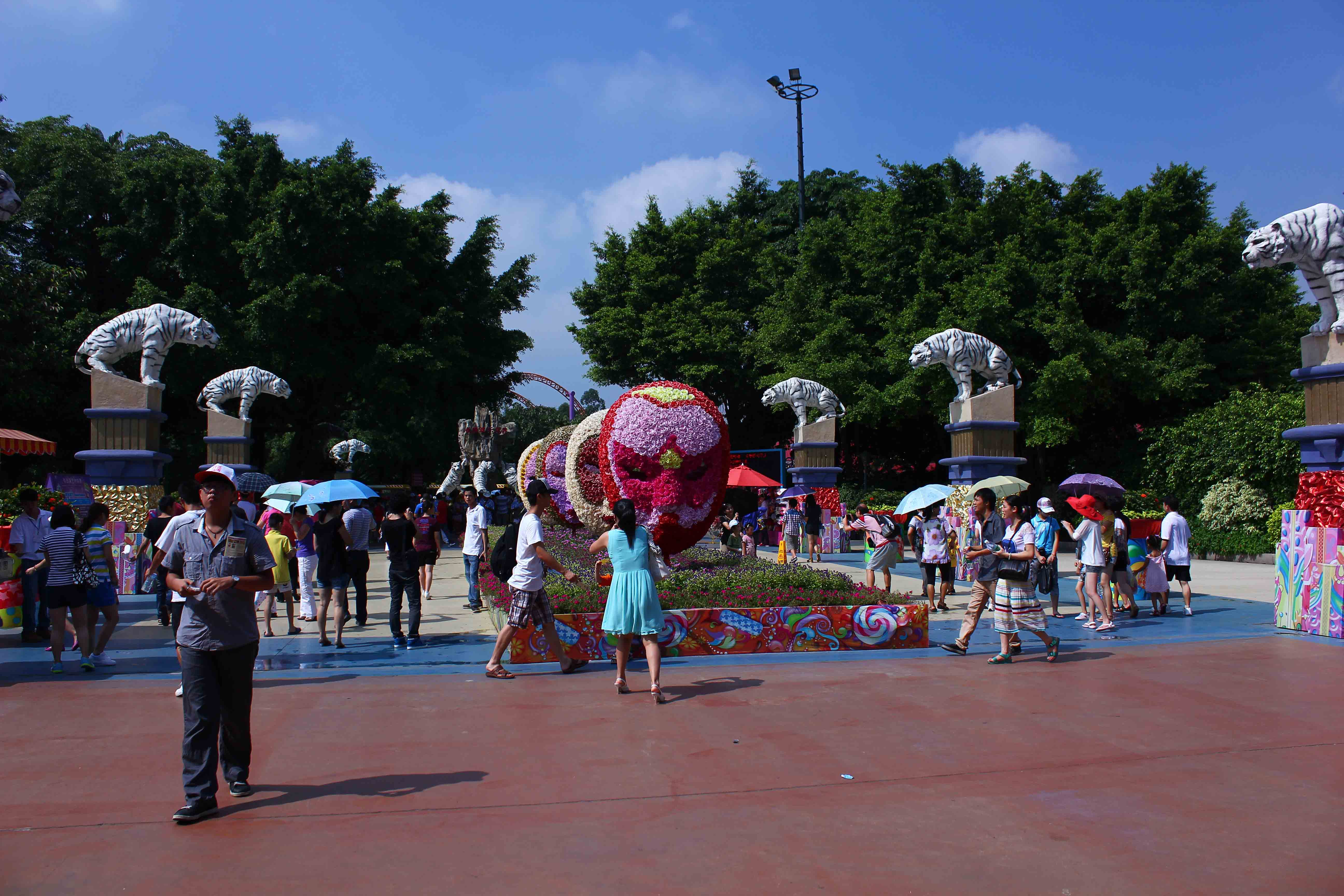
White Tiger Street

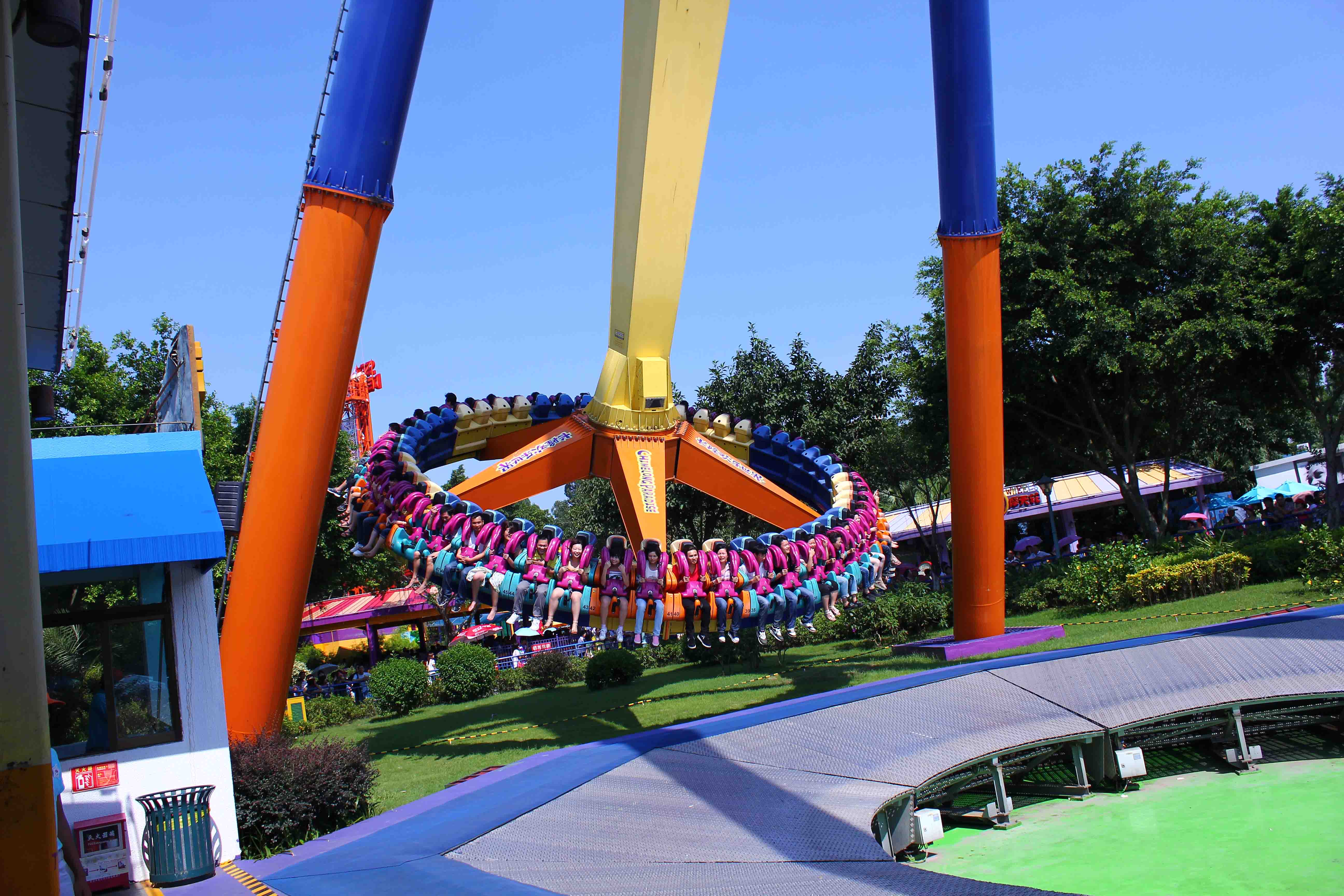
Giant Frisbee in Rainbow Bay

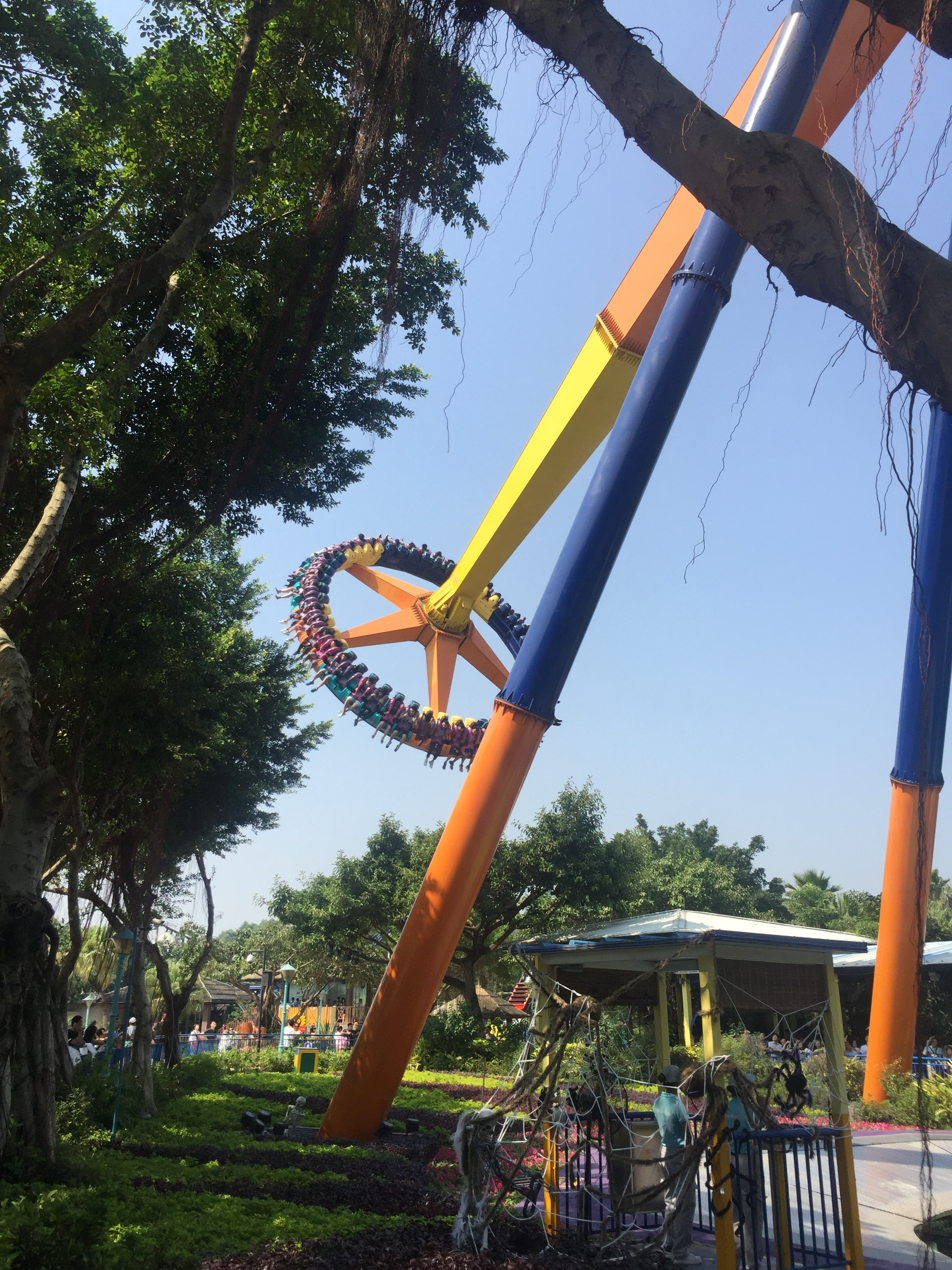
Giant Frisbee in Rainbow Bay

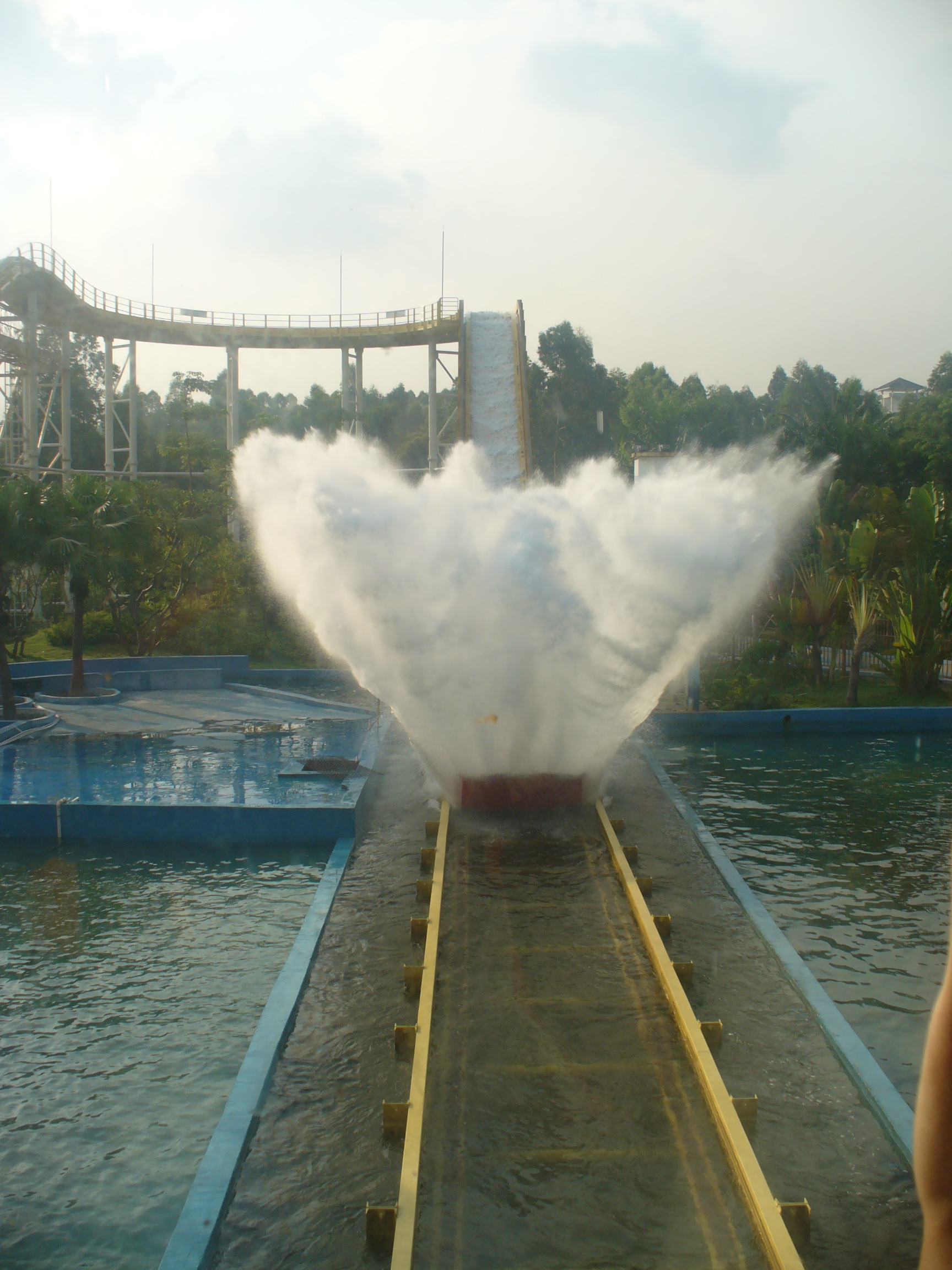
Shoot the Chute in Water World

==== Whirlwind Island ====
- Half Pipe
- Rotating Cup
- Swiftly Chair
- Sombrero
- Bumper Car
- Music Flier

==== Screaming Zone ====
- 10 Inversion Roller Coaster
- Windshear
- Motorbike Coaster
- Jumping Machine
- Sky Rocket Roller Coaster

==== Happy Kingdom ====
- Convoy
- Flying Tiger
- Helicopter Tower
- Double-deck Carousel
- Jumping Around
- Junior Jet
- Samba Balloon
- Fire Truck
- North Pole
- Sky Bicycle
- Skater
- Crazy Bus
- Sky Drop
- Sun & Moon Wheel
- Jumping Tower

==== Kids' Land ====
- Ball Shooting
- Bravery Fire Fighting
- Rotating Honeybee
- Flying Saucer
- Turtle Paradise
- Noah's Ark
- Canoe River
- Mini Tug
- Kids Climbing Vehicle
- Small Swing
- Circus Train
- 12 Horse Carousel

==== Rainbow Bay ====
- Dive Coaster
- Giant Frisbee
- Young Star Coaster

==== Water World ====
- Splash Battle
- Bumper Boat
- Shoot the Chute
- Pirate Raft

==== Phantom Zone ====
- Rio (4D movie)
- Forest Temple
- Rain Forest
- Alien Attack

== Transportation ==
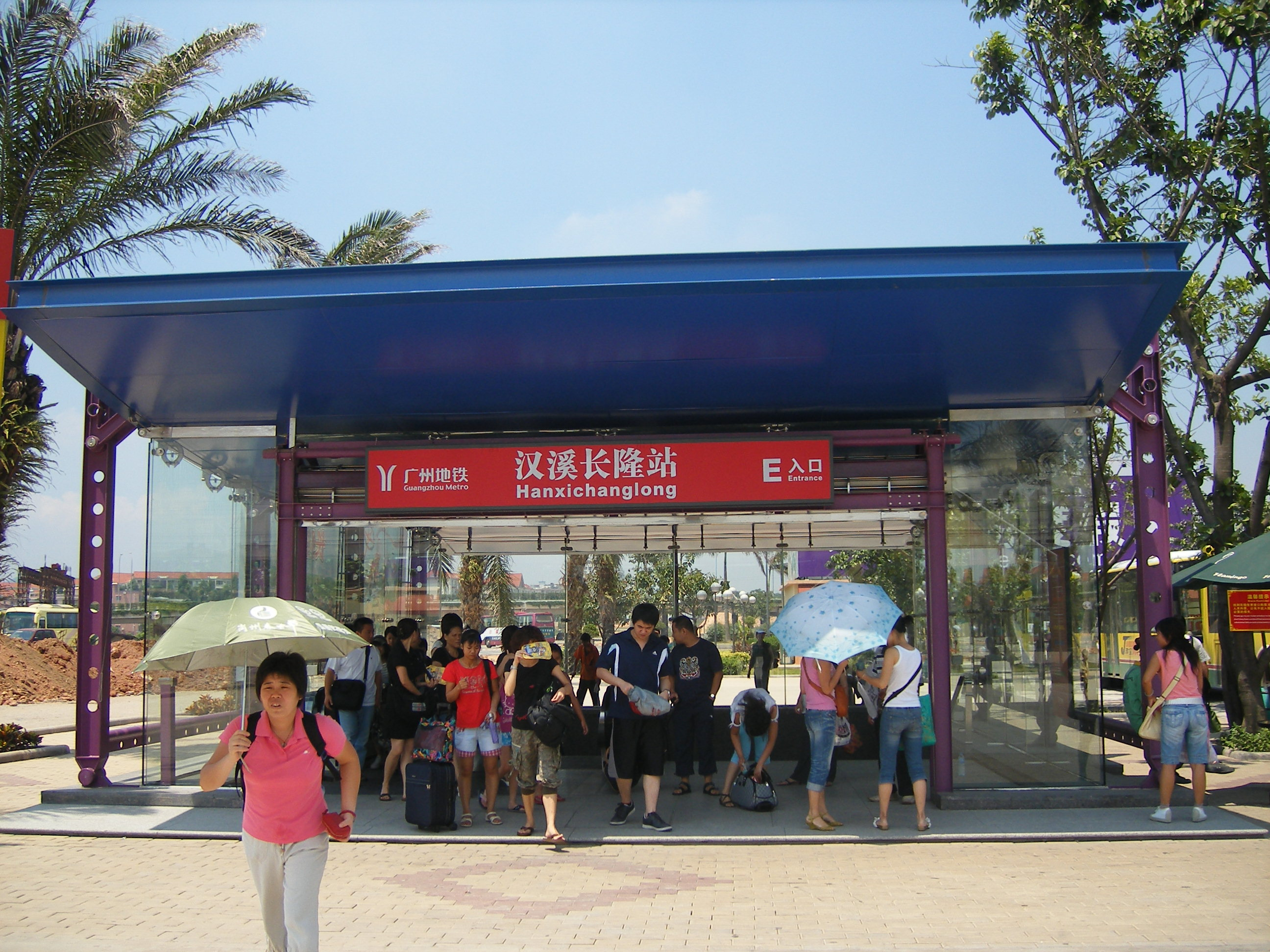
Exit E of Hanxi Changlong station

Guangzhou Metro:

- Exit E of Hanxi Changlong Station on Line 3 and Line 7 are linked by a footbridge (3 minute walk) or free shuttle bus

Buses:

- Metro Line 9 feeder bus Hanxi Changlong Station - Panyu Village
- 129 Jincheng Garden (Dongfeng East)
- 302 Guangzhou East Railway Station
- 303 Tianhe Bus Station
- 304 Tangxia
- 310 University City
- 657 Dongpu Terminal

== See also ==
- Chimelong Ocean Kingdom
- List of tourist attractions in China
