= Chimelong Ocean Kingdom =

Theme park in Hengqin, Zhuhai, China

Zhuhai Chimelong Ocean Kingdom 珠海长隆海洋王国

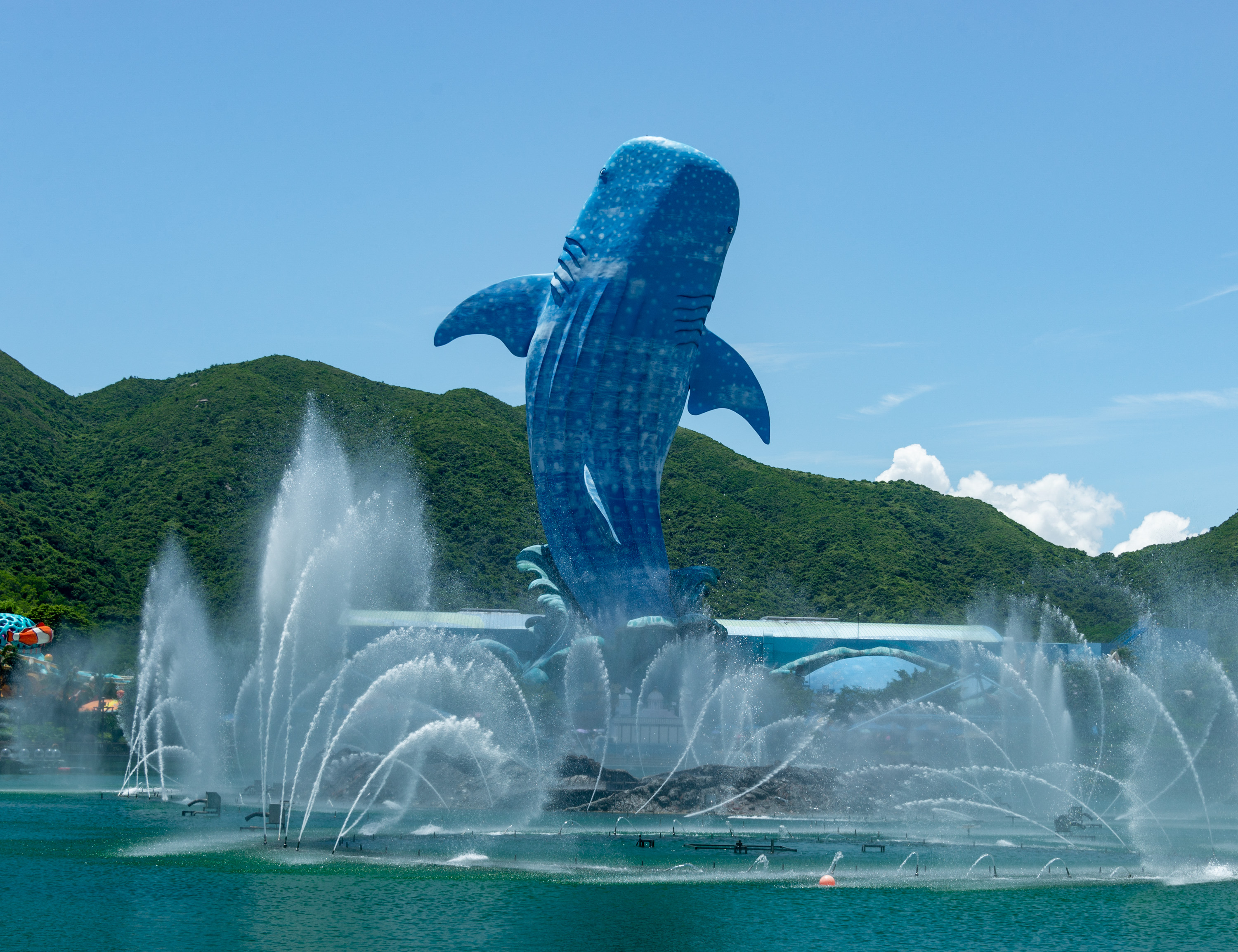
- Interactive map of Zhuhai Chimelong Ocean Kingdom 珠海长隆海洋王国
- Location: Chimelong International Ocean Resort, Fuxiang Bay, Hengqin, Zhuhai, China
- Coordinates: 22.1001°N 113.5300°E
- Opened: 29 March 2014; 12 years ago
- Owner: Chimelong Group
- Operated by: Chimelong Group
- General manager: Paul Yuen
- Theme: Marine
- Slogan: 全球领先的海洋主题乐园; World Leading Ocean Theme Park
- Operating season: Year round
- Attendance: 12.63 million (2024)
- Area: 8

Attractions
- Total: 15
- Roller coasters: 3
- Water rides: 2
- Website: www.chimelong.com/zh/oceankingdom/

Chimelong Ocean Kingdom
- Simplified Chinese: 珠海长隆海洋王国
- Traditional Chinese: 珠海長隆海洋王國
Transcriptions
Standard Mandarin
- Hanyu Pinyin: Zhūhǎi Chánglóng Hǎiyáng Wángguó
Yue: Cantonese
- Jyutping: zyu1 hoi2 coeng4 lung4 hoi2 joeng4 wong4 gwok3

Chimelong Ocean Kingdom is a theme park situated in Hengqin, Zhuhai, China. It was designed by PGAV Destinations. The park broke ground on 28 November 2010 and soft-opened on 28 January 2014. The grand opening occurred on 29 March of that year. The first phase of the park cost RMB 10 billion to build. It is part of the Chimelong International Ocean Tourist Resort, which aims to become the "Orlando of China". In 2024, the park hosted 12.6 million visitors, making it the sixth-most visited theme park in the world and the most visited theme park in the world that is not a Disney or Universal park.

Among its attractions are a wide range of amusement rides and animal shows, as well as one of the world's largest oceanariums with a total of 48.75 million litres (12,880,000 US gal; 10,720,000 imp gal) of water. The theme park has achieved five Guinness World Records.

== Themed areas ==
There are eight themed areas inside the park, each representing a part of the ocean.

=== Ocean Avenue ===
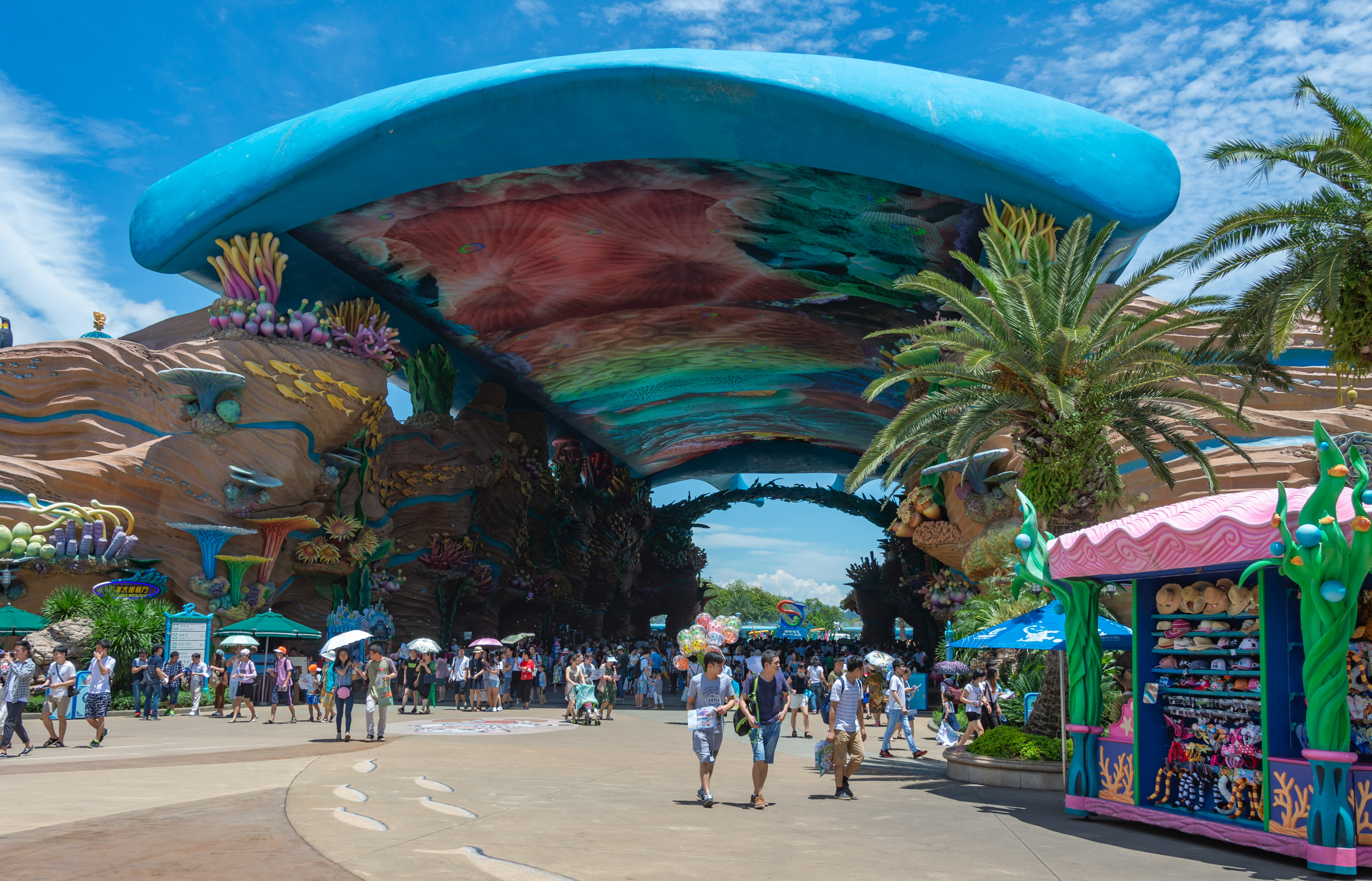
Ocean Avenue

- The entrance area with shops and an LED digital canopy that showcases the sea

=== Dolphin Cove ===
==== Amusement rides ====
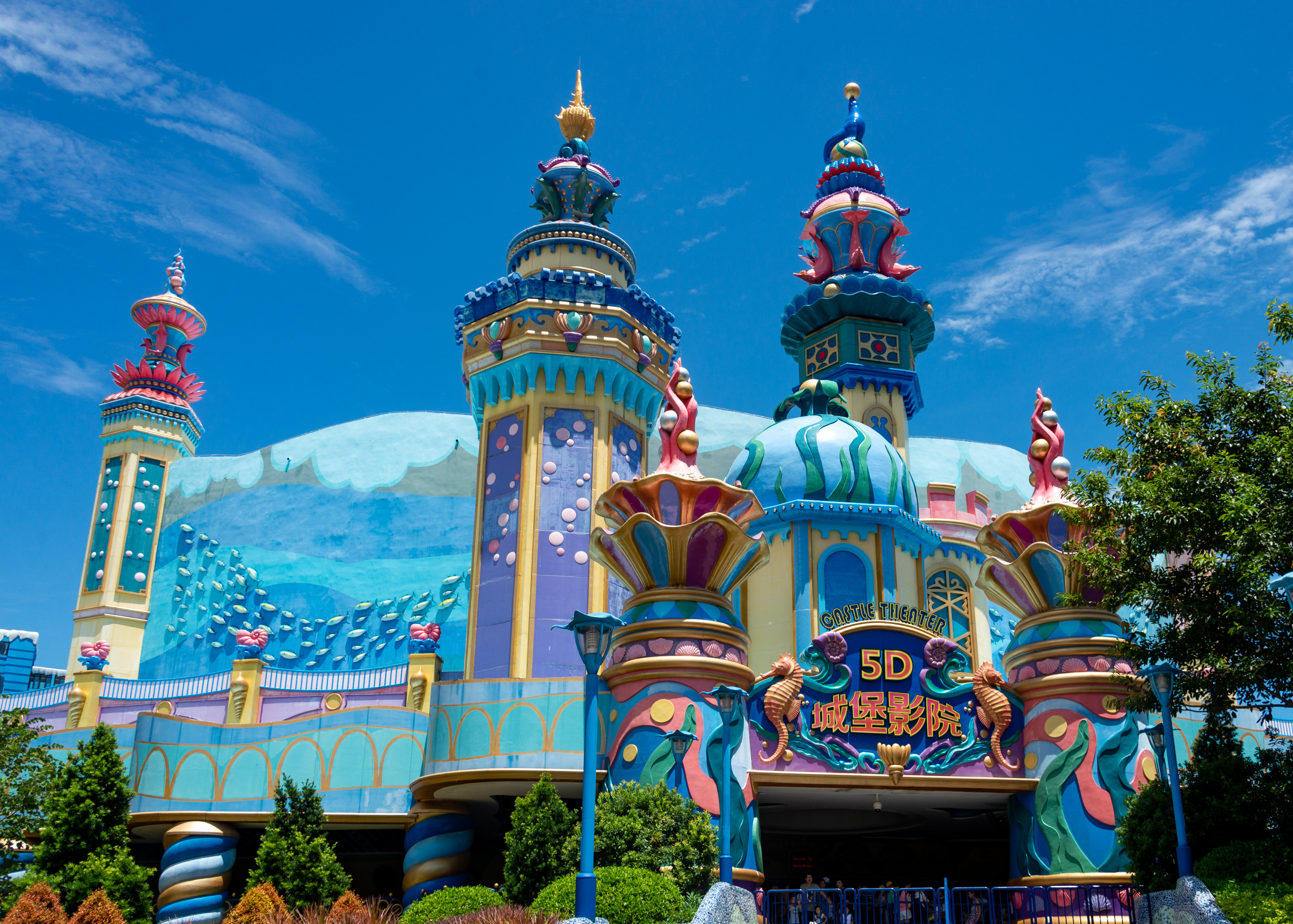
Castle Theatre

- Battle of the Pirates – spinning tea cups with shooting water jets
- Dolphin Round Ride – spinner ride
- 5D Castle Theatre – Opened in 2015. The castle theatre features a 13-minute animated film called "Kaka's Great Adventure". The film is produced by Prana Studios with Kraftwerk Living Technologies (KLT) providing the hardware. The theatre has a 1,500-square-metre (16,000 sq ft) curved screen, a world record. The theatre took more than three years to plan and cost some ¥300 million (US$50 million) to build.

==== Animal exhibits ====
- Dolphin Island and Dolphin Theatre – spotted dolphin habitat
- Dolphin Conservation Center – Chinese white dolphin habitat with viewing for guests both above and underwater

=== Amazing Amazon ===
==== Amusement rides ====
- Parrot Coaster – Bolliger & Mabillard winged coaster ride

==== Animal exhibits ====
- Journey to the Amazon – freshwater aquarium

=== Ocean Beauty ===
==== Amusement rides ====
- Deep Sea Odyssey – submarine ride that goes inside the aquarium

==== Animal exhibits ====
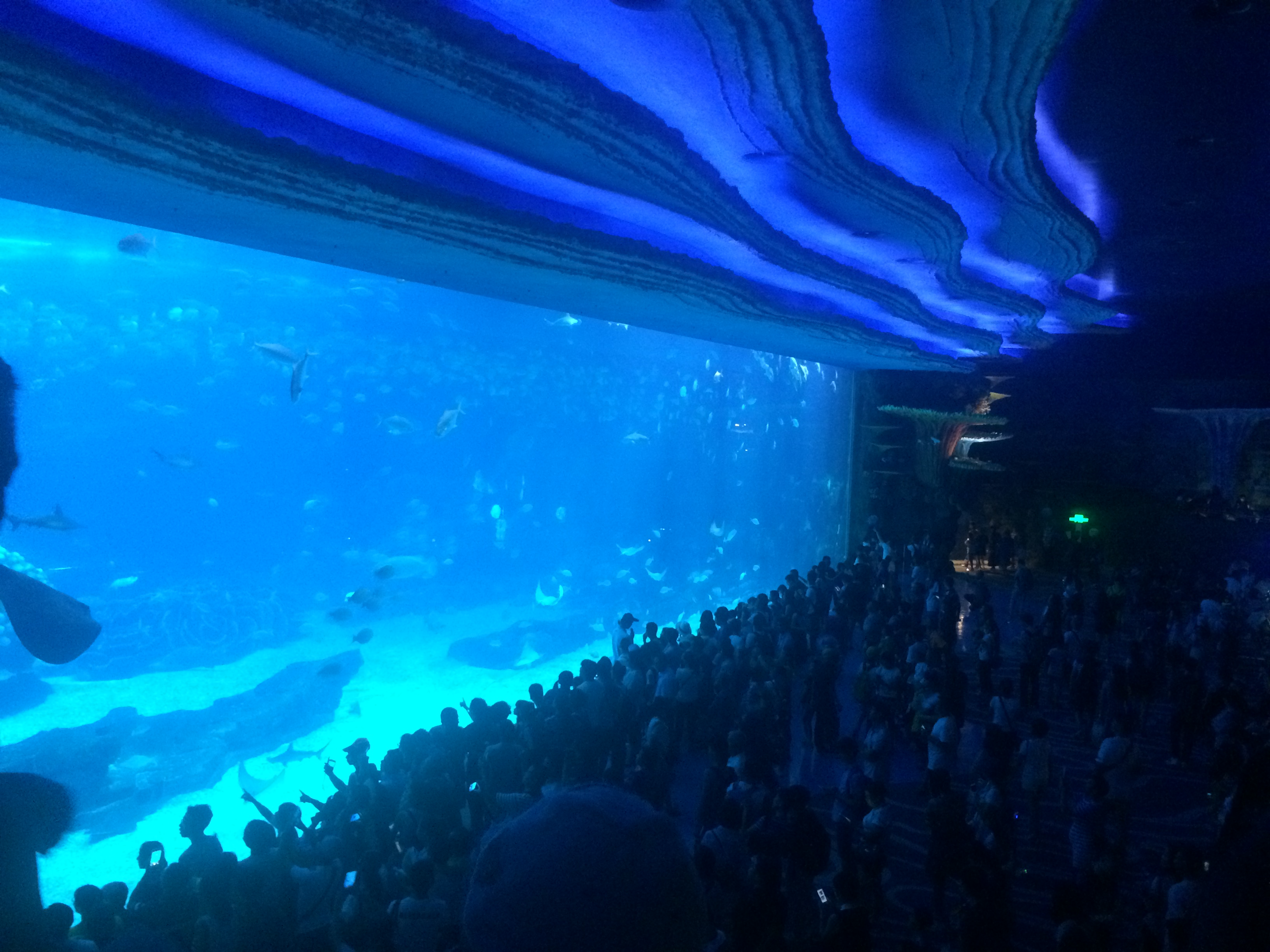
Whale Shark Aquarium

- Whale Shark Exhibit Aquarium – the tank itself contains 22.7 million litres (6,000,000 US gal; 5,000,000 imp gal) of water, making it the largest in the world, and it is home to whale sharks, manta rays, and many other species at the time of its opening.

=== Polar Horizon ===
==== Amusement rides ====
- Polar Explorer – water roller coaster ride

==== Animal exhibits ====
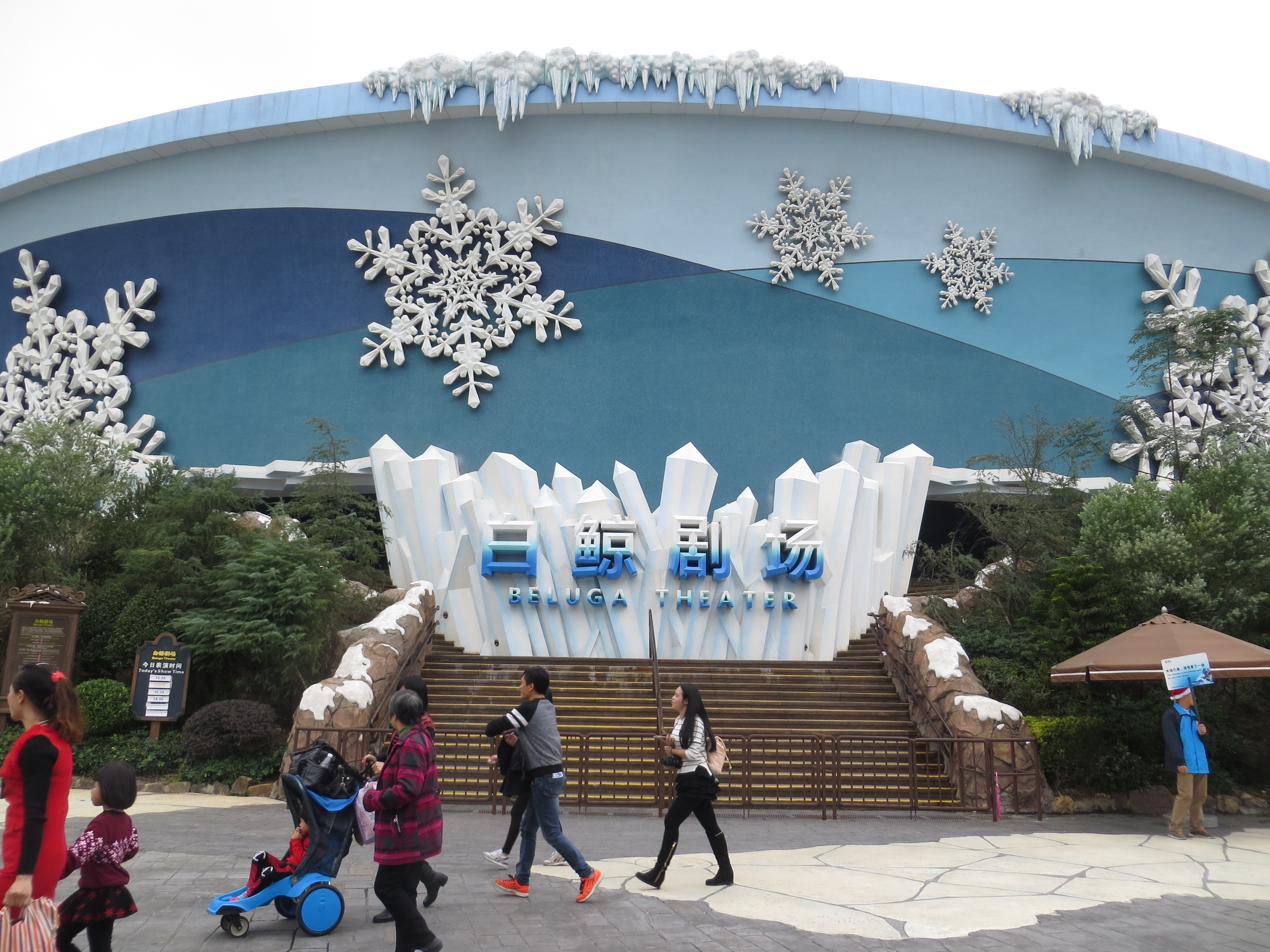
Beluga Theatre

- Beluga Experience and Beluga Theatre – beluga habitat
- Polar bear Village – Polar bear habitat
- Penguin World – Penguin habitat

=== Hero Island ===
==== Amusement rides ====
- Bumper Smash – Bumper cars
- Games Arcade – game stalls
- Penguin Coaster
- Jungle Coaster
- Tower of Sea Monsters

==== Animal exhibits ====
- Otter's Den – Asian small-clawed otter habitat
- Stingray Encounter – Stingray touch pool
- Tide Pools – Touch tanks with small fish and other sea creatures

=== Mount Walrus ===
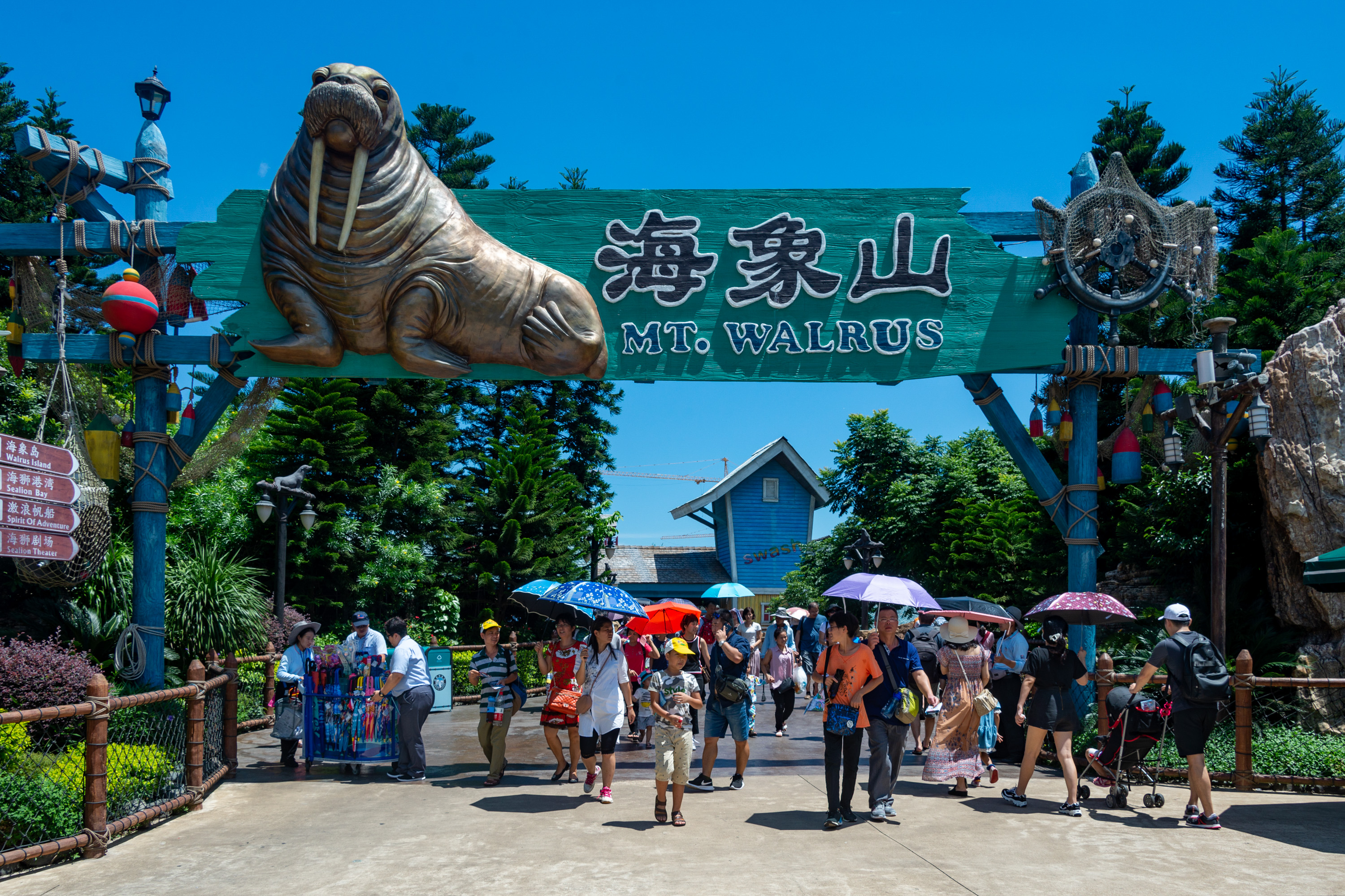
Mount Walrus entrance

==== Amusement rides ====
- Spirit of Adventure – pirate ship
- Walrus Splash – giant flume

==== Animal exhibits ====
- Walrus Island – walrus habitat
- Sea Lion Bay and Sea Lion Theatre – sea lion habitat
- Sea Bird Paradise – Home to pelicans, white cranes, white-naped cranes, white storks, herons, spotted seals, capybaras, green sea turtles, African spurred tortoises, Aldabra giant tortoise and seagulls.

=== Hengqin Ocean ===
- Shows, parades, and firework shows

=== Entertainments ===
Journey of Lights – Nighttime parade designed by Miziker Entertainment

== Rides and shows ==
=== Rides ===
Name	Type	Manufacturer	Area	Opened	Image
Parrot Coaster	Wing Coaster	Bolliger & Mabillard	Amazing Amazon	2014	
Polar Explorer	Water Coaster	Mack Rides	Polar Horizon	2014	
Walrus Splash	SuperSplash	Mack Rides	Walrus Mountain	2014	
Penguin Coaster	Force Coaster	Zierer	Hero Island	2018	
Jungle Coaster	Force Coaster	Zierer	Hero Island	2018	

=== Shows ===
Name	Type	Venue	Area	Opened
Dolphin Show	Animal show	Dolphin Theater	Dolphin Cove	2014
Sea Lion Show	Animal show	Sea Lion Theater	Mount Walrus	2014
Beluga Show	Animal show	Beluga Theater	Polar Horizon	2014
Ocean Resistance	Nighttime Spectacular	Hengqin Ocean	Hengqin Ocean	2017
Musical Fountain Spectacular	Fountain show	Hengqin Ocean	Hengqin Ocean	2015

== Transportation ==
The resort has been served by the Zhuhai Changlong railway station on the Zhuhai–Zhuhai Airport intercity railway since 18 August.

== Awards and records ==
In 2015, Chimelong Ocean Kingdom won the Thea Award for Outstanding Achievement over 169 international candidates, marking the first time the award was given to a Chinese theme park.

The ocean park holds the Guinness world record for being the largest aquarium in the world, it also had the largest aquarium window in the world according to the Guinness World Records, a single acrylic panel measuring 39.6 by 8.3 metres (130 by 27 ft).

The Journey of Lights parade won the 2018 Thea Award for outstanding achievement – live show.

== Criticism ==
Samuel Hung Ka-yiu, chairman of the Hong Kong Dolphin Conservation Society, said, "Ocean Kingdom seems to have imported everything." They are doing everything wrong. "They are doing everything you don't want them to do". Examples include polar bears confined in small areas demonstrating "repetitive pacing, swaying, head-bobbing or circling" and skin disorders in penguins kept in a sub-tropical environment.

Further criticism arises from a recent trade of orcas between China and Russia. In 2013 Russia captured wild orcas in the Sea of Okhotsk, two of which have been sold to China. "Now, a conservation group monitoring the capture of killer whales says it has discovered that Convention on International Trade in Endangered Species of Wild Fauna and Flora (CITES) permits were applied for by Russia and granted for two wild-caught killer whales, also known as orcas, to be exported to China." Ocean Kingdom refuses to comment on whether they plan to display orcas in the future, but there are currently 50 aquariums in China, none of which have orcas on display.

== Attendance ==
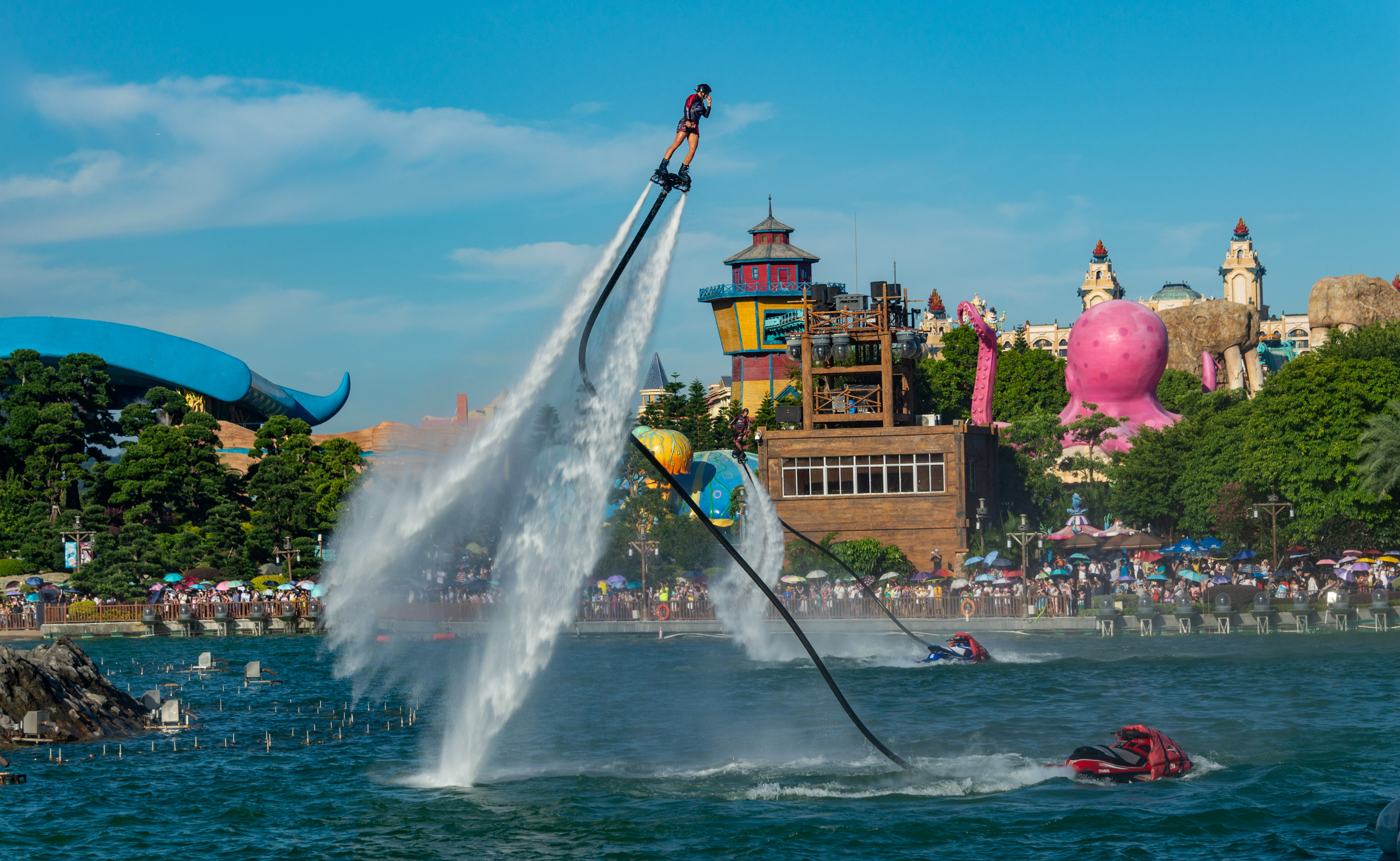
A waterjet show attracts a large audience.

Year	Attendance	Worldwide Rank	Ref.
2014	5,504,000	20	
2015	7,486,000	13	
2016	8,474,000	12	
2017	9,788,000	11	
2018	10,830,000	10	
2019	11,736,000	8	
2020	4,797,000	—N/a	
2021	7,452,000	—N/a	
2022	4,400,000	—N/a	
2023	12,520,000	6	
2024	12,628,000	6	

== See also ==
- Chimelong Paradise
- List of tourist attractions in China
