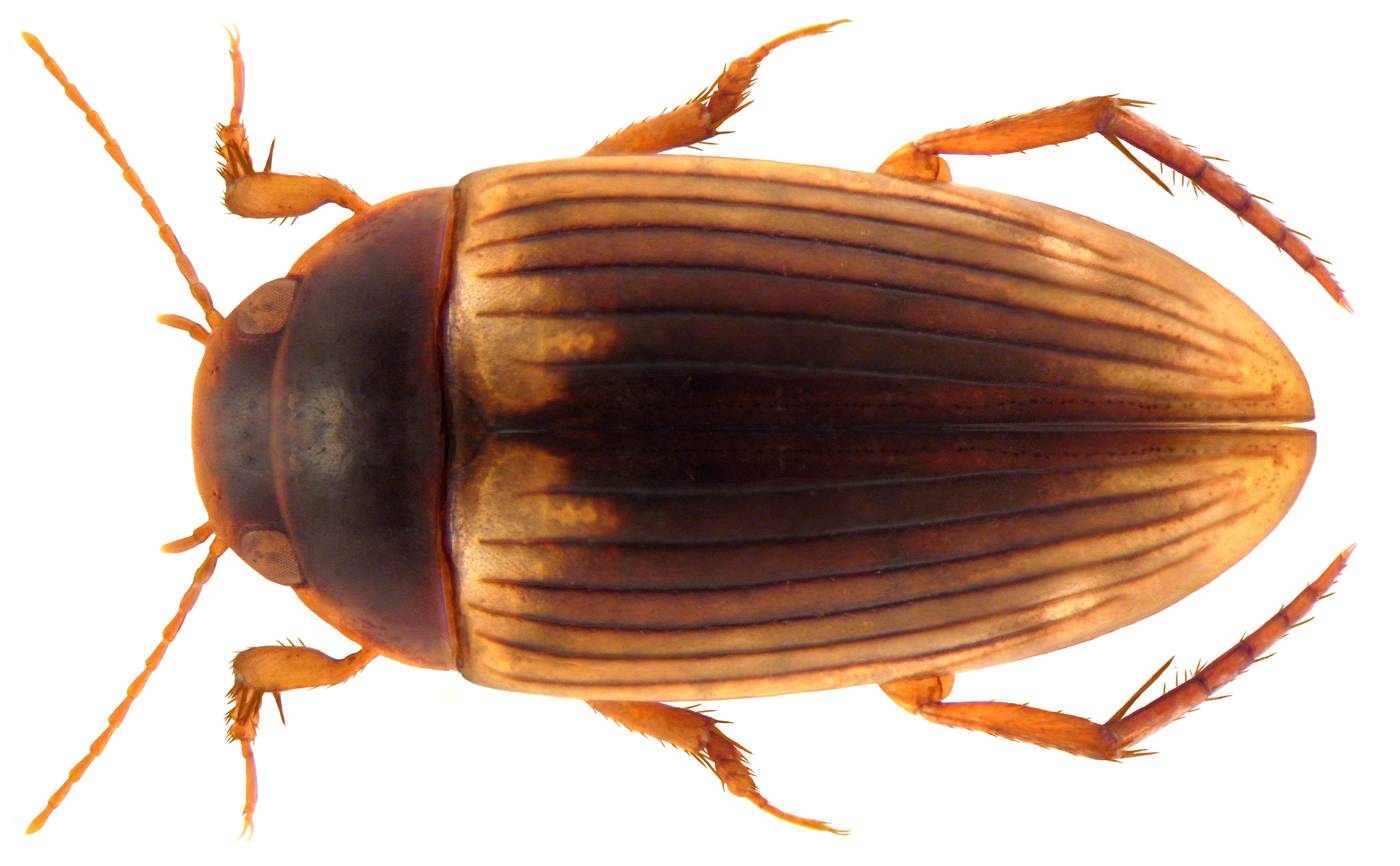

Scientific classification
- Domain: Eukaryota
- Kingdom: Animalia
- Phylum: Arthropoda
- Class: Insecta
- Order: Coleoptera
- Suborder: Adephaga
- Family: Dytiscidae
- Genus: Copelatus
- Species: C. sociennus

Binomial name
- Copelatus sociennus J. Balfour-Browne, 1952

Synonyms
- Copelatus bangalorensis Vazirani, 1970

= Copelatus sociennus =

Species of beetle

Copelatus sociennus is a species of diving beetle. It is part of the subfamily Copelatinae in the family Dytiscidae. It was described by J. Balfour-Browne in 1952. The species can be found on Coloane and in Seac Pai Van. It feeds on Nelumbo nucifera.
