= Disability in Macau =

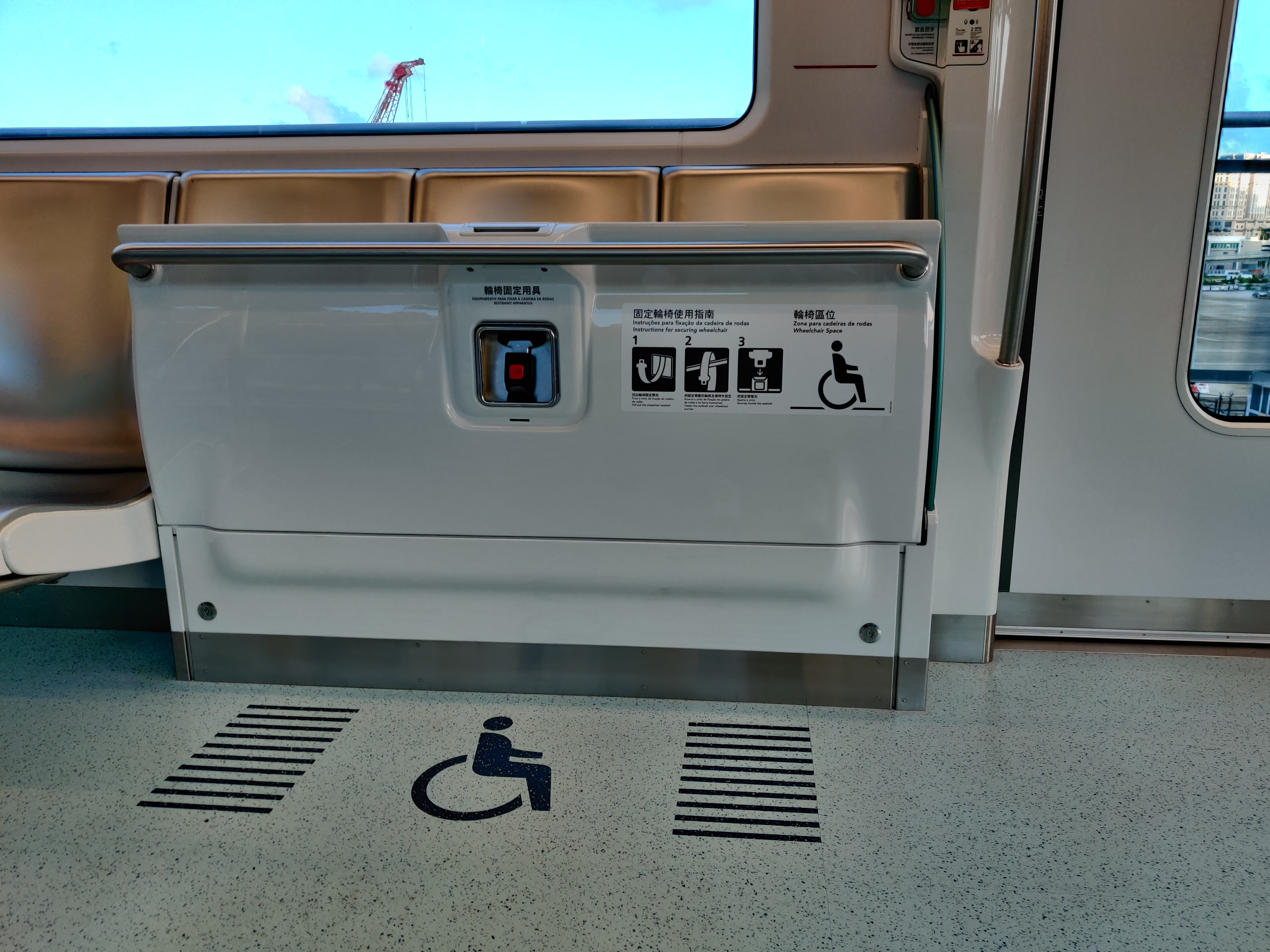
Wheelchair space in Macau LRT

Disability in Macau refers to the related affairs of people with disability in Macau, China.

== Law ==
China, including Macau, signed the Convention on the Rights of Persons with Disabilities. The Law of Macau prohibits the discrimination against people with disabilities in education, employment, healthcare access or access to other public services.

== Budget ==
The coordination and funding of public assistance programs for disabled people is under the responsibility of Social Welfare Bureau.

=== Benefits ===
On 11 October 2017, the government increased the amount of two disability subsidies for permanent residents with 6.67% increase for regular disability subsidy and 7.14% increase for special disability subsidy.

== Public facilities ==
=== Transportation ===
Macau International Airport and ferry terminals are disabled accessible with the help from the staffs. The Social Welfare Bureau also offers free rides to medical facilities by the Rehabilitation Bus services. Transports and tourism services for disabled people are also available by the Macau Barrier Free Tourism. Pedestrians are generally equipped with audible signals and raised-treading. Special lot for disabled people is required at public parking lots.

== See also ==
- Healthcare in Macau
