= Lohas Park (Macau) =

Residential development in Macau, China

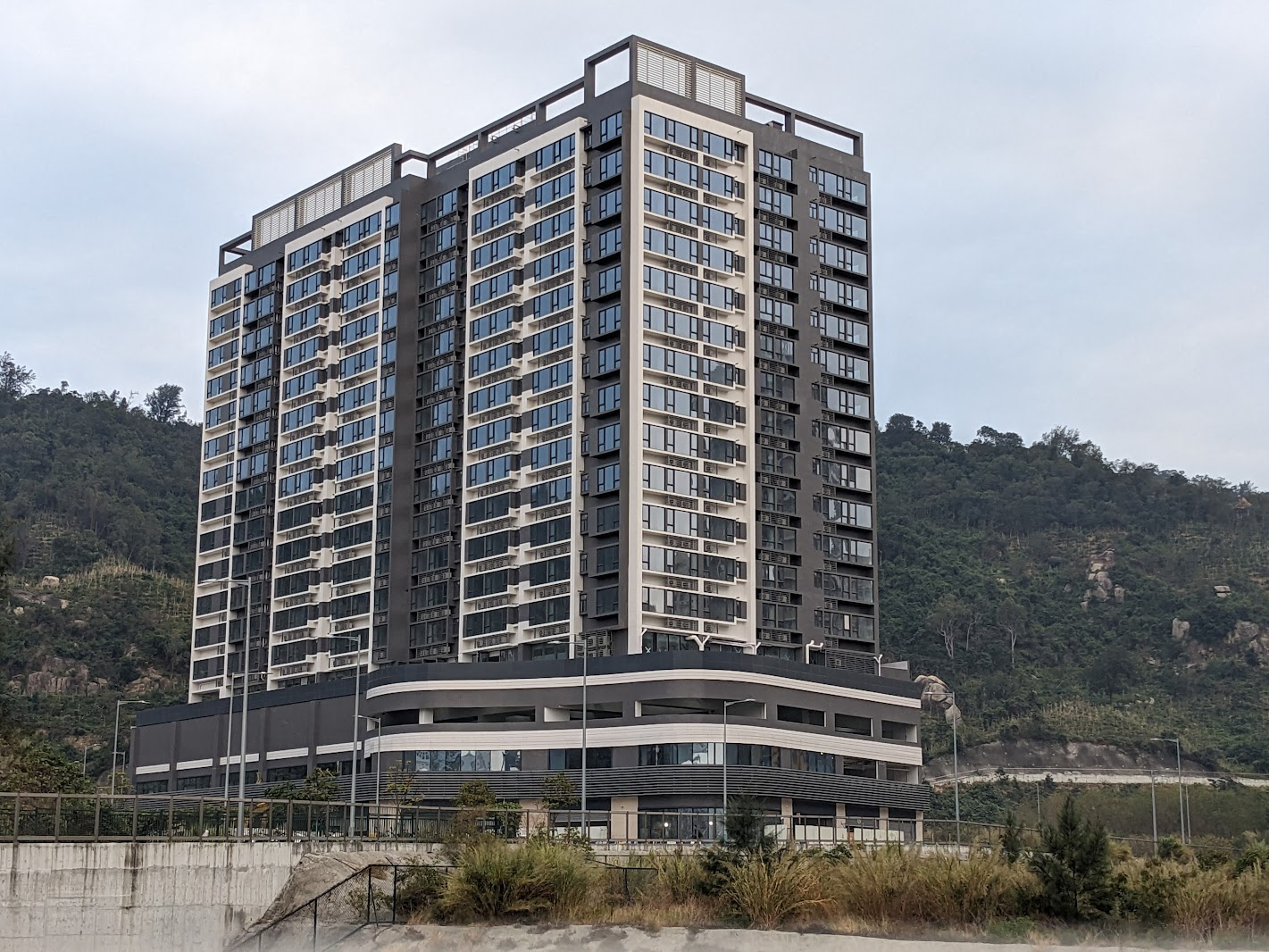
- Lohas Park
- Status: Completed
- Type: Residential Complex
- Address: 33 Rua do Jasmim
- Website: https://lohasparkmacao.com

Lohas Park (珀悅) is a private residential development in Macao, located at 33 Rua do Jasmim, Seac Pai Van, Coloane.

Lohas Park

Chinese name
- Chinese: 珀悅
Transcriptions
Standard Mandarin
- Hanyu Pinyin: Pò Yuè
Yue: Cantonese
- Jyutping: paak3 jyut6

Portuguese name
- Portuguese: Lohas Park

Location of Lohas Park

== Floor plan ==
According to the floor plan data provided by the Land and Urban Construction Bureau, the project covers an area of 2,260 square meters and offers 217 residential units, 197 parking spaces, and 10 commercial units.

It was the first residential complex in Macau to receive a rating in the National Green Building Rating System.

== Commercial history ==
The presale started in 2023. In 2023, it accounted for the highest number of transactions in Macau's real estate market. The average price of 7,000 HKD was considered attractive, with 69 units sold that year.

At the beginning of 2025, it recorded 80 transactions in January.

== Clubhouse ==
Lohas Park provides Android and iOS applications for bookings of its clubhouse.

== Transportation ==
Lohas Park is served by the LRT Seac Pai Van station.
