= Macau University of Science and Technology Hospital =

Hospital in Cotai, Macau, China

Coordinates: 22.1546°N 113.5686°E

Macau University of Science and Technology Hospital 科大醫院 Hospital Universitário da Universidade de Ciência e Tecnologia de Macau
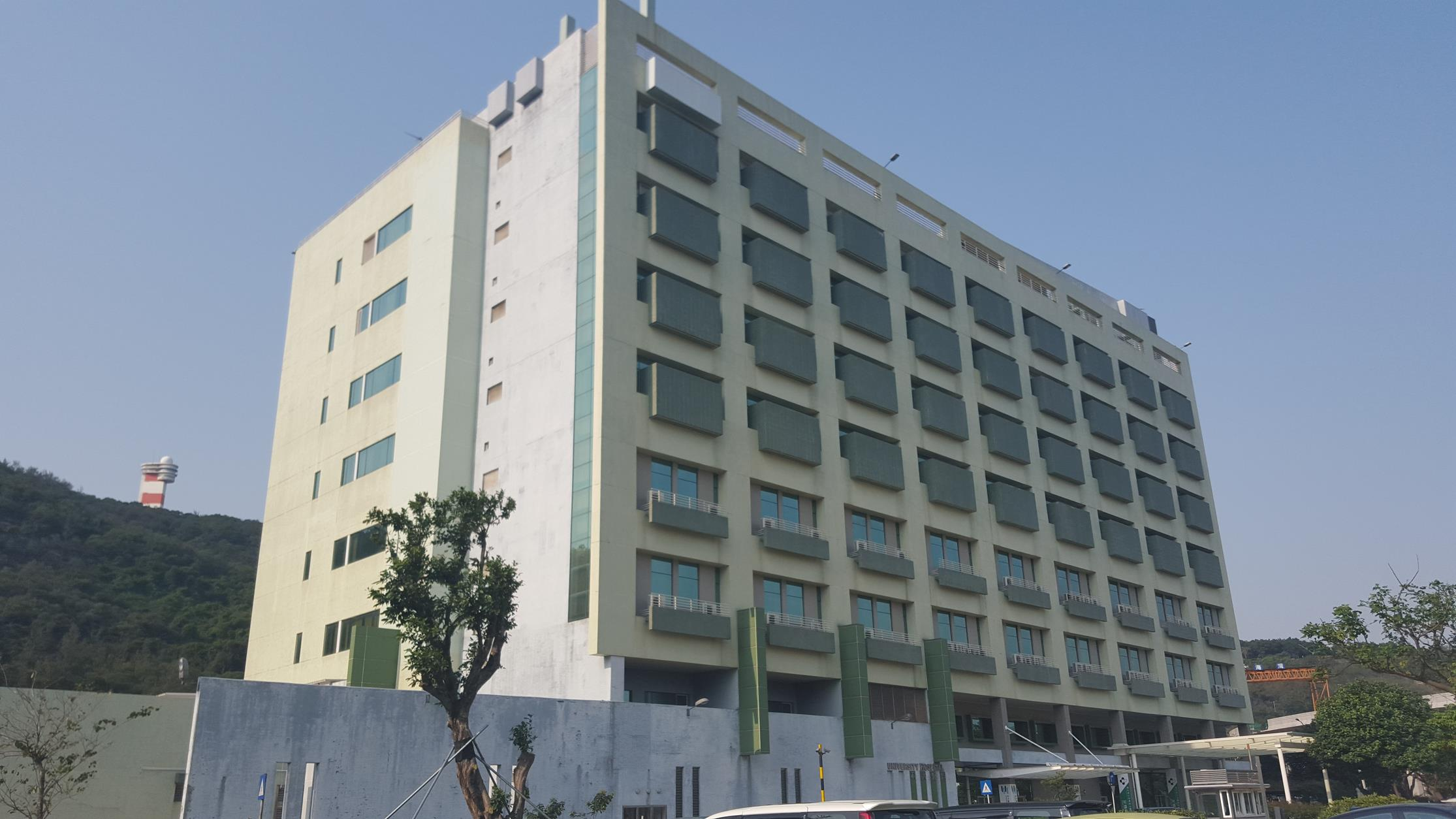

Geography
- Location: Cotai, Macau

Organisation
- Care system: medicare
- Funding: Non-profit hospital
- Type: District General
- Affiliated university: Macau University of Science and Technology Foundation

Services
- Emergency department: No (Accident and Emergency Services at Kiang Wu Hospital)
- Beds: 60

History
- Opened: 2006

Links
- Website: www.uh.org.mo

Macau University of Science and Technology Hospital

Chinese name
- Traditional Chinese: 科大醫院
- Simplified Chinese: 科大医院
Transcriptions
Standard Mandarin
- Hanyu Pinyin: Kēdà Yīyuàn
Yue: Cantonese
- Jyutping: fo1 daai6 ji1 jyun6*2

Portuguese name
- Portuguese: Hospital Universitário da Universidade de Ciência e Tecnologia de Macau

Macau University of Science and Technology Hospital (MUST Hospital; Chinese: 科大醫院, Portuguese: Hospital Universitário da Universidade de Ciência e Tecnologia de Macau) is a teaching hospital and one of three hospitals in Macau. The hospital is located in the Cotai area of Macau. Opened in 2006, it is run by the Macau University of Science and Technology Foundation.

The hospital focuses on both Chinese and Western medicine, and is associated with the foundation. The hospital is also a teaching hospital for the first medical school that was established in Macau in 2019 at the Macau University of Science and Technology.

Currently the hospital is not engaged in international healthcare accreditation.

== Departments and services ==
- Chinese Medicine Department
- Western Medicine Department
- Sleep Disorder Management Centre
- Executive Health Management Centre
- International Medical Service
- Specialist Center of Chinese Medicine Faculty
- Clinical Laboratory Diagnostic Centre
- Endoscopy Centre
- Medical Imaging Diagnostic Centre
- Integrated Rehabilitation Service Centre
- Integrated Chinese and Western Medicine Oncology Treatment Service
- “Zhi Wei Bing” (Preventive Medicine)

== Transport ==
=== Bus ===
The hospital is served by two bus stops: "Wai Long / M.U.S.T-Hospital" and "Rotunda do Aeroporto / Wai Long".

Wai Long / M.U.S.T-Hospital:

- 26
- 36
- 51A
- AP1
- MT1
- N2
- N5
- N6

Rotunda do Aeroporto / Wai Long:

- 26
- 51A
- MT1
- N2
- N5

=== Cars ===
There is a car park in front of the hospital.

=== Shuttle ===
The hospital offers a shuttle to Nam Van (in front of Luso International Banking) from 9:30 to 20:30.

== See also ==
- Healthcare in Macau
- List of hospitals in Macau
- List of hospitals in China
