= Seac Pai Van line =

Seac Pai Van Line

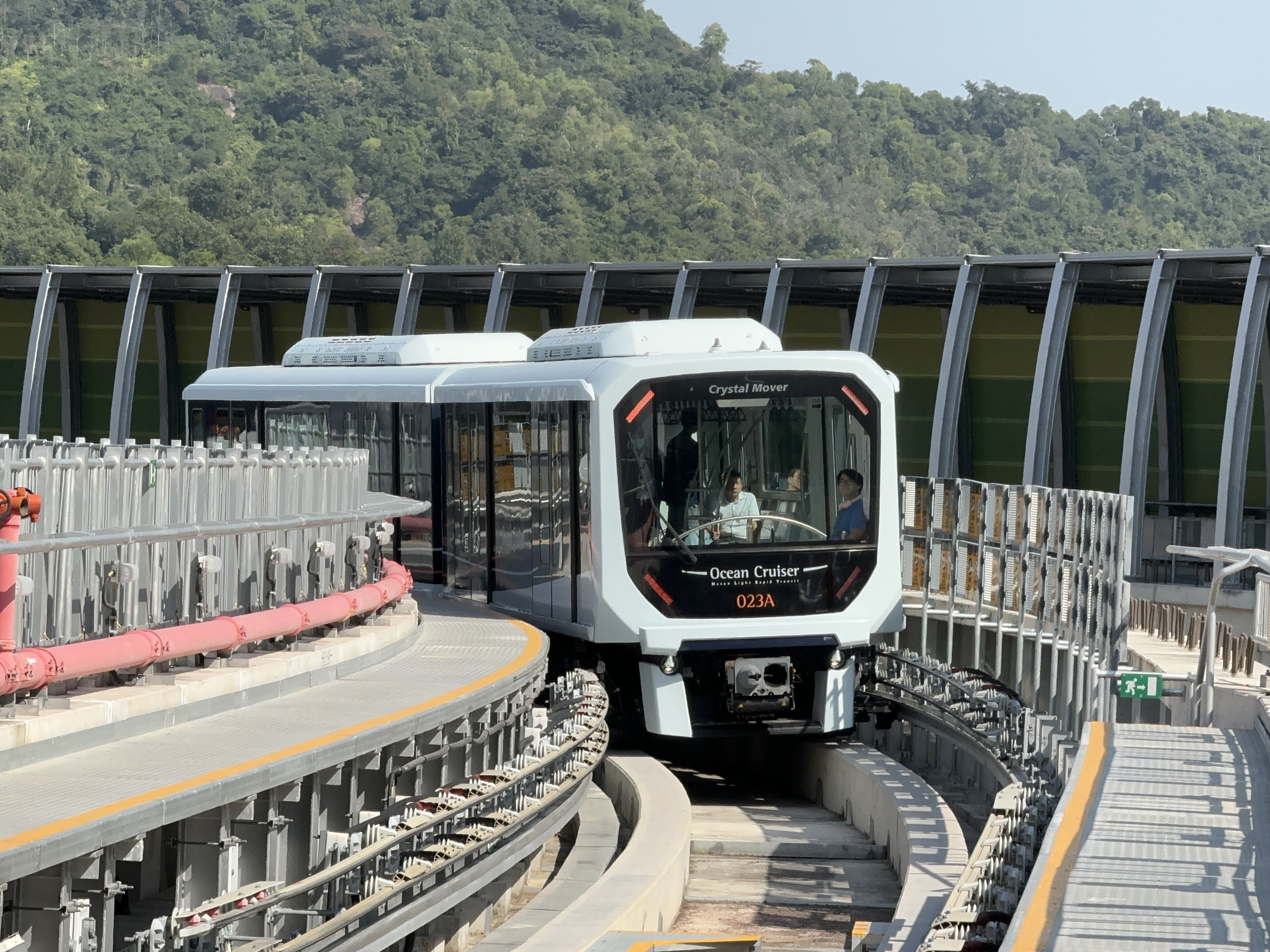

Overview
- Status: In Operation
- Owner: Macau
- Locale: Freguesia de São Francisco Xavier, Macau
- Termini: Union Hospital; Seac Pai Van
- Stations: 2

Service
- Type: Rapid transit
- System: Macau Light Rapid Transit
- Services: 1
- Operator: Macau Light Rapid Transit

History
- Opened: 1 November 2024

Technical
- Line length: 1.6 km (0.99 mi)
- Num of tracks: 2
- Character: Elevated

The Seac Pai Van line (Chinese: 石排灣線; Jyutping: sek6 paai4 waan1 sin3, Portuguese: Linha Seac Pai Van) is a line of the Macau Light Rapid Transit. The line operates as a shuttle between the Union Hospital station on the Taipa line and Seac Pai Van station on the reclaimed land of Seac Pai Van. The line is 1.6 km (0.99 mi) long. Trains available from 1 November 2024 and the first train departs from Seac Pai Van station at 13:11 that day. Further proposals have been made to extend the line further to Coloane Village.

== Stations ==
Station Info		Station name			Connections	Distance km	Freguesia/Zone
Livery	Station No.	English	Chinese	Portuguese	Connections	Distance km	Freguesia/Zone
	18A	Union Hospital	協和醫院	Hospital Union	Taipa		Zona do Aterro de Cotai
	18B	Seac Pai Van	石排灣	Seac Pai Van			Freguesia de São Francisco Xavier
