= Conde S. Januário Hospital =

Hospital in Sé, Macau, China

Coordinates: 22.194168°N 113.546721°E

Conde S. Januário Hospital 仁伯爵綜合醫院 Centro Hospitalar Conde de São Januário

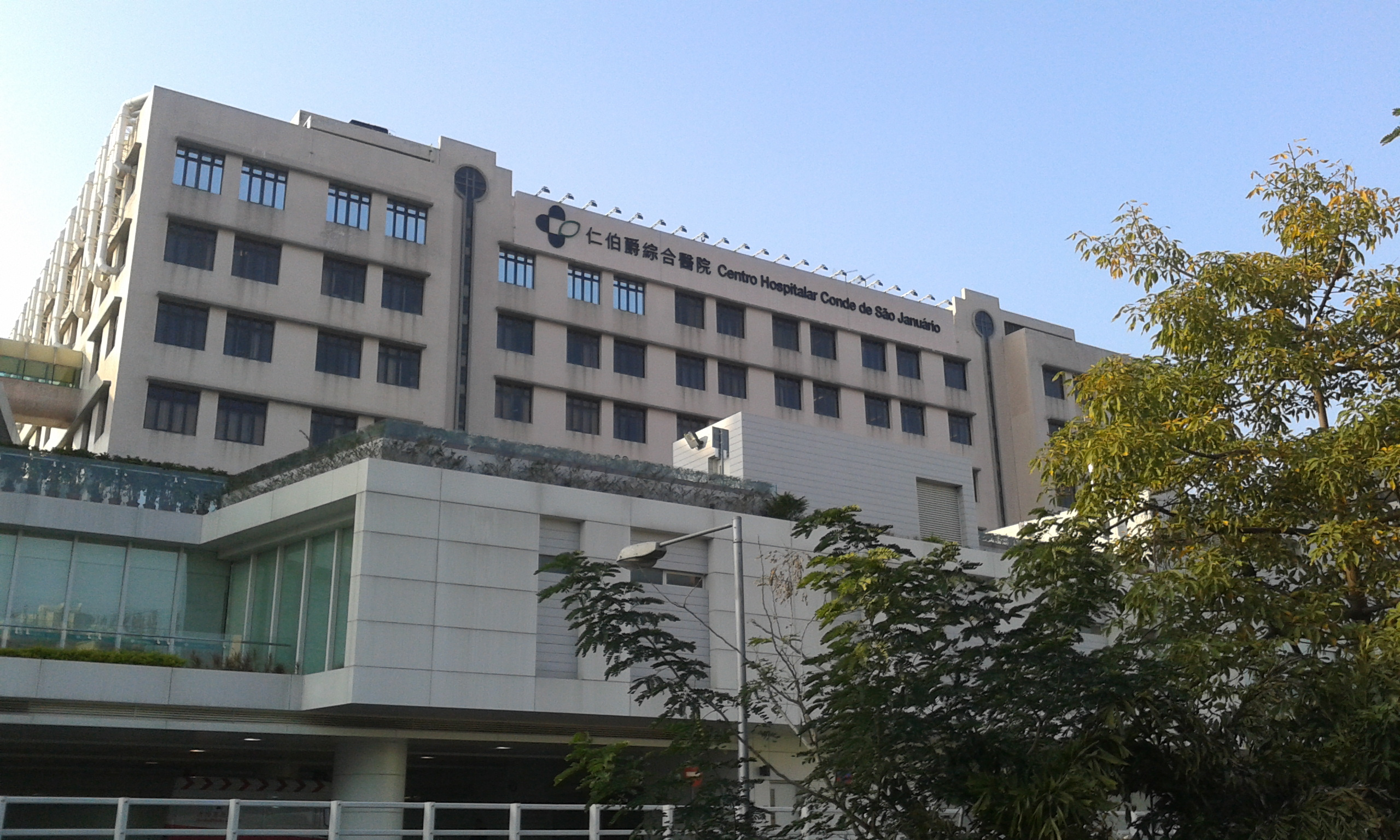

Geography
- Location: Guia Hill, Macau Peninsula, Macau

Organisation
- Care system: Medicare Resources
- Funding: Government hospital
- Type: District General
- Affiliated university: None

Services
- Emergency department: Yes, Accident and Emergency
- Beds: 476
- Helipad: Yes

History
- Opened: 1874

Links
- Website: Hospital Center of CSJ

Conde S. Januário Hospital

Chinese name
- Traditional Chinese: 仁伯爵綜合醫院
- Simplified Chinese: 仁伯爵综合医院
Transcriptions
Standard Mandarin
- Hanyu Pinyin: Rén Bójué Zōnghé Yīyuàn
Yue: Cantonese
- Jyutping: jan4 baak3 zoek3 zung3 hap6 ji1 jyun6*2

Portuguese name
- Portuguese: Centro Hospitalar Conde de São Januário

Conde S. Januário Hospital (Chinese: 仁伯爵綜合醫院; Portuguese: Centro Hospitalar Conde de São Januário; CHCSJ) is an acute care district general hospital run by the public sector in Sé, Macau.

Established in 1874 and extended in 1989, it has 476 beds and offers 22 different services, both for inpatients and for outpatients. The hospital is colloquially known as 'Hill-top Hospital' (山頂醫院) by the majority of local people. Herein, the 'Hill' refers to the Guia Hill (東望洋山 or 松山).

Until 2019, there was no western-style medical school in Macau, so all prospective doctors from Macau have to qualify outside of Macau. Alternatively, qualified doctors could be brought in from outside. Macau University of Science and Technology started a medical school in Macau in September 2019 for its MBBS program. The second batch of students started their classes on 21 September 2020. Clinical training of medical students will start from third year of medical training in the university hospital associated with the university. The medical school has been listed in the world directory of medical schools. Medium of instruction in the medical school is English. Most of the students are from Macau. The duration of MBBS course is 5 years with an additional year for internship.

The hospital is accredited by The Australian Council on Healthcare standards (ACHS) from 2012.

== Departments ==
- Out-patient Consultations
- Emergency department
- Operation Block
- Intensive Care Unit
- Burns Unit
- Physical and Rehabilitation Medicine
- Imagiology
- Laboratories

== See also ==
- Healthcare in Macau
- International healthcare accreditation
- List of hospitals in Macau
- List of hospitals in China
