= List of hospitals in Macau =

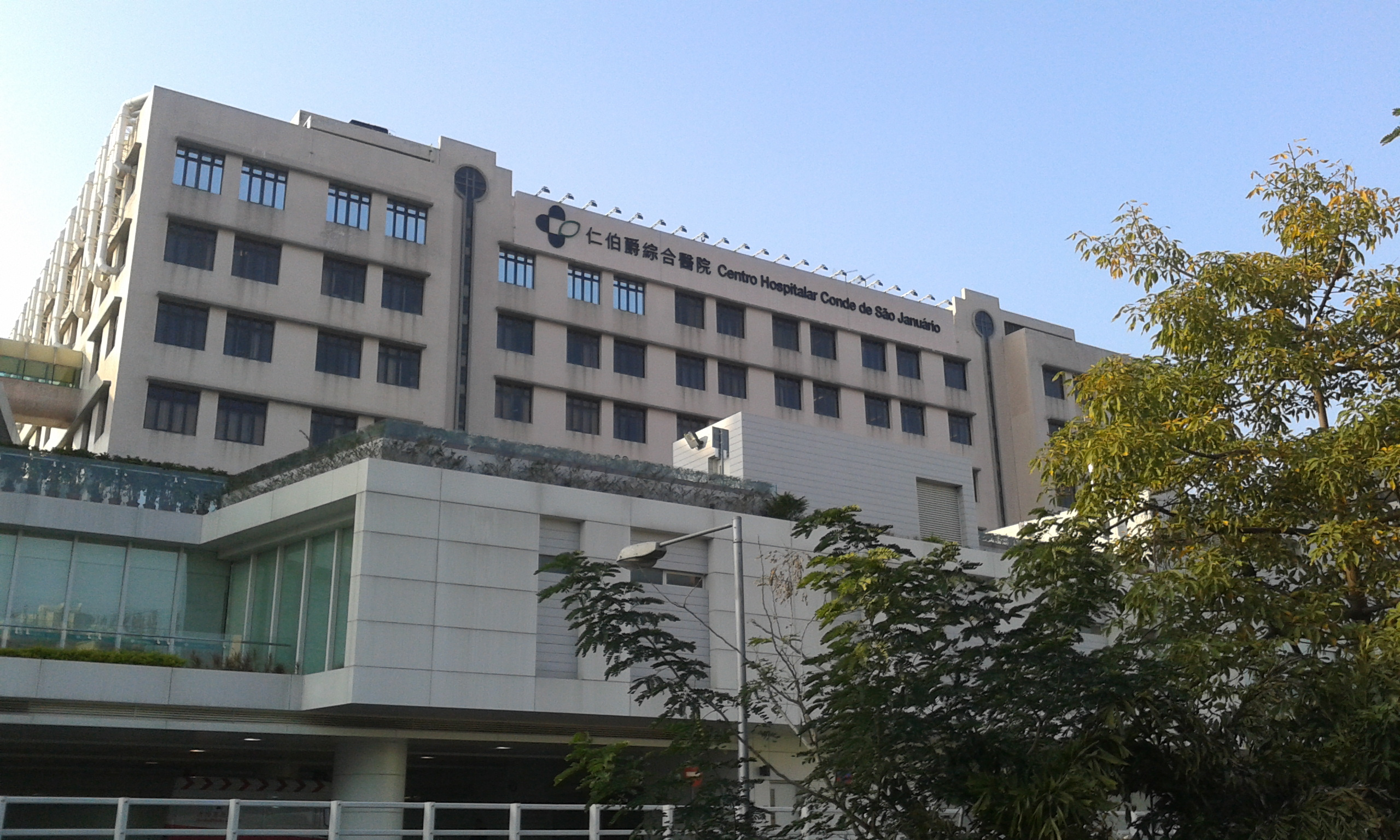
Conde S. Januário Hospital

There are five hospitals in Macau providing basic and primary health care services to the people of Macau:

- Hospital Conde S. Januário – public hospital
- Complexo de Cuidados de Saúde das Ilhas - Centro Médico de Macau do Peking Union Medical College Hospital – public hospital
- Kiang Wu Hospital – private hospital
- Macau University of Science and Technology Hospital (also known as MUST Hospital or University Hospital) – private hospital
- Macau Yinkui Hospital – private hospital (www.yinkui.com.mo)

== List of health centres in Macau ==
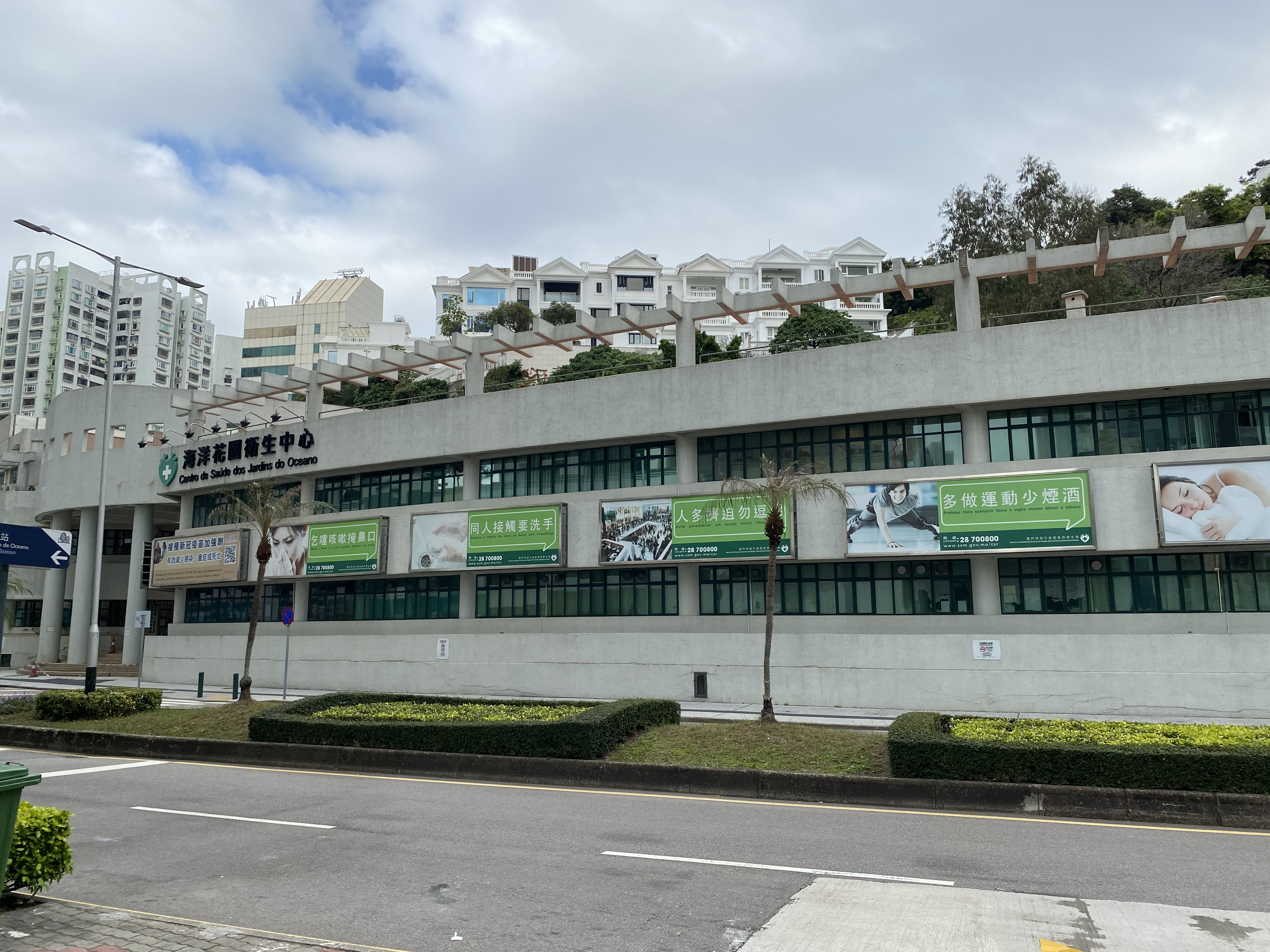
Ocean Gardens Health Centre

The following are health centres operated by the Macau government.

- Hac Sa Wan Health Centre (Areia Preta)
- Fai Chi Kei Health Centre
- Ilha Verde Health Centre
- Tap Seac Health Centre
- Hoi Pong Health Centre (Porto Interior)
- Praia do Manduco Health Centre
- Ocean Gardens Health Centre
- Nossa Senhora do Carmo – Lago Health Centre
- Seac Pai Van Health Centre

== Former hospitals ==
St. Raphel's Hospital opened in 1569 and was the first hospital in China and Macau to offer Western medicine. It closed in 1974 to focus on elderly care. It is now home to the Consulate of Portugal in Macau.

== See also ==
- Healthcare in Macau
- List of hospitals in China
