= Healthcare in Macau =

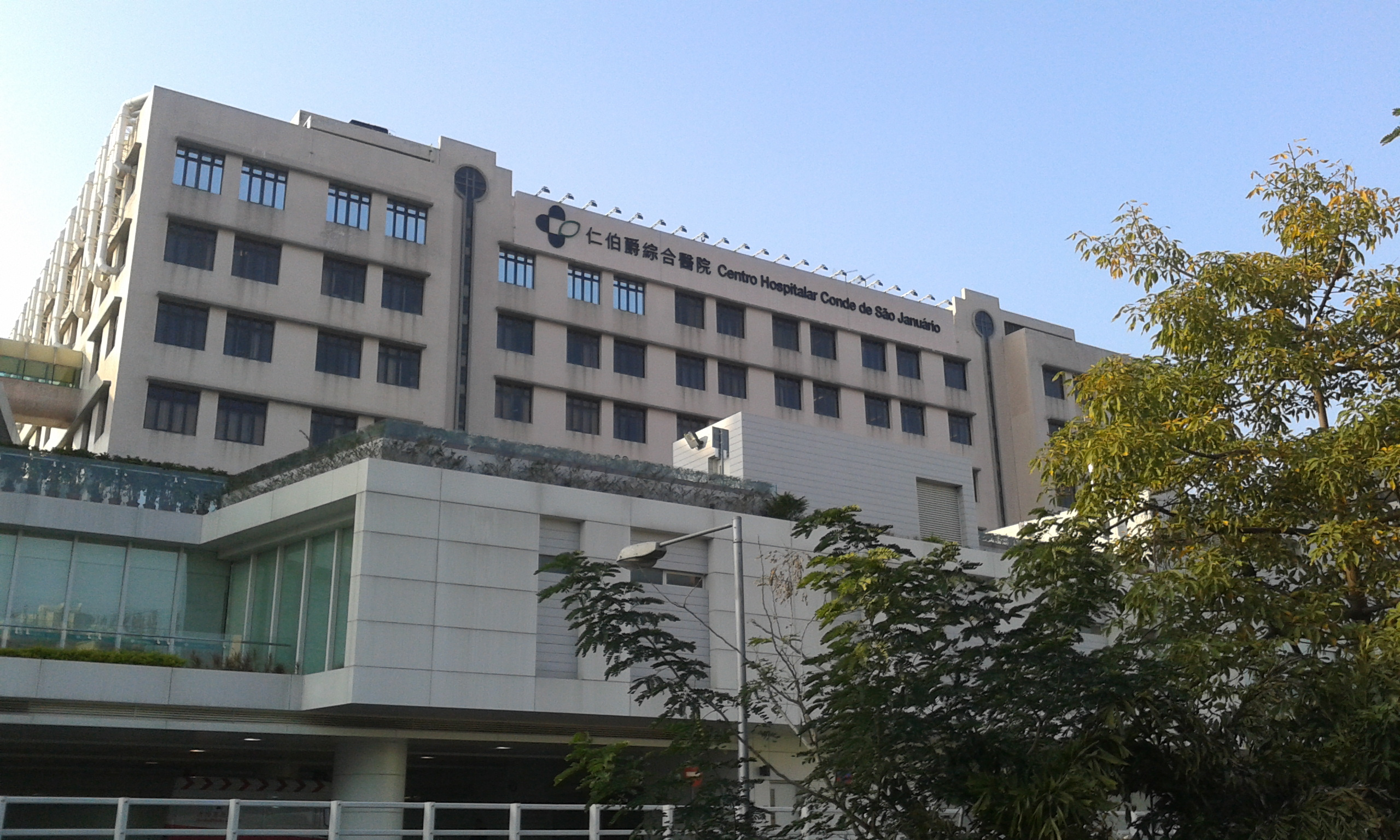
Conde S. Januário Hospital

Macau has a universally accessible single-payer system funded by taxes collected by the government from corporations and residents.

Macau is served by one major public hospital, the Hospital Conde S. Januário, and one major private hospital, the Kiang Wu Hospital, both located in Macau Peninsula, as well as a university-associated hospital called Macau University of Science and Technology Hospital in Cotai and a minor private hospital, the Macau Yinkui Hospital on the Macau Peninsula. Currently none of the Macau hospitals have international healthcare accreditation.

In addition to hospitals, Macau also has numerous health centres providing free basic medical care to residents. Consultation in traditional Chinese medicine is also available. Hospital Conde S. Januário was accredited by the Australian Council on Healthcare Standards International (ACHSI) in 2012, 2016, and 2024.

The Macau University of Science and Technology started a medical school in Macau in September 2019 for its MBBS program. The second batch of students started their classes on 21 September 2020. Clinical training of medical students will start from third year of medical training in the university hospital associated with the university. The medical school has been listed in the world directory of medical schools. Medium of instruction in the medical school is English. Most of the students are from Macau. The duration of MBBS course is 5 years with an additional year for internship.

Local nurses are trained at the Macao Polytechnic University and the Kiang Wu Nursing College of Macau. There is no midwife registration system in Macau. Midwifery services are provided by Obstetrics and Gynecology Nurse Specialists.

As of 2016, Macau healthcare authorities sent patients to Queen Mary Hospital in Hong Kong in instances where the local Macau hospitals were not equipped to deal with their scenarios, and many Macau residents intentionally sought healthcare in Hong Kong because they placed more trust in Hong Kong doctors than in Mainland-trained doctors operating in Macau.

== See also ==
- Areia Preta Health Center
- List of hospitals in Macau
