= Pousada Marina Infante =

Coordinates: 22°8′58″N 113°33′2″E

- 皇庭海景酒店 (Yue Chinese)
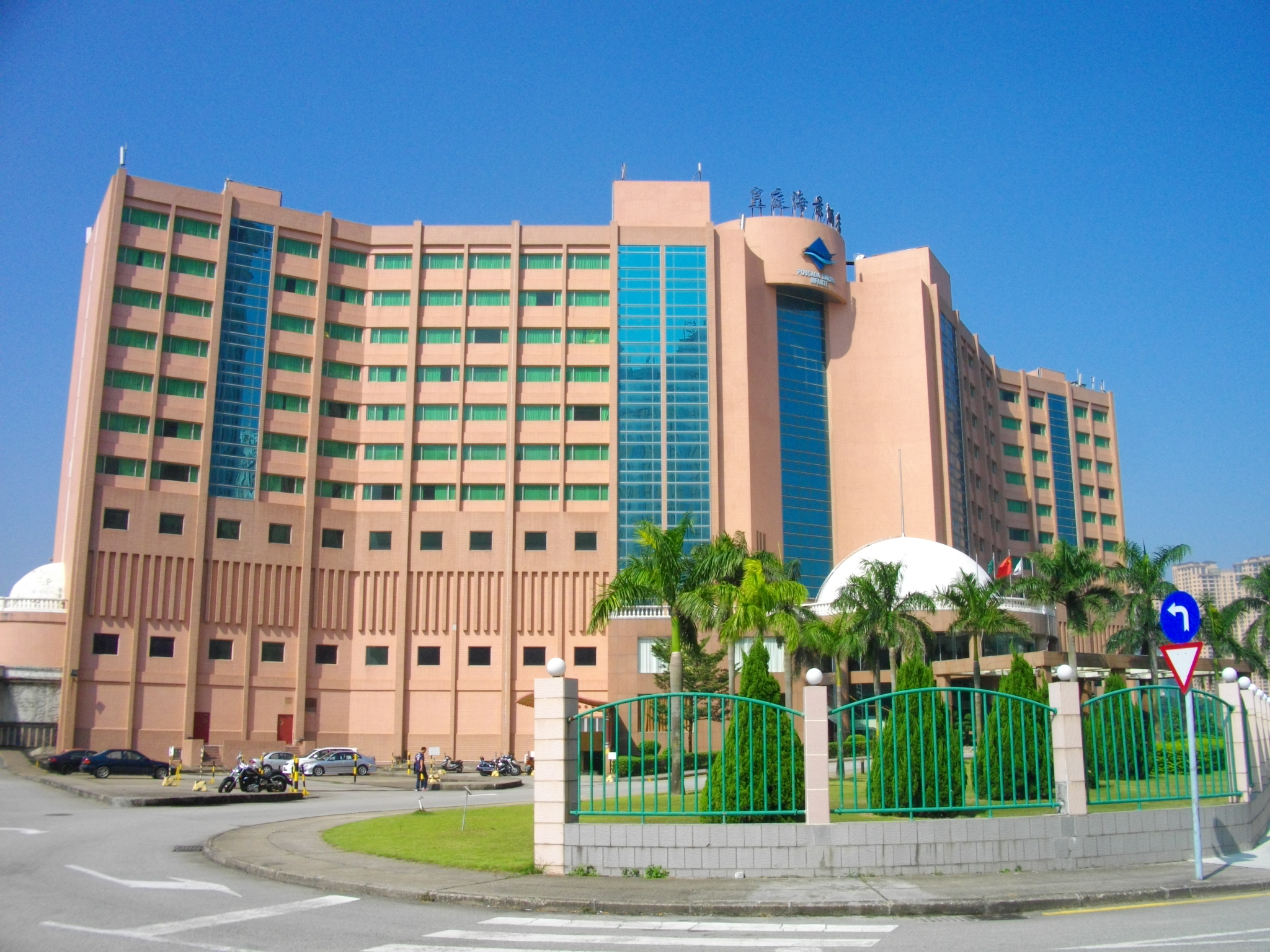
- Interactive map of the Pousada Marina Infante area

General information
- Location: Cotai, Macau, Aterro Cotai, Marina da Taipa Sul, Macau, China
- Opening: December 1999

Technical details
- Floor count: 11

Other information
- Number of rooms: 312
- Number of restaurants: 2
- Parking: Available

Website
- https://www.pousadamarinainfante.com

Pousada Marina Infante (Chinese: 皇庭海景酒店) is a 4-star hotel located at Cotai, Macau, China. Its services include a business center, safe deposit boxes, laundry services and more.

The hotel originally had a small gambling room named Casino Marina, but it has been closed indefinitely since at least 2010.

== See also ==
- Gambling in Macau
- List of properties on the Cotai Strip
- List of Macau casinos
