= Seac Pai Van station =

Macau Light Rapid Transit station

Coordinates: 22.1314°N 113.5616°E

Seac Pai Van 石排灣
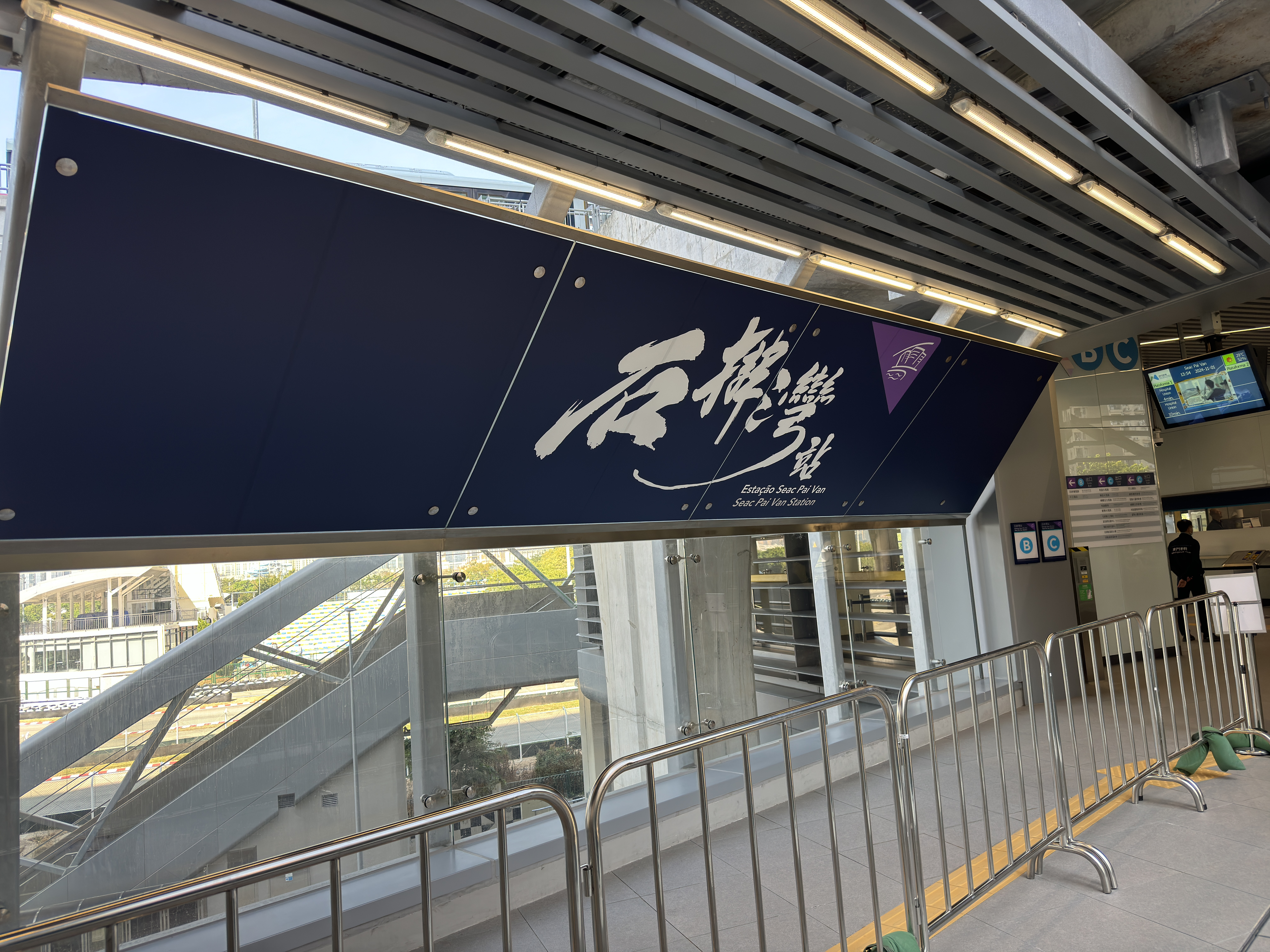

General information
- Location: Seac Pai Van, Coloane
- Operated by: Macao Light Rapid Transit Corporation, Limited
- Line(s): Seac Pai Van
- Platforms: 1 Island platform
- Tracks: 2

Construction
- Structure type: Elevated station

Other information
- Status: Operational
- Station code: SPV

History
- Opened: November 1, 2024

Services
Preceding station	Macau Light Rapid Transit	Following station
Union Hospital Terminus	Seac Pai Van line	Terminus
Route map
Location

Seac Pai Van station (Chinese: 石排灣站, Portuguese: Estação do Seac Pai Van) is a terminal station of the Seac Pai Van Line of the Macau LRT in Coloane. This elevated station's main construction was completed in March 2024 and officially opened on November 1, 2024. The station connects to the Seac Pai Van public housing complex via a pedestrian bridge.

== Layout ==
=== Concourse ===
The concourse houses a customer service center, ticket machines, fare gates, ticketing information, street maps, and exit signage.

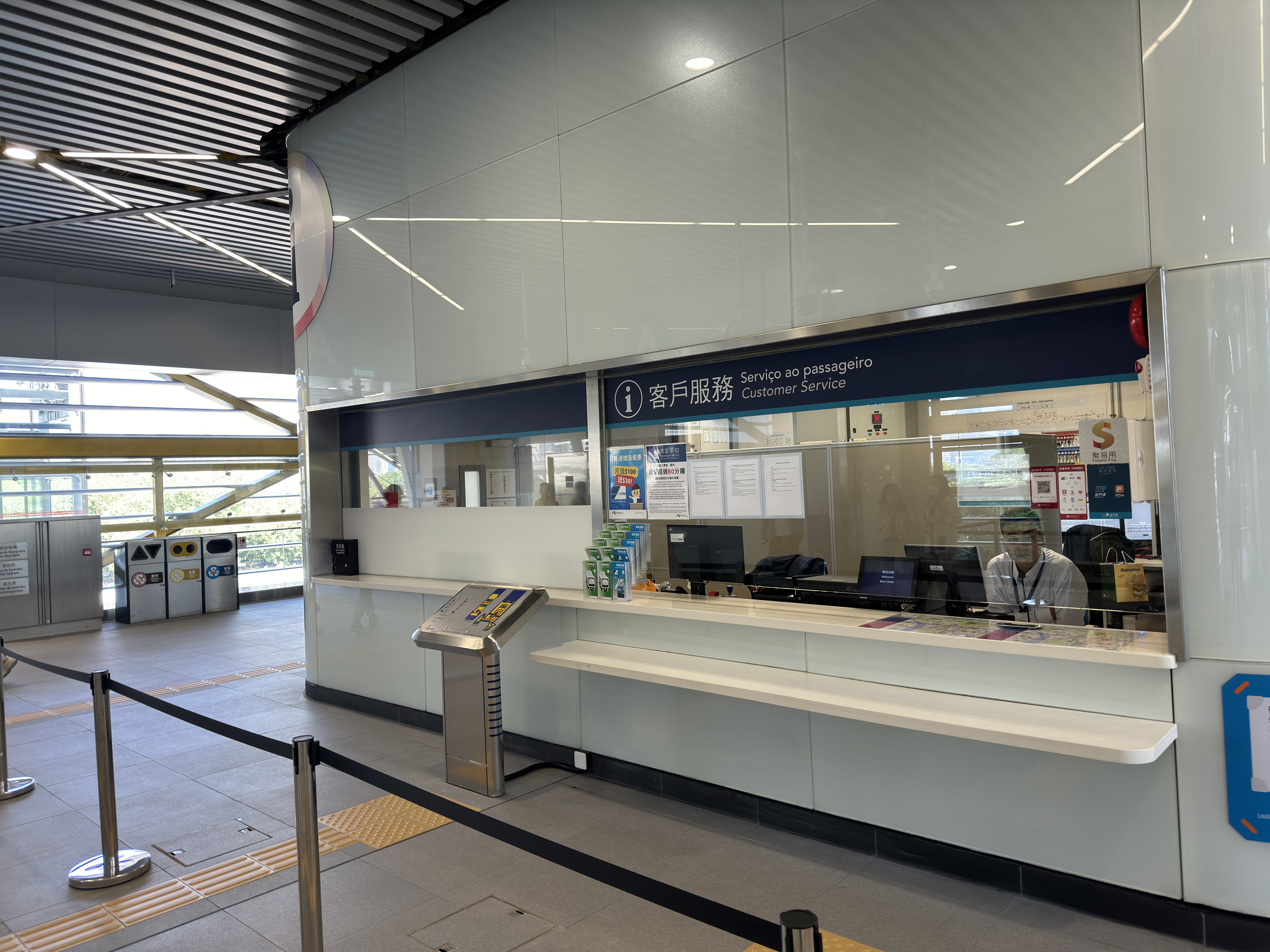
Customer service center

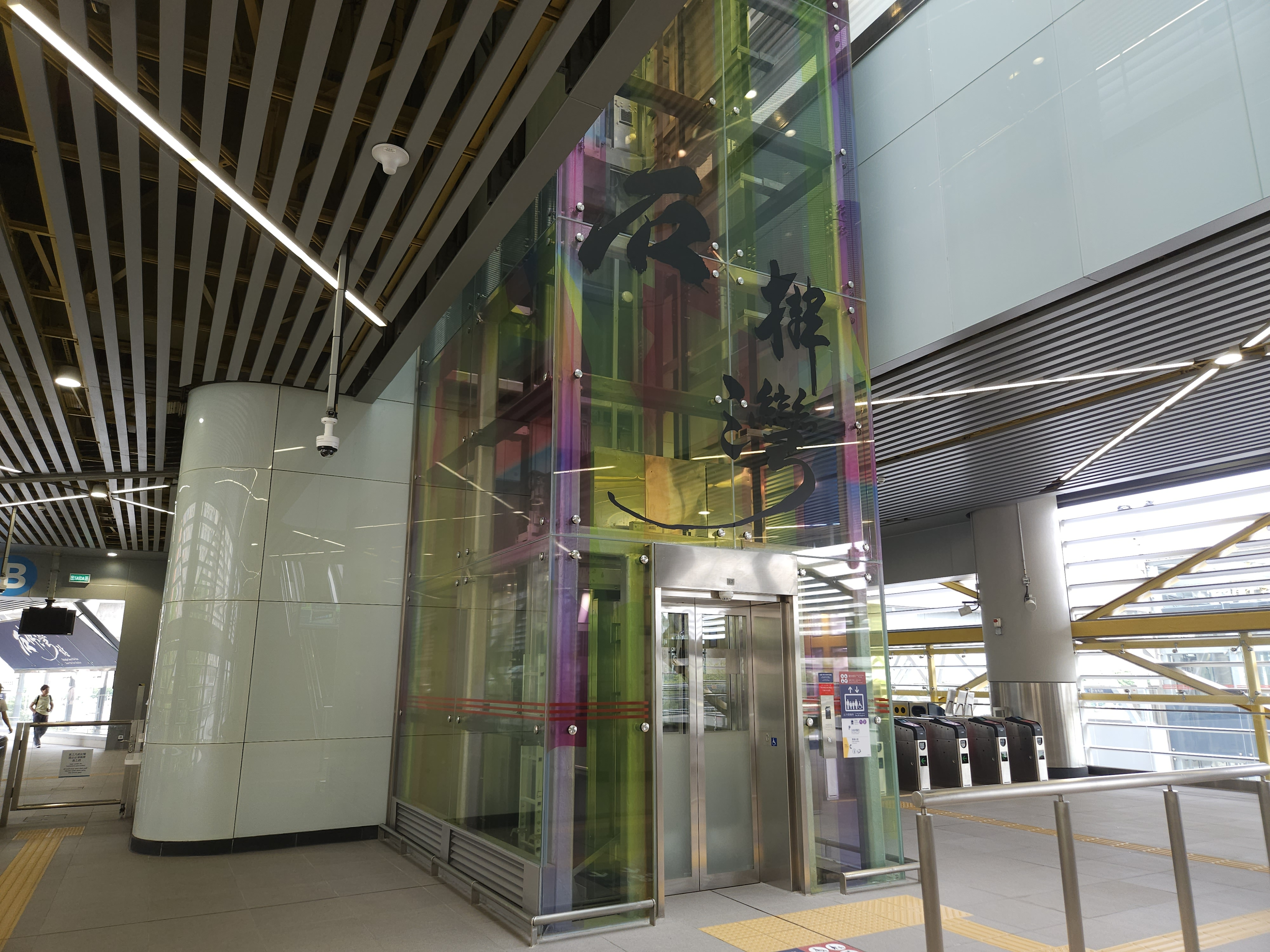
Elevator connecting the concourse and platforms

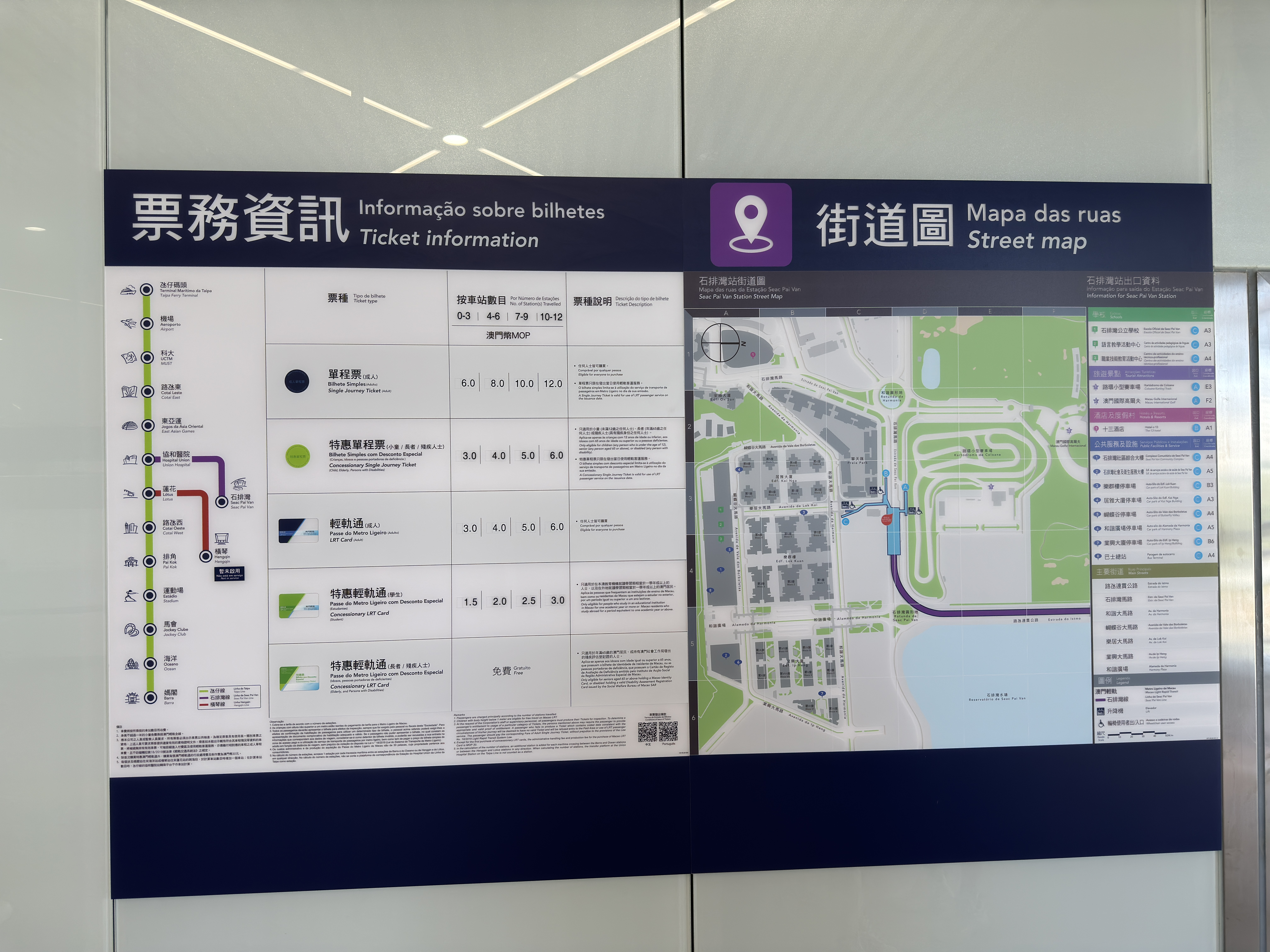
Ticketing information and street map

=== Platforms ===
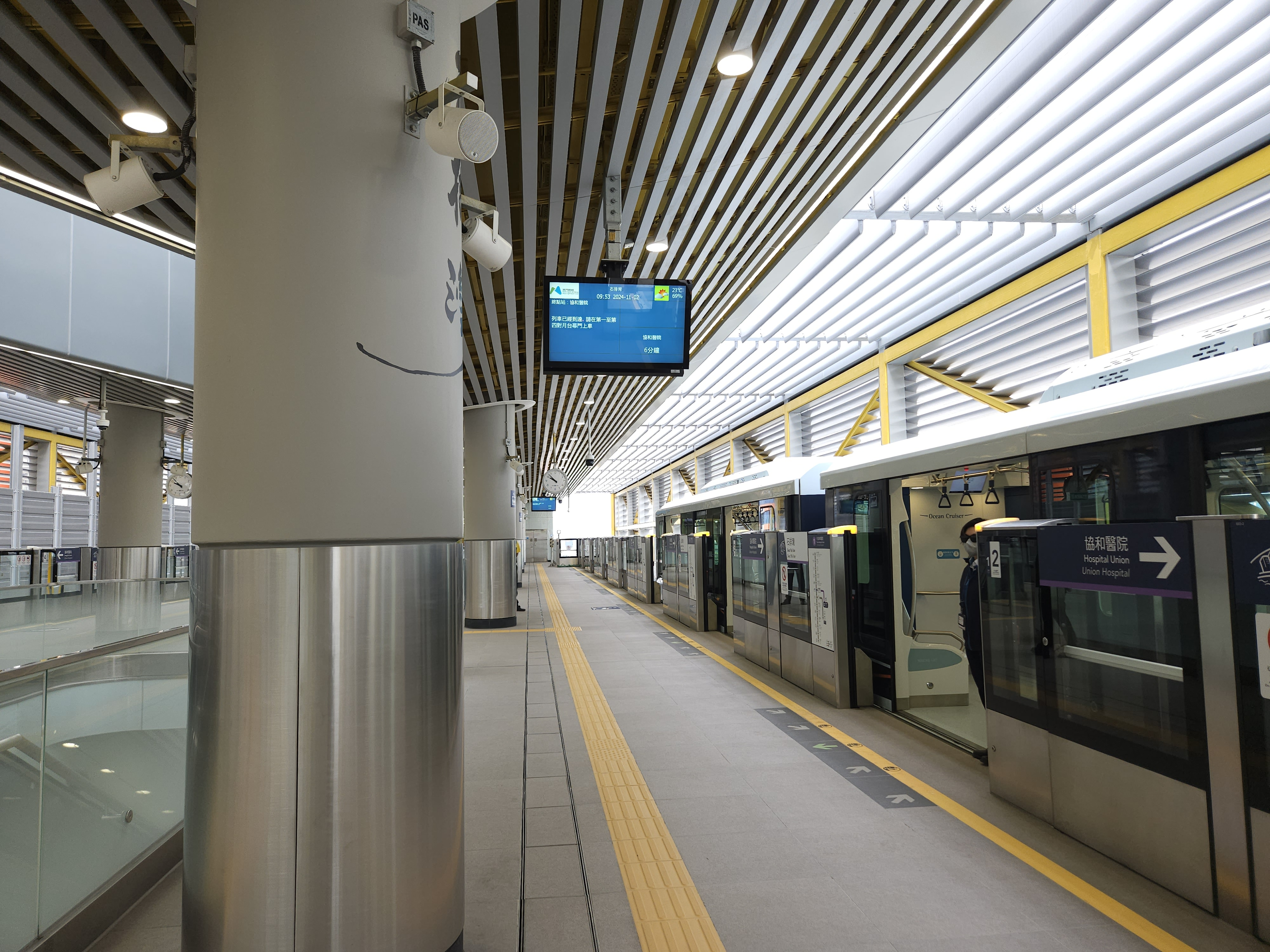
Platform 1

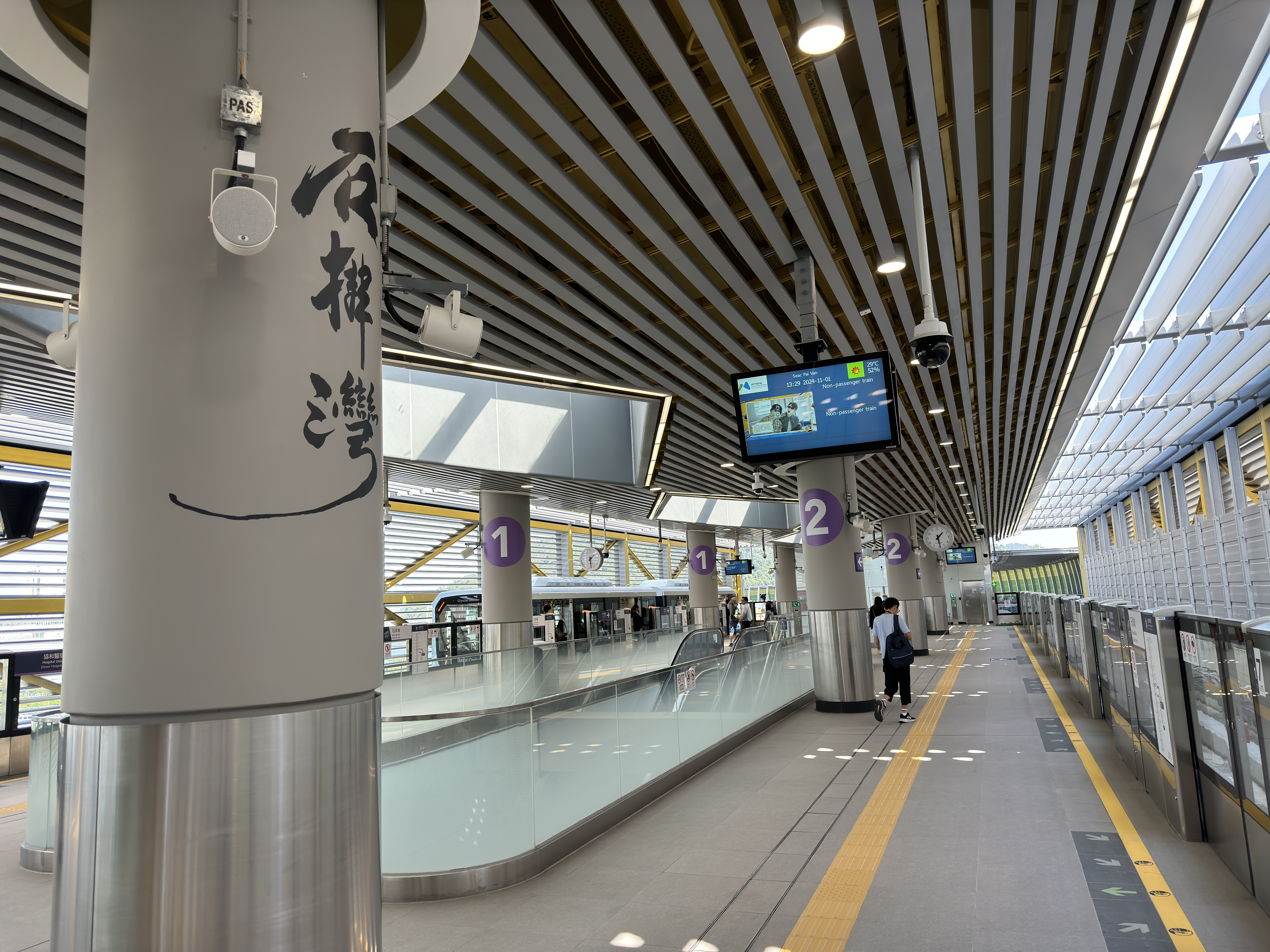
Platform 2 (backup platform)

=== Exits ===
The station has three exits and an emergency exit. The exits are located on both sides of Seac Pai Van Road. Two exits are near the Coloane Karting Track, and the exit near Estrada do Istmo is designated as the emergency exit. A pedestrian bridge is planned to connect Avenida da Harmonia and Avenida de Lok Koi, with the Direcção dos Serviços de Obras Públicas finalizing plans for the Seac Pai Van sky corridor in 2024, with construction expected in 2025.

Number	Direction	Image	Nearby Destinations
	Coloane Karting Track		Coloane Karting Track; Caesars Golf Macau
	Estrada de Seac Pai Van		The 13 Hotel; Praia Park
	Avenida da Harmonia		Avenida de Lok Koi; Praia Park; Complexo de Habitação Pública de Seac Pai Van; Escola Oficial de Seac Pai Van; Complexo Comunitário de Seac Pai Van; Edifício de Serviços Sociais e de Saúde de Seac Pai Van; Av. Vale das Borboletas / Terminal
