= Medicare Resources =

Hong Kong non government organisation

Medicare Resources Ltd.
- Type: Charity
- Founded: 1995 in Hong Kong
- Headquarters: Hong Kong
- Website: medicarer.org.hk

Medicare Resources (Chinese: 香港醫療關懷) is a Hong Kong–based non-government organisation that provides medical and social services to people in need in China. The organisation was registered in March 1997 and formally established in July 1997. It set up the Loving Heart Clinic (愛心診所) in Wuhan (武漢) as a base. The organisation focuses on aiding underprivileged communities and incorporates Christian values in its work.

== Overview ==
Acknowledging the insufficient medical and social welfare system in China, especially in villages, Medicare Resources Ltd allocates the donation it receives mostly from US, Canada and Hong Kong, to help a wide range of targets. Its services range from supporting individuals such as injured patients who cannot afford high medical expenses, or sponsoring outstanding students who are financially incapable in receiving university education, to subsidising institutions such as primary and secondary schools where there are serious inadequacy of toilets and sleeping area.

To ensure independence from both the church and the PRC government, Medicare Resources Ltd takes on a position as a non-government organisation which is closely connected, but not directly subordinated to the church. Mutual trust is often a key for the three parties to co-operate in the actual operation of charity work.

== Mission ==
The primary mission of Medicare Resources Ltd is to improve the living conditions in China by providing medical and social services while incorporating Christian values. While rooted in Christian values the organisation offers assistance to people regardless of their religious affiliation.

== Characteristics ==
Medicare Resources Ltd is a special non-government organisation which is based in Hong Kong but focuses its social service work in China. It has close links with Evangelical Free Church of America but it is independent from the church. Before the handover of Hong Kong in 1997, as the issue of intervention of religion from the PRC government in China remained uncertain, Medicare Resources Ltd decided not to be established directly under the church. This independent characteristic enables Medicare Resources Ltd to do charity in a more direct and flexible way in China as it enjoys the advantage of having close connection with Evangelical Free Church of America and at the same time, the free space to self-administer.

Medicare Resources Ltd is a world-based non-government organisation. Even though the founder, John Neir, comes from Evangelical Free Church of America, Medicare Resources Ltd is a partner of Hong Kong–based Evangelical Free Church of China and accepts all donations from all around the world.

Medicare Resources Ltd was established as a "human-based" non-government organisation. It does not spend a lot on advertising and promotion; it spends most of its fund in Hubei, China where the service area is. Directors of Medicare Resources Ltd has close relationship with the officials and they benefited by constant visits to Hubei. This is meant for the staff to examine whether the funds are well spent in various projects.

Medicare Resources Ltd engages in charity work according to the will of God. It usually does not involve a lot of planning beforehand as it believes that God will plan everything beforehand. One example is the charity done in Fengjie. In 2000, the head of War-planning Bureau of Chongqing, who is interested in Christianity, visited the Evangelical Hospital at Hong Kong and met John Lee, the founder. The head arranged a meeting between Lee and the head of Hygiene Department of the province and they showed interest in co-operation with Medicare Resources Ltd. They gave 3 places for Lee to choose for co-operation and Medicare Resources picked Fengjie because the facilities of Qinglong were too old to improve while the situation of Wanzhou was not as urgent as Fengjie.

== Origin ==
John Neir, the founder of Medicare Resources Ltd, suffered from a malignant tumor in 1993. After exhausting chemotherapy, Neir left Evangel Hospital of Hong Kong in which he was the former Premier. Neir and his wife, being US missionaries of Evangelical Free Church, have strong collaboration with other missionaries. Mrs Neir got in touch with a missionary whose wife is a Chinese coming from Wuhan. So, Neir reached Pastor Mary Kwok from Wuhan who intended to launch a clinic to serve the medical needs of the poor people. Neir decided to co-operate with Seminary of Central Southern China (中南神學院) which Pastor Kwok is the head so as to help the needy of China. After planning from May 1995 to July 1997, Medicare Resources Ltd registered in Hong Kong as a non-government organisation. It is notable that the inspiration came before the establishment of Medicare Resources Ltd because Neir decided to establish the organisation after contacting Pastor Mary Kwok.

== Service areas ==
Medicare Resources Ltd focuses its medical and social services mainly in Wuhan (武漢) and Yichang (宜昌) which are located in Hubei (湖北省), and Fengjie (奉節) which is located in Chongqing province (重慶省).

== Achievements ==
=== Medical ===
Wuhan (武漢):

- The Loving Heart Clinic (愛心診所) was set up in Wuhan.

Yichang (宜昌):

- Two clinics, the Loving Heart Clinic and the Loving Virtue Clinic were set up in Yichang.
- A mobile clinic is set up to serve patients in rural area, it is usually free of charge or at a price much lower than market price which is affordable to the poor.
- Health Education Classes are held every two months in rural area free of charge.

Fenjie (奉節):

- Cooperate with Fengjie People's Hospital (奉節人民醫院) to provide medical service for the poor and the needy.
- Fund the Hospital a Medical Assistance Programme with RMB10,000 per month to support the extremely poor people.

=== Student support ===
Medicare Resources Ltd engages in direct subsidising high-school and university students with special needs and being a middleman between sponsors and the benefited.

=== Economic projects ===
Medicare Resources Ltd helps the economically disadvantaged in a sustainable way. Instead of giving them money directly, it hopes to increase their abilities to earn income. So, tea projects and pig projects were carried out since tea is a more value-added good than other agricultural products while piglets are given to the extremely poor peasants (特困戶) for investment.

=== Water projects ===
Several water projects in both Fengjie and Wufeng had been assisted to provide clean and safe water supply to local schools and community.

=== Community development ===
A dormitory was built for Kangping School (康坪中小學), a suburb in Fengjie.where students originally had no place to sleep other than on desks or floor at night. Also, funding was provided to Yichang community for road maintenance, especially a RMB 30,000 fund for explosives to clear 400 meters of boulders which blocked a completion of 8 km.

== Future plans ==
Medicare Resources Ltd is planning to set up a mobile clinic in Hankou (漢口).They will continue school project in Kangping (康坪), and will also expand their service in other parts of China such as Guizhou (貴州).
