= Seac Pai Van =

Coordinates: 22.14082°N 113.56310°E

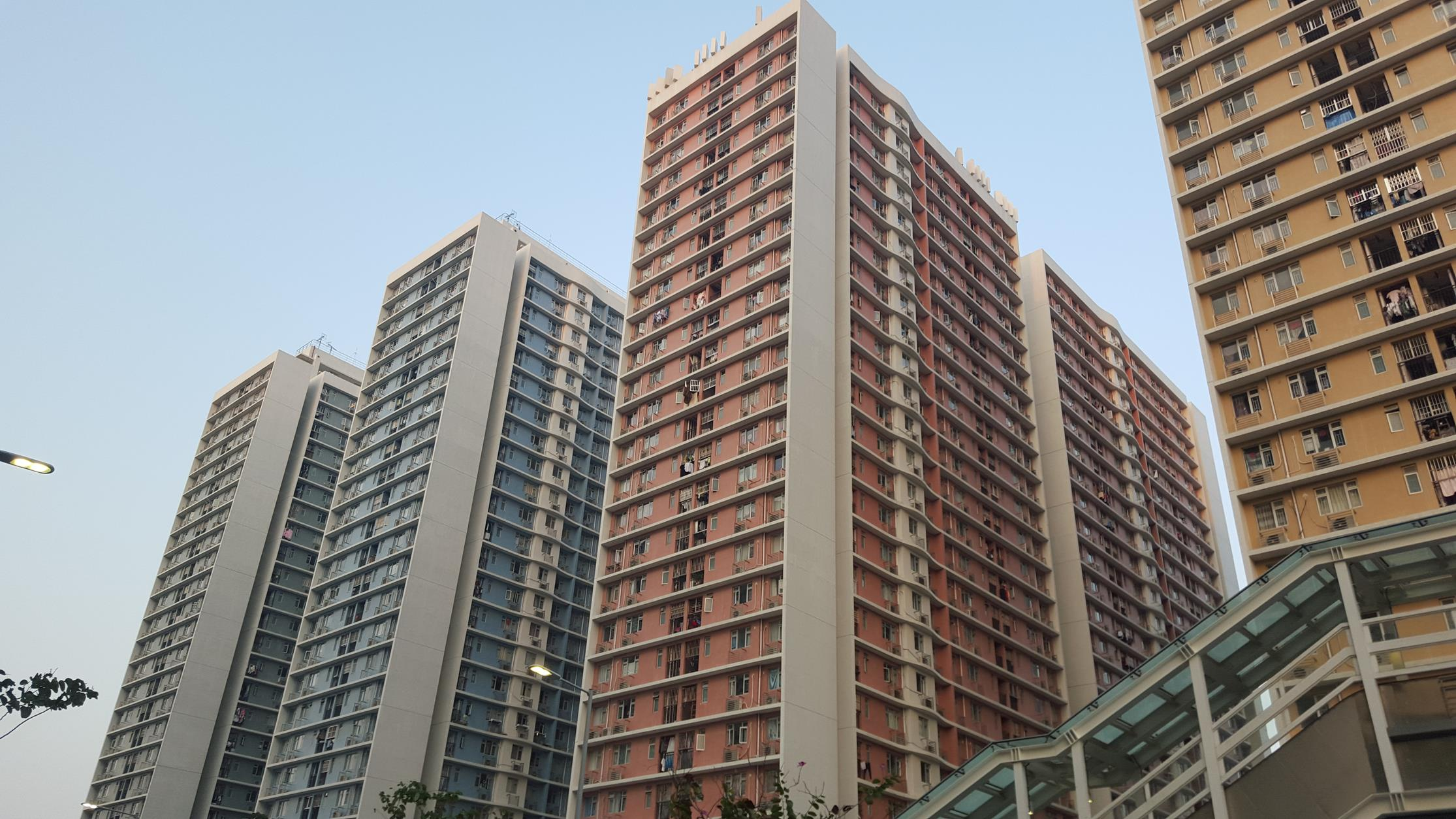
- Seac Pai Van in 2016

Chinese name
- Traditional Chinese: 石排灣
- Simplified Chinese: 石排湾
- Jyutping: sek6 paai4 waan1
- Literal meaning: Stone Row Bay
Transcriptions
Standard Mandarin
- Hanyu Pinyin: Shípáiwān
Yue: Cantonese
- Yale Romanization: Sehkpàaihwāan
- Jyutping: sek6 paai4 waan1

Portuguese name
- Portuguese: Baía da Seac Pai Van

Seac Pai Van (Portuguese: Baía da Seac Pai Van; Chinese: 石排灣) is an area in Macau, located south of the Cotai Strip and on the northeastern parts of Coloane.

Originally a bay that separated Coloane from Taipa, from the late 2000s it was reclaimed from the sea as a part of the combined island of Cotai, mostly to be turned into public housing.

== History ==
The Land, Public Works and Transport Bureau of Macau announced on September 11, 2009, its plans to build a brand new living area in Seac Pai Van with a population of 60,000, covering an area of about 300,000 square meters. Public housing was also to be built. In order to maintain the positioning of Coloane as the lung of Macau, the area would be heavily greened near the Luen Seng Industrial Estate and adjacent quarry, both of which were originally lacking in greenery, so as to harmonize the area with the scenery of the adjacent Seac Pai Van Park. In line with the government's environmental policies, natural gas was also to be introduced to the area.

In 2013, the Health Bureau of Macau moved its health service station in Coloane to Loc Kuan Mansion.

== Public housing ==
Seac Pai Van’s public housing flats are collectively known as the Seac Pai Van Public Housing Complex, which had four public housing projects built as of 2013. Those four public housing projects have names with such meanings as “security”, “housing”, “happiness”, and “business”. They include Edifício On Son, Edifício Koi Nga, Edifício Lok Kuan, and Edifício Ip Heng, all of which can accommodate a combined total of up to 50,000 people. Many government departments have also set up offices in this public housing complex.

== Private housing ==
Seac Pai Van is also home to a number of private real estate developments, including One Oasis, Praia Park and Lohas Park.

== Transport ==
Seac Pai Van is connected to the rest of Macau by the Cotai Highway. There are 6 bus stops in the area, namely Avenida Butterfly Valley Terminus, Alameda da Harmonia/Edificio Ip Hing, Alameda da Harmonia/Edificio Loc Kuan, Avenida de Loc Koi/Edificio Loc Kuan, Avenida de Loc Koi/Edificio Koi Nga, and Edificio On Son.

The Seac Pai Van line of the Macau LRT opened in 2024.

== See also ==
- Praia Grande Bay
- Hac Sa Beach
