= One Oasis =

Housing development in Macau

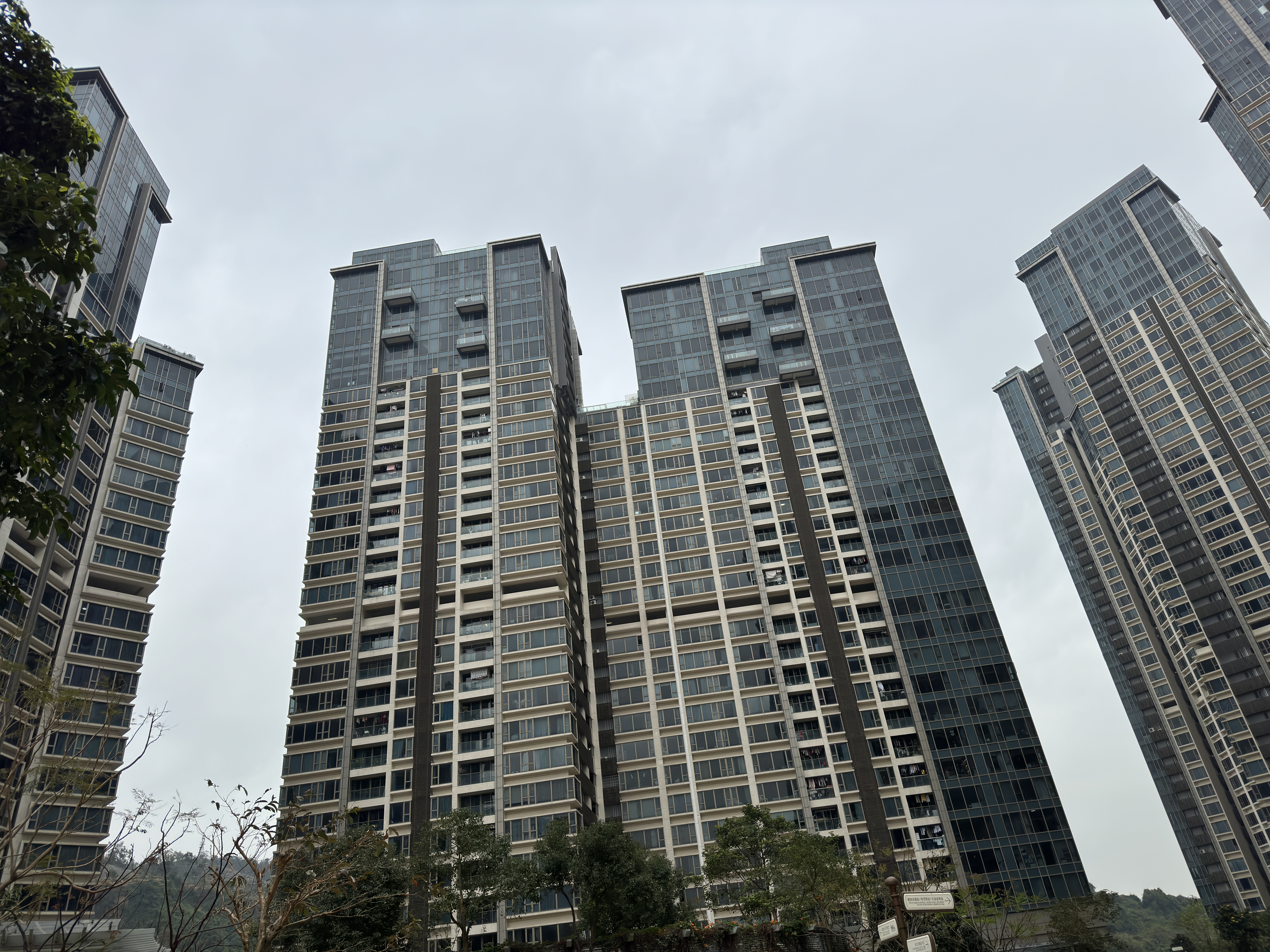
- Chinese: 金峰南岸
Transcriptions
Standard Mandarin
- Hanyu Pinyin: Jīnfēng Nán'àn
Yue: Cantonese
- Jyutping: gam1 fung1 naam4 ngon6

One Oasis is a residential complex development in Cotai, south of Macau. The community facilities in the development encompass a clubhouse, a retail center, a 6-star hotel, and cultural and entertainment conventions. Phase 1 of One Oasis comprises five low-density residential towers providing 870 units. The construction of Phase 1 was scheduled to be completed in the second quarter of 2013. An array of flat mixes studio, 1-bedroom, 2-bedroom, 3-bedroom units and, 4-bedroom en-suites are offered, ranging from approximately 600 sq ft (56 m^{2}), to over 2,000 sq ft (190 m^{2}). Special units contain duplexes and sky houses with a minimum area of 3,000 square feet.

== Location ==
One Oasis is situated in Cotai, which embraces the world-famous casino resorts including the Venetian Macau and City of Dreams. A slew of new integrated resorts and hotels such as Galaxy Resort, Sheraton Hotel, and St. Regis Hotel are open along the Cotai strip.

One Oasis borders an international-standard Caesars Golf Macao developed by the US-based Harrahs Group and also one of the largest country parks in Macau. In neighboring Hengqin, billions of dollars' worth of investment led by the Central Government of China are being funnelled into several developments, including the University of Macau Hengqin Campus, the largest ocean-themed park and resort in Asia, the new exhibition and creative business zone.

== Clubhouse ==
Club Oasis is a central clubhouse planned to be built inside a Southern European garden. Club Oasis brings over 100 clubhouse facilities and services, including indoor and outdoor swimming pools, banquet rooms, red wine tasting, billiard rooms, spa, and massage services.

== Transportation network ==
One Oasis includes a comprehensive transportation network spanning the Macau Light Transit System, Lotus Bridge, HK-Zhuhai-Macau Bridge, the underwater tunnel linking the University of Macau Hengqin Campus, Guangzhou-Zhuhai Intercity Railway and Beijing-HK-Macau Highway. The network enables effortless travel around Macau, Hong Kong, Mainland China, and the world in conjunction with shuttle bus services.

== Developers and Consultant teams ==
One Oasis' developers consist of Hong Kong-listed companies with developers, builders, and international investment institutions, including ITC Properties Group Limited, Linkeast Investments Limited, Nan Fung Group, ARCH Capital Management, and Success Universe Group.

One Oasis has appointed a team of consultants to undertake master planning, architecture, design, and property management. The design architect, US-based Moore Ruble Yudell (MRY), has had track records in Potatisakern and Tango projects in Sweden, Santa Monica Village in California, USA, and the Chun Sen Bi An Master Plan & Housing in Chongqing, China. The project architect of One Oasis, Archiplus International Limited has participated in Ponte 16 Casino & Sofitel Hotel. The landscape architect of One Oasis is AECOM, a Fortune 500 company, notable for their Tokyo Midtown and the Venetian Macau Resort Hotel. Savills is appointed as a property management consultant for the development.

Address	Cotai South, Macau
Developers	ITC Properties Group Limited, Linkeast Investments Limited, Nan Fung Group, ARCH Capital Management & Success Universe Group
No. of Blocks	5 Blocks in Phase 1
No. of Residential Units	870
No. of Floors	30 floors or 31 floors
Unit Types	Studio, 1-bedroom, 2-bedroom, 3-bedroom, 4-bedroom & special units
Completion Date	2013
Facilities	Southern European clubhouse, themed shopping arcade, cultural and entertainment facilities
website	www.oneoasis.com
