= Kiang Wu Hospital =

Hospital in São Lázaro, Macau, China

Coordinates: 22°11′55″N 113°32′32.72″E

Kiang Wu Hospital 鏡湖醫院
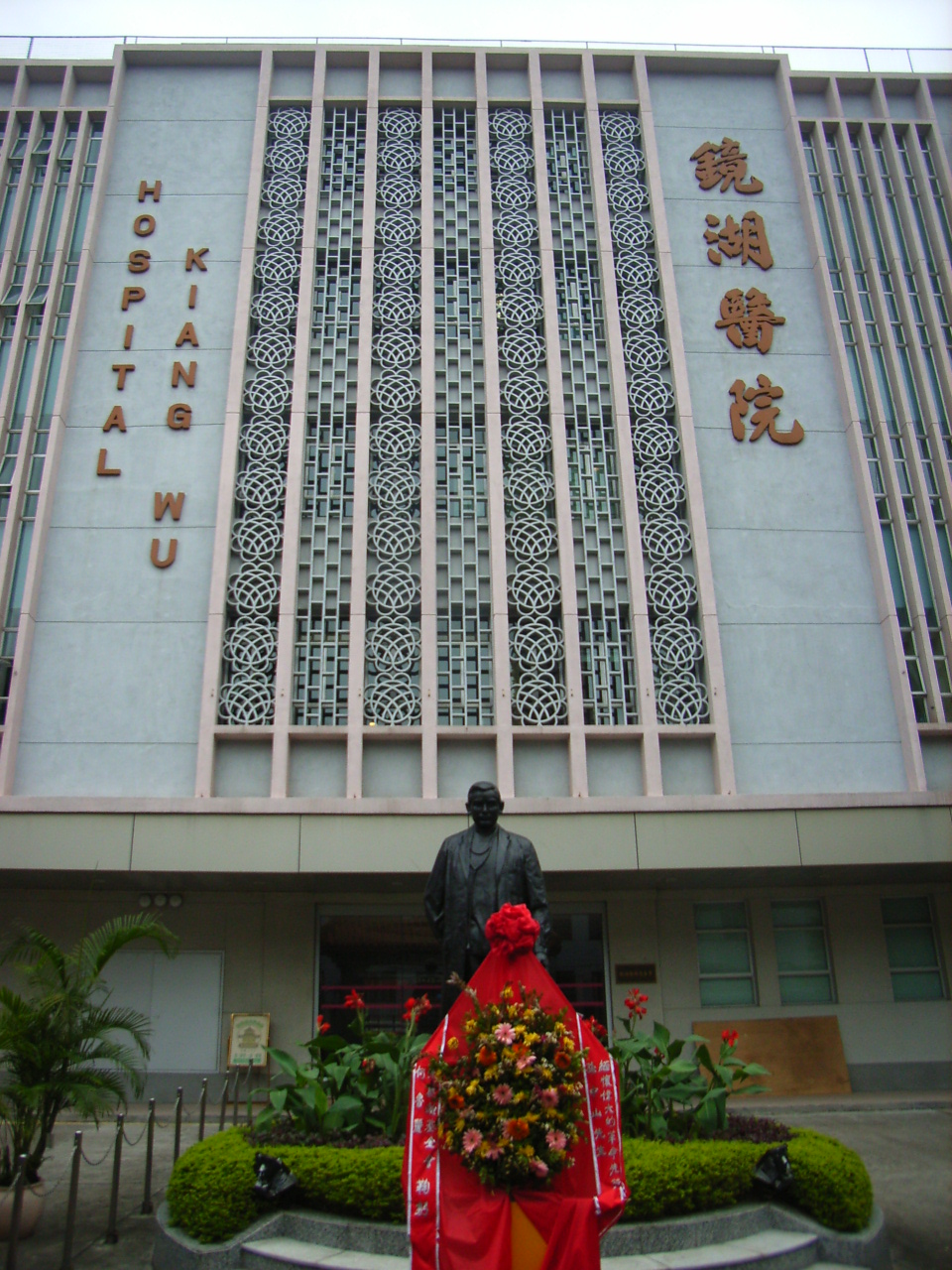
- The main entrance of the Hospital Kiang Wu

Geography
- Location: São Lázaro, Macau

Organisation
- Care system: Charitable hospital
- Type: District General
- Affiliated university: Kiang Wu Charitable Association

Services
- Emergency department: Yes, Accident and Emergency
- Beds: 466

History
- Founded: 1871

Links
- Website: http://www.kwh.org.mo/ Kiang Wu Hospital

Kiang Wu Hospital

Chinese name
- Traditional Chinese: 鏡湖醫院
- Simplified Chinese: 镜湖医院
Transcriptions
Standard Mandarin
- Hanyu Pinyin: Jìnghú Yīyuàn
Yue: Cantonese
- Jyutping: geng3 wu4 ji1 jyun6*2

Portuguese name
- Portuguese: Hospital Kiang Wu

Kiang Wu Hospital (KWH; Chinese: 鏡湖醫院) is a private district general hospital is located in Santo António, Macau. It is one of the five hospitals in Macau. Founded in 1871, the hospital is run by the Kiang Wu Charitable Association and offered Chinese medical services. Renowned doctor Sun Yat-Sen brought Western medicine services to the hospital. The hospital has had four different sites, the last built in 2000.

Till 2019 there was no Western-style medical school in Macau, so all indigenous intending doctors have to either qualify overseas, or qualified doctors have to be brought in from outside. Macau University of Science and Technology started a medical school in Macau in September 2019 for its MBBS program. The second batch of students started their classes on 21 September 2020. Clinical training of medical students will start from third year of medical training in the university hospital associated with the university. The medical school has been listed in the world directory of medical schools. Medium of instruction in the medical school is English. Most of the students are from Macau. The duration of MBBS course is 5 years with an additional year for internship.

The hospital is not currently engaged in international healthcare accreditation.

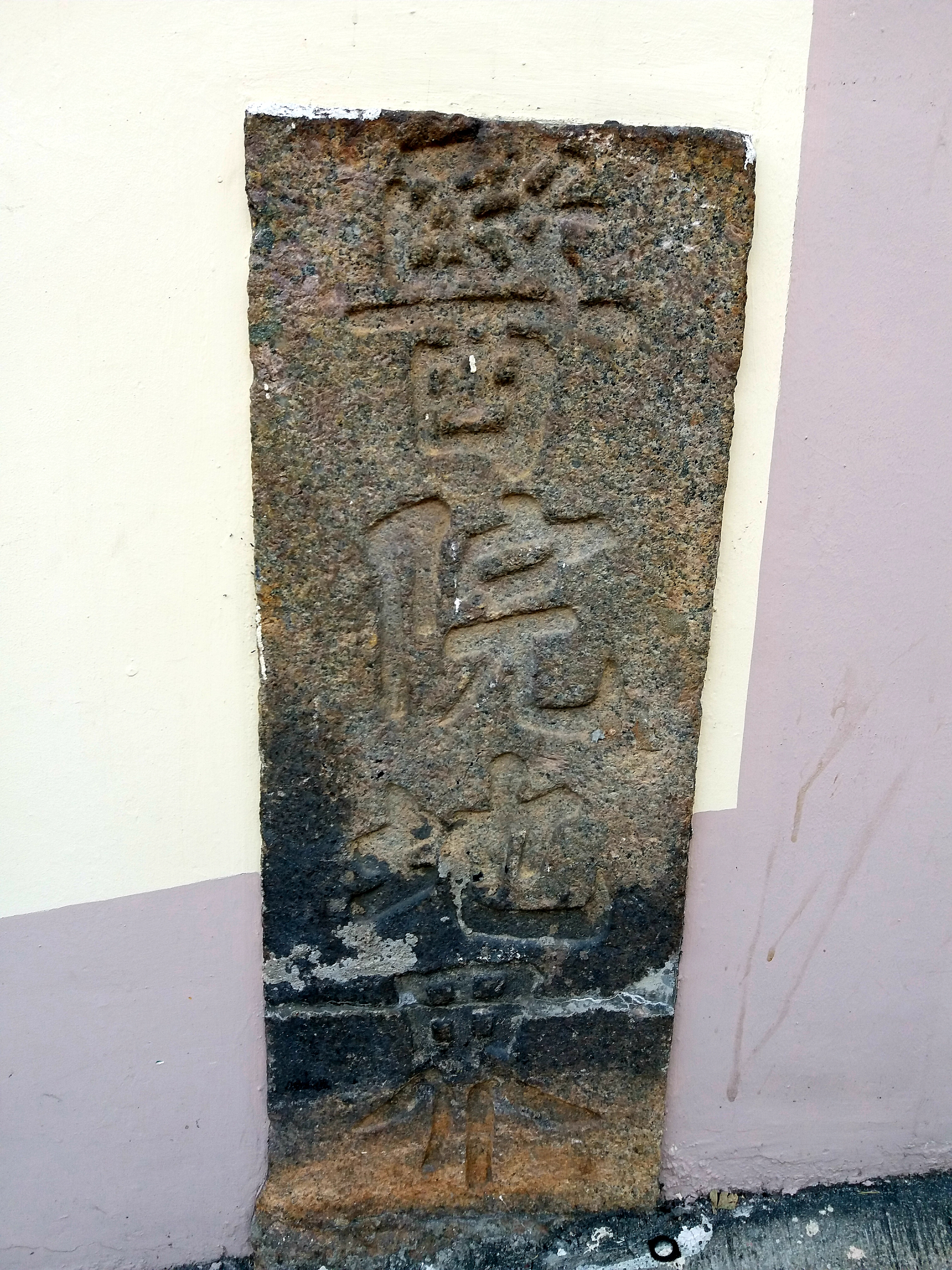
stele (wording in Chinese meaning "hospital boundary")outside Kiang Wu Hospital

== Staff ==
As of 2016, the hospital had over 340 doctors and over 800 nurses. The doctors were trained at universities in Mainland China and Taiwan, with about one-third each graduating from the School of Medicine at Jinan University and the Zhongshan School of Medicine. The nurses earned certificates in nursing at schools in Mainland China, at Macao Polytechnic University (formerly Macao Polytechnic Institute), and at Kiang Wu itself.

== Kiang Wu Nursing College of Macau ==
Kiang Wu Nursing College of Macau Instituto de Enfermagem Kiang Wu de Macau 澳門鏡湖護理學院
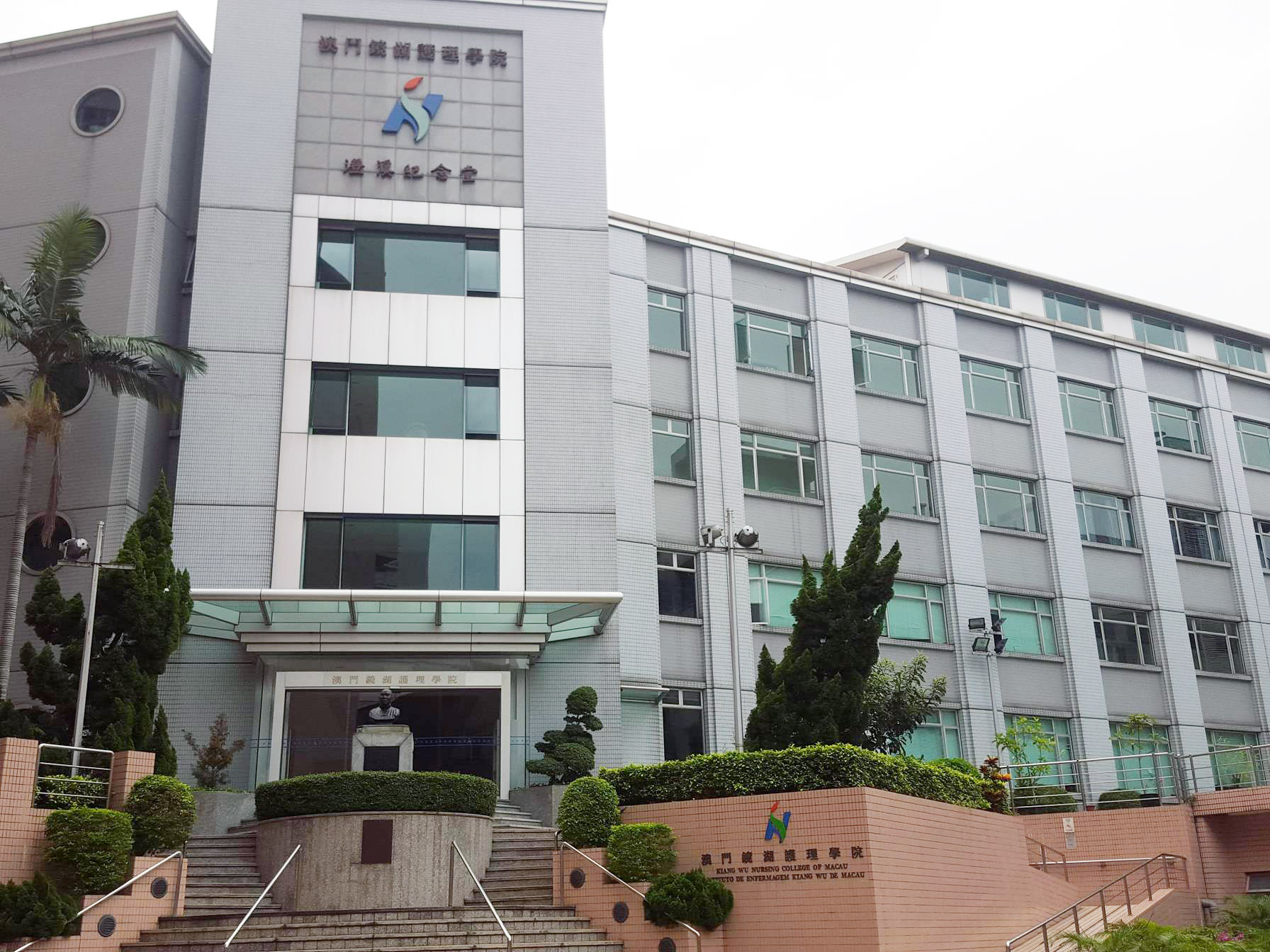
- Type: Private
- Established: 1923; 103 years ago
- President: Florence Van
- Location: Santo António, Macau

Established in 1923 as Kiang Wu Nursing School by the Kiang Wu Charitable Association and provided nursing staff for Kiang Wu Hospital. It became a degree granting college (Bachelor of Science in Nursing) in 2002.

== See also ==
- Healthcare in Macau
- List of hospitals in Macau
- List of hospitals in China
