= Cotai =

Coordinates: 22.14082°N 113.56310°E

Cotai 路氹城 Cotai
- Zone
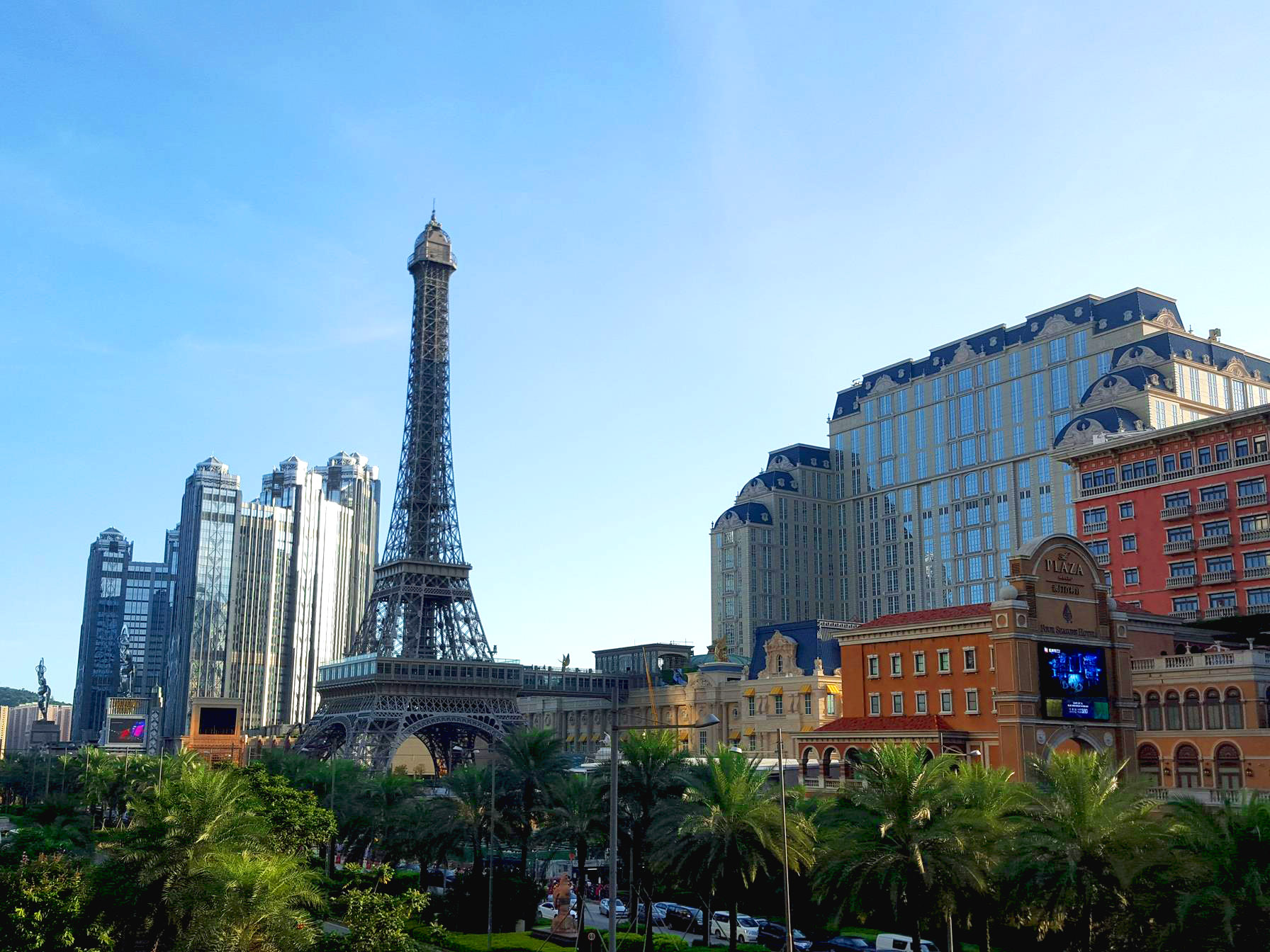
- Cotai

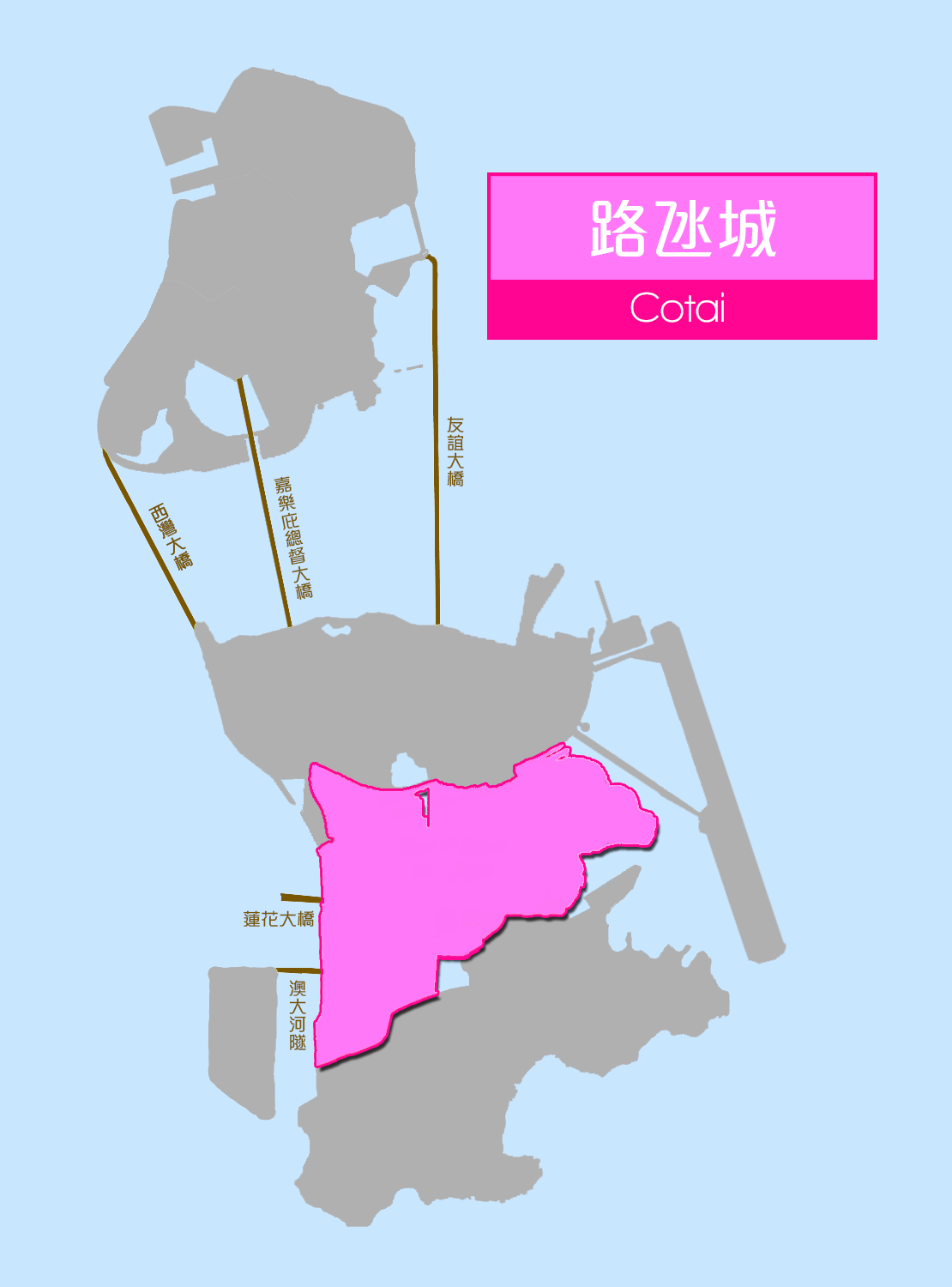
- Zona do Aterro de Cotai in Macau
- Country: China
- SAR: Macau

Area
  - Total: 5.8 km^{2} (2.2 sq mi)

Population (2016)
  - Total: 300
  - Density: 52/km^{2} (130/sq mi)
- Time zone: UTC+8 (Macau Standard)
- Area code: 0

Cotai Landfill Zone

Chinese name
- Traditional Chinese: 路氹填海區
- Simplified Chinese: 路凼填海区
- Jyutping: lou6 tam5 tin4 hoi2 keoi1
Transcriptions
Standard Mandarin
- Hanyu Pinyin: Lùdàng Tiánhǎi Qū
- IPA: [lûtâŋʈʂʰə̌ŋ xàɪtɕʰý]
Yue: Cantonese
- Yale Romanization: Louhtáhm Tìhnhói Kēui
- Jyutping: lou6 tam5 tin4 hoi2 keoi1
- IPA: [lɔw˨.tʰɐm˩˧ tʰin˩.hɔj˧˥ kʰɵɥ˥]

Alternative Chinese name
- Chinese: 路氹城
- Jyutping: lou6 tam5 sing4
Transcriptions
Standard Mandarin
- Hanyu Pinyin: Lùdàng Chéng
Yue: Cantonese
- Jyutping: lou6 tam5 sing4

Portuguese name
- Portuguese: Zona do Aterro de Cotai

Cotai (Chinese: 路氹城; Jyutping: lou6 tam5 sing4; Portuguese: Cotai) is a 5.2-square-kilometer (2.0 sq mi) piece of reclaimed land on the top of the Seac Pai Van between Taipa and Coloane islands in Macau that has connected two independent islands since 2005. The name, which is a portmanteau of Coloane and Taipa, can also refer to the island formed by the reclamation. In the second sense, the Special Administrative Region of Macau now consists of the Macau Peninsula, plus Cotai Island, about a mile to the south.

Cotai was created to provide Macau with a new gambling and tourism area, since Macau is so densely populated and land is scarce. Many hotels and casinos can now be found on the island. In 2006, a new hospital was founded in the Cotai area, the MUST Hospital, which is associated with the Macau University of Science and Technology Foundation.

== History ==
In 1968, a causeway (Estrada do Istmo) connecting Taipa and Coloane was inaugurated. Throughout the 1990s, a series of landfill works expanded this isthmus, and after the 1999 transfer of sovereignty over Macau from Portugal to China, further landfills began to expand this small isthmus further.

== Hotels and casinos ==
The "Cotai Strip" is a name designating the entire hotel-casino area, where the term "Cotai Strip" has been trademarked by Las Vegas Sands Corporation, which coined the phrase (USPTO Registration Nos. 4396486 and 4396486 for gambling and hotel services), and only applies to its properties.

Galaxy Entertainment Group's Grand Waldo Hotel was the first casino to commence operations in Cotai, opening in May 2006. The largest property on Cotai so far is Las Vegas Sands' The Venetian Macao, which opened on August 28, 2007. Melco PBL Holdings opened the City of Dreams directly across the street from the Venetian on June 1, 2009. The construction of additional casinos and hotel projects is currently underway.

== List of hotels and casinos ==
- Four Seasons Hotel Macao
- Broadway Macau
- City of Dreams
- Galaxy Macau
- Grand Lisboa Palace
- Lisboeta Macau
- MGM Cotai
- Pousada Marina Infante
- Studio City Macau
- The Londoner Macao
- The Parisian Macao
- The Plaza Macao
- The Venetian Macao
- Wynn Palace

== Tourist attractions ==
- Macau East Asian Games Dome

== East Landfill Zone ==
East of the Avenida do Aeroporto is a trapezoidal section of reclaimed land that is home to the city's only construction waste landfill, in use since 2006. In 2011, AECOM and the Macau government built a seawall to stabilize the landfill and stop the mud around it from encroaching on the Macau International Airport's piles.

The site is presently home to the transportation department's car inspection facility and driver's license exam center (opened in 2016) as well as the Macau Light Rapid Transit depot (opened in 2019). In 2024, the government announced plans to build the city's first waste recycling center in the area, completing it by 2027.

== Transportation ==
- Cotai Jet – high speed catamaran owned by The Venetian Macao, operating ferry services between Taipa Ferry Terminal and Hong Kong–Macau Ferry Terminal, Hong Kong
- Macau Light Rapid Transit - a mass transit system in Macau that began partial operations in 2019. Planned expansions will serve the Macau Peninsula, Taipa and Cotai, serving major border checkpoints such as the Border Gate, the Outer Harbor Ferry Terminal, the Lotus Bridge Border, and the Macau International Airport. The Ocean-to-Taipa-Ferry-Terminal line began operations in late 2019.

== Gallery ==
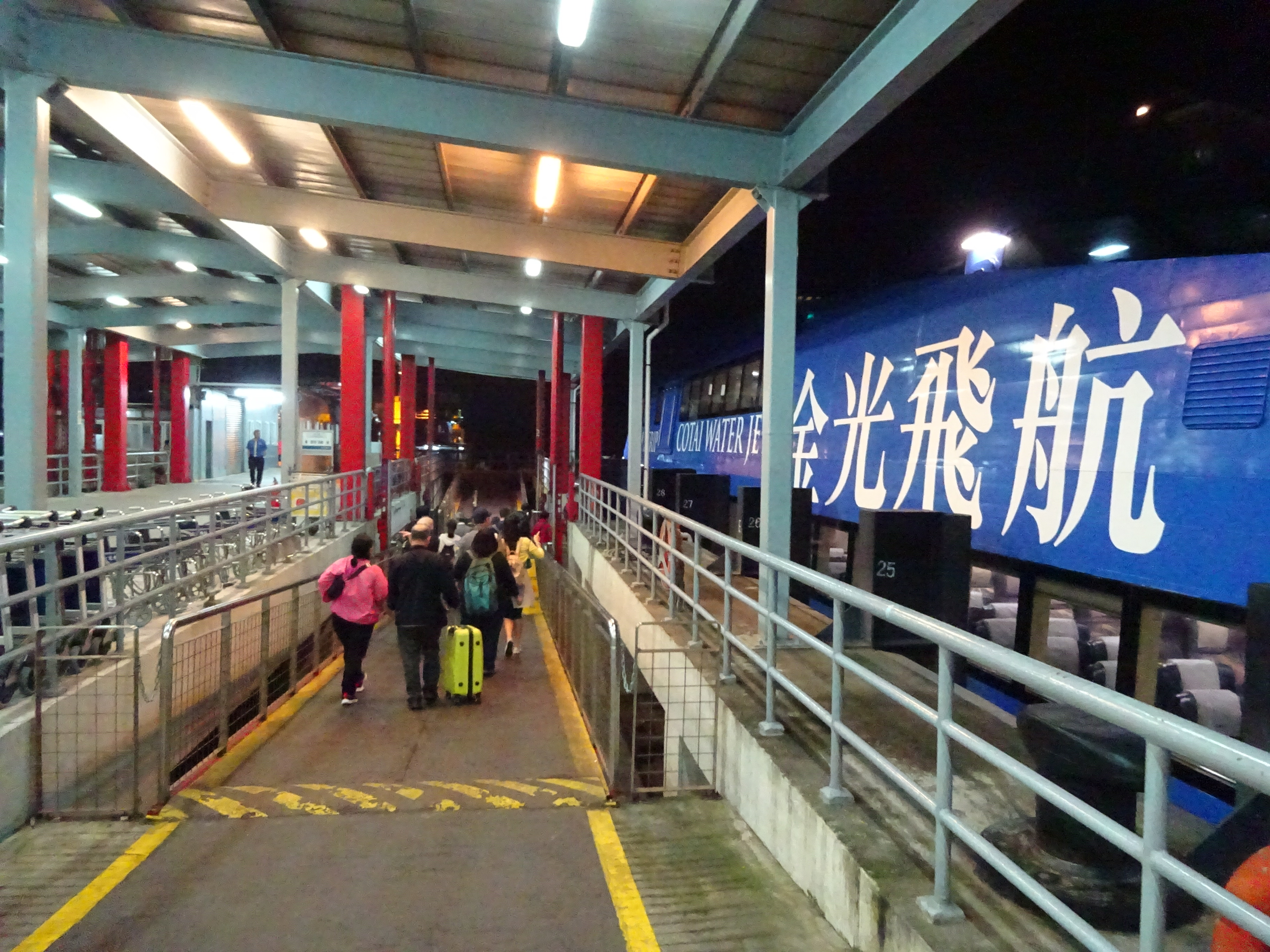
Ferry piers in Cotai

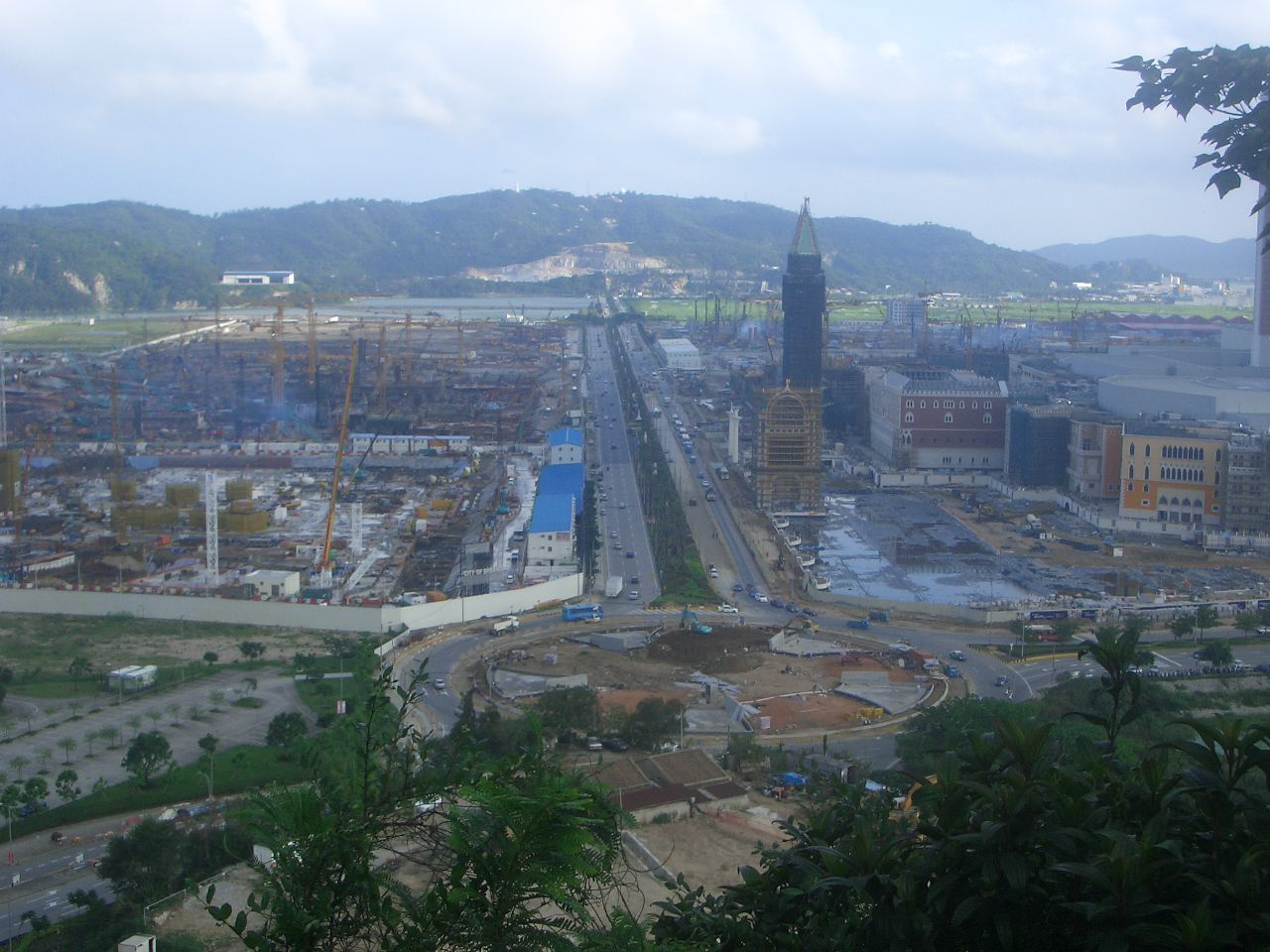
Cotai Strip under construction in 2007

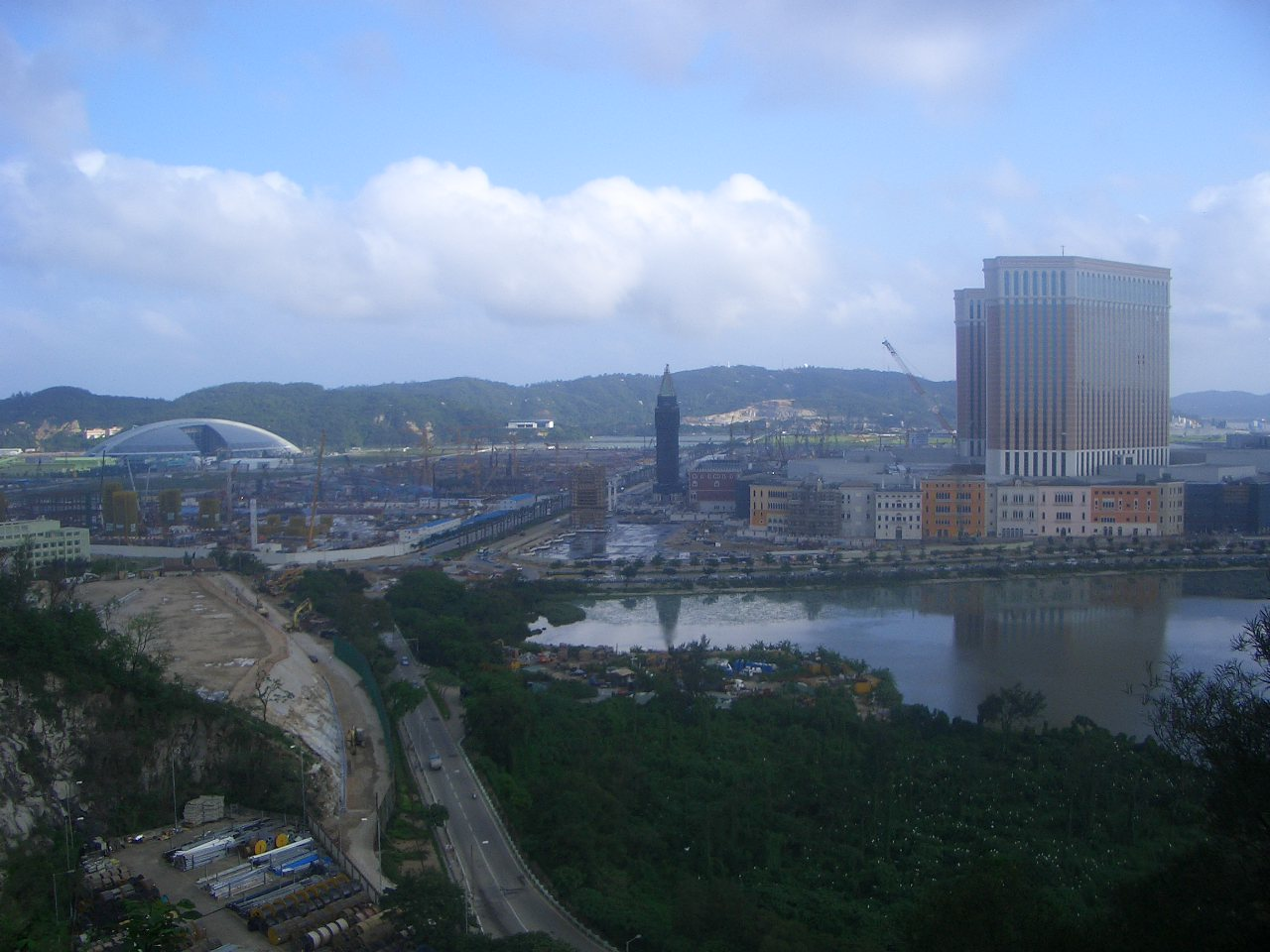
Cotai in 2007

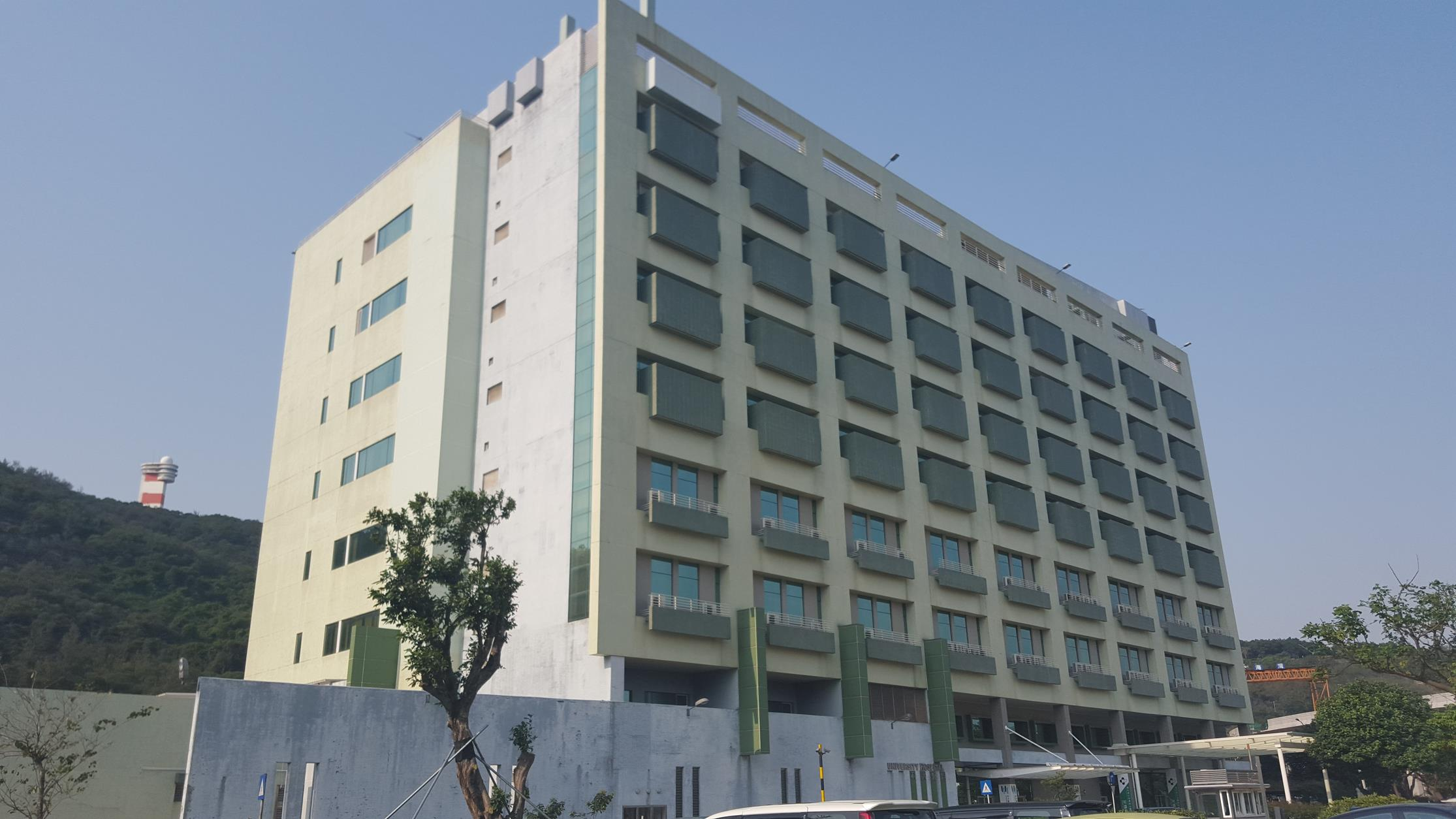
MUST Hospital

== See also ==
- Gambling in Macau
- One Oasis
