= L'Arc Macau =

Hotel and casino in Macau

- 澳門凱旋門 (Yue Chinese)

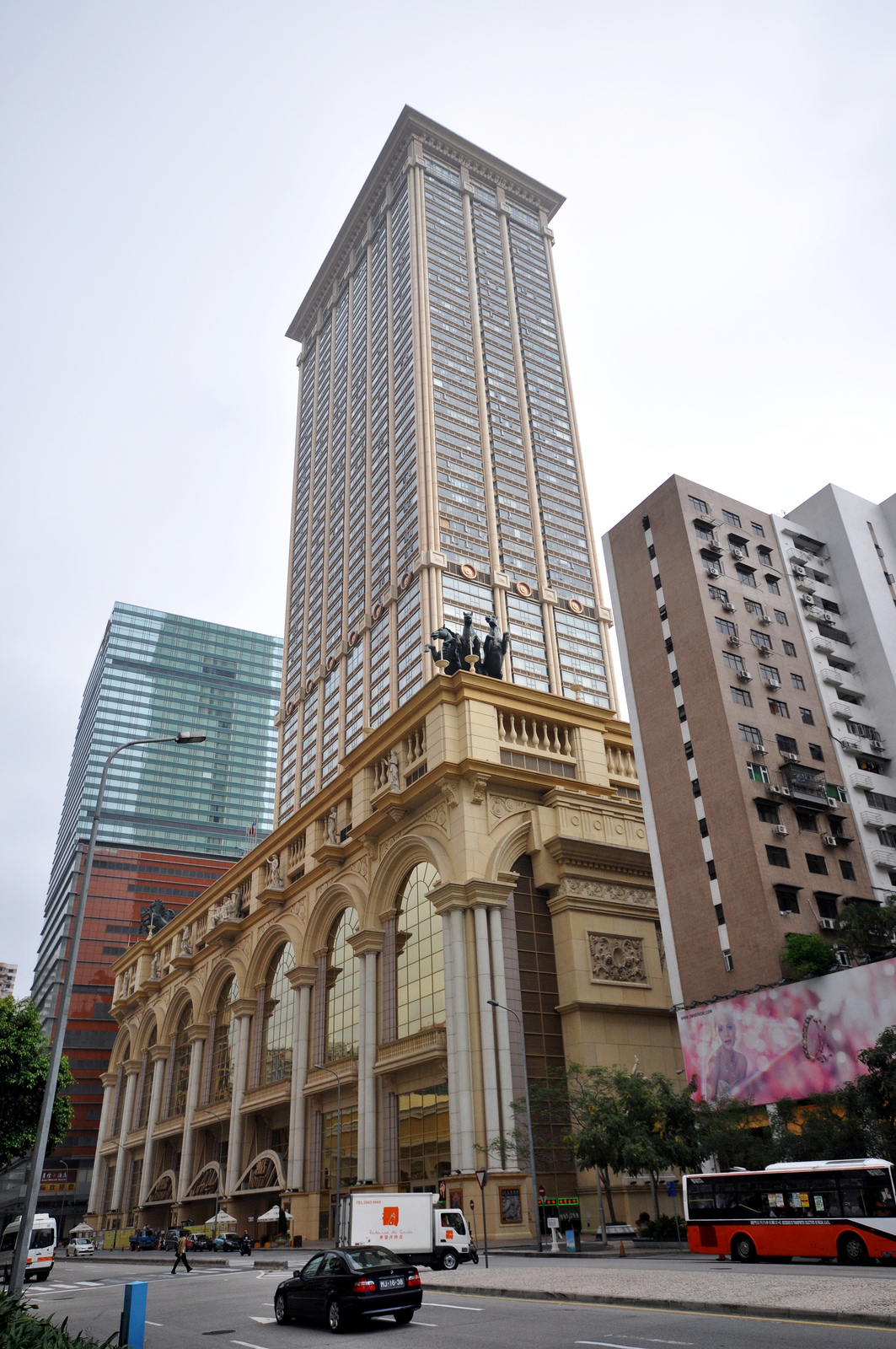
- L'Arc Macau in 2013
- Interactive map of L'Arc Macau
- Location: Avenida 24 de Junho, No.278, Sé, Macau, China; 22.2°N 113.5°E
- Opened: September 20th, 2009
- No. of rooms: 283
- Signature attractions: Kid's Adventure Land
- Casino type: Land-Based
- Operating license holder: SJM Holdings
- Website: www.larcmacau.com

The L'Arc Macau, L'Arc Casino or Le Royal Arc is a hotel and casino in Sé, Macau, China.

The casino and hotel has 53 floors, is 217-metre-tall (712 ft), and has 283 rooms, and is located across from the Wynn Hotel and Casino. The architecture is Portuguese-influenced, with a distinctively large pot of gold in its lobby.

== History ==
L'Arc Macau opened on 20 September 2009.

== See also ==
- Gambling in Macau
- List of tallest buildings in Macau
- Grand Lisboa
- Wynn Macau
- MGM Macau
