= Sociedade de Turismo e Diversões de Macau =

Public hospitality company in Macau

Sociedade de Turismo e Diversões de Macau, SA
- Type: Public
- Industry: Hospitality, Tourism
- Founded: 1962; 64 years ago
- Founder: Stanley Ho
- Headquarters: Macau
- Area served: Global
- Products: Gambling, Hotels, Entertainment, Casinos, Resorts
- Owner: Stanley Ho
- Website: www.sjmholdings.com/en

Sociedade de Turismo e Diversões de Macau, SA

Chinese name
- Traditional Chinese: 澳門旅遊娛樂股份有限公司
- Simplified Chinese: 澳门旅游娱乐股份有限公司
- Literal meaning: Tourism and Entertainment Company of Macau Limited
Transcriptions
Standard Mandarin
- Hanyu Pinyin: Àomén Lǚyóu Yúlè Gǔfènyǒuxiàngōngsī
Yue: Cantonese
- Jyutping: Ou^{3}mun^{4-2} Leoi^{5}jau^{4} Jyu^{4}lok^{6} Gu^{2}fan^{6-2}jau^{5}haan^{6}gung^{1}si^{1}

Portuguese name
- Portuguese: Sociedade de Turismo e Diversões de Macau, SA

The Sociedade de Turismo e Diversões de Macau, SA (STDM; Chinese: 澳門旅遊娛樂股份有限公司) is a company in Macau owned by the family of Stanley Ho. Historically, it held a monopoly to Macau's gambling industry as the only licensee for casinos. In 2002, the government of Macau began issuing more licenses and the monopoly was broken. Still, of the 41 operating casinos in Macau, 22 are owned by STDM, as of 2019.

== History ==
The company was founded in 1962 by Stanley Ho and his then partners Teddy Yip (Stanley Ho's brother-in-law through his sister, Susie Ho), Yip Hon and Henry Fok. In that year, it was granted a monopoly on gambling in Macau, which had previously been held by Tai Hing Company since 1934.

In 1982, Ho and Yip had a major public falling out, as a result of which Yip disposed of his 10% share in STDM for a rumored HK$400 million. Cheng Yu-tung, founder of New World Development, stepped in to fill the breach.

Fok's attempt to sell his stake in 1986, for a reported HK$600 million, was resisted by Ho. Complaining about the company's strategy and dividend policy, Fok gifted the stake to the Henry Fok Ying Tung Foundation in 2002.

Since 2002, STDM was the subject of numerous lawsuits initiated either by Ho or by his sister, Winnie. Only after the final challenge was resolved in 2008 was it able to list its casinos subsidiary Sociedade de Jogos de Macau (SJM) on the Hong Kong Stock Exchange.

In 2011, STDM shareholders are:

- Lanceford Company Limited: 31.6% (itself held 100% by Stanley Ho until the controversy of January 2011)
- Shun Tak Holdings: 11.5%
- Winnie Ho Yuen-ki: 7%
- Henry Fok Ying Tung Foundation: 27%
- Cheng Yu-tung 10%
- Others 12.9%

== Business activities ==
=== Gambling ===
Ho owns eight casinos, including Casino Lisboa, Macau's most famous casino. The casino features 107 slots and 146 table games. The property has six restaurants and a hotel with 1,000 rooms.

As casino gambling is illegal in Hong Kong, it is welcomed by tourists. Benefiting from the individual traveling policy between Hong Kong and Macau, the business of Casino Lisboa has increased rapidly, especially in the Chinese New Year. Within that period, the average daily income is HK$100 million. It is predicted that Lisboa will be required to pay HK$800 Million (US$103 Million) on betting duty.

In the 1960s, Ho owned nine casinos in the Philippines; however, Ho abandoned his Philippine business ventures due to conflict with the president.

Apart from casinos, football, horse race and dog race gambling are the other main income sources of Macau's gambling industry. Before football gambling betting rules were established in Hong Kong, football gambling in Macau was very popular among Hong Kong residents.

For many years, the gambling industry of Macau was solely owned by Ho's STDM. At one time Ho controlled up to 70% market share of Macau's gambling business. This era of monopoly came to an end in 2000.

In February 2000, the government of Macau proposed to split Macau's gambling operation into three parts. The casinos in Macau were still under STDM, but those in Coloane (路環) and Taipa (氹仔) were opened for bidding. At last, in 2002, other casino operators were able to obtain licenses for casinos in Coloane and Taipa. The arrival of the Sands Macau and other planned destination resorts, such as The Venetian Macao and the Wynn Macau and those along the Cotai Strip, a Las Vegas Strip-like development.

=== Aviation ===
A Hong Kong company owned by the family of Macau casino tycoon Stanley Ho invested up to a 30% stake in Air Macau's planned US$30 million low-cost airline in a press report.

Shun Tak Holdings has signed an agreement that the territory's flag carrier Air Macau and its parent China National Aviation Co will hold a majority stake in the airline, reported The Standard newspaper.

The carrier is expected to target the lucrative routes to China as well as the Asia Pacific region. Air Macau will transfer 22 routes to the venture and hold a 51 percent stake, and adding the budget airline will take over 11 Air Macau routes to China and 11 cities in the Philippines, South Korea and Vietnam.

STDM also have a business aviation arm, called Jet Asia, providing private jet services.

== Holdings ==
The STDM holds numerous buildings in the peninsula of Macau, as well as the outlying islands and in Portugal. The more notable ones include:

Macau:

- Grand Lisboa
- Hotel Lisboa
- Grand Lapa Macau
- Canidrome
- President Hotel
- Macau International Airport, 31% interest
- Macau Golf and Country Club
- Hotel Golden Dragon
- Greek Mythology Casino
- Pousada de Sao Tiago
- Hotel Fortuna
- Lisboa Palace
- Tiger Slots
- Grand Emperor Hotel
- Grandview (Taipa Island)
- Casa Real Hotel (Taipa Island)
- Jet Asia
- Grand Coloane Resort (formerly a Westin resort)
- New Yaohan Department Store
- Seng Heng Bank Limited (now Industrial and Commercial Bank of China (Macau))

Portugal:

- Casino Lisboa
- Casino Estoril
- Casino da Póvoa
- Hotel Sintra
- Hotel Fortaleza do Guincho

== See also ==
- List of companies of Macau
