= Casino Lisboa (Macau) =

Hotel casino in Macau, China

Coordinates: 22.189590°N 113.544039°E

Hotel Lisboa
- 葡京娛樂場 (Yue Chinese); Casino Lisboa (Portuguese)
- Hotel Lisboa Macau logo

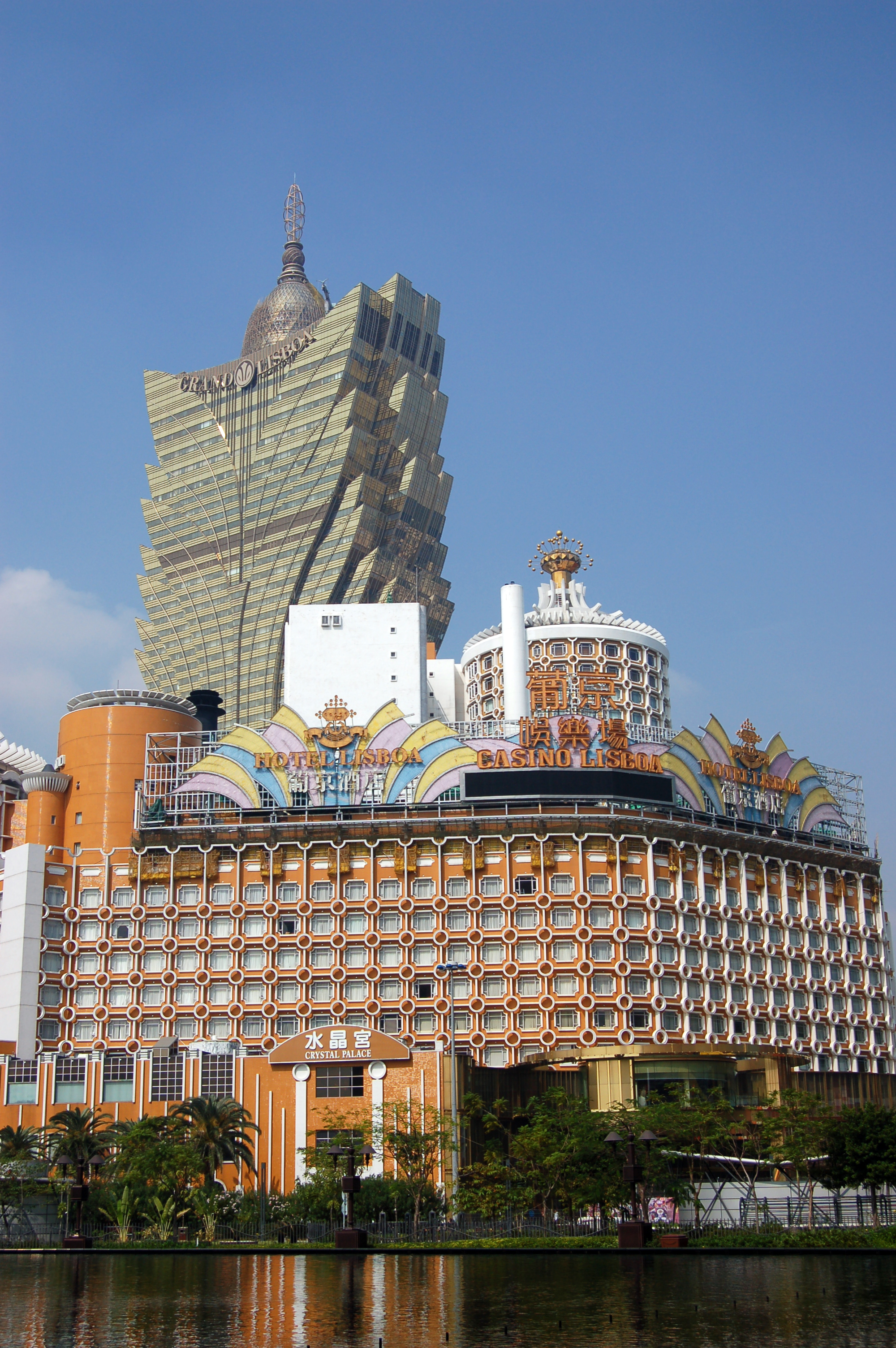
- Interactive map of Hotel Lisboa
- Location: Sé, Macau
- Opened: 1970
- No. of rooms: 2,362
- Operating license holder: SJM Holdings

Casino Lisboa

Chinese name
- Traditional Chinese: 葡京娛樂場
- Simplified Chinese: 葡京娱乐场
- Literal meaning: Portugal Capital Casino
Transcriptions
Standard Mandarin
- Hanyu Pinyin: Pú Jīng Yúlèchǎng
Yue: Cantonese
- Jyutping: pou4 ging1 jyu4 lok6 coeng4

Portuguese name
- Portuguese: Casino Lisboa

Casino Lisboa (lit. 'Lisbon Casino', Chinese: 葡京娛樂場) is an integrated resort located in Sé, Macau, operated by SJM Holdings. This three-storey complex was built in late 1960s.

The original casino and the 12-storey round hotel tower were built in 1970 by Stanley Ho, Teddy Yip, Yip Hon and Henry Fok. A 270-room extension was added in 1991 for a total of 927 rooms. In 2006, another extension, the Grand Lisboa, was built next to the current complex. Therefore, a total of 2,362 rooms are in place at Hotel Lisboa as of 2010. This expansion was partly done in competition with the then newly opened Wynn Macau, located right next to the original Casino Lisboa.

== Robuchon á Galera ==
Robuchon á Galera
- Interactive map of Robuchon á Galera

Restaurant information
- Established: 1 May 2001
- Food type: French
- Rating: Michelin Guide 2008
- Location: 3/F, Casino Lisboa, Macau, Macau, Macau, SAR China
- Reservations: Recommended

Robuchon á Galera, owned by the late chef Joël Robuchon, has been awarded three stars by the Michelin Guide in 2008. Robuchon á Galera serves European cuisine such as roasted guinea fowl and foie gras from its à la carte menu. The restaurant has since moved to the top floor of the Grand Lisboa hotel and has been renamed Robuchon au Dôme.

== Gallery ==
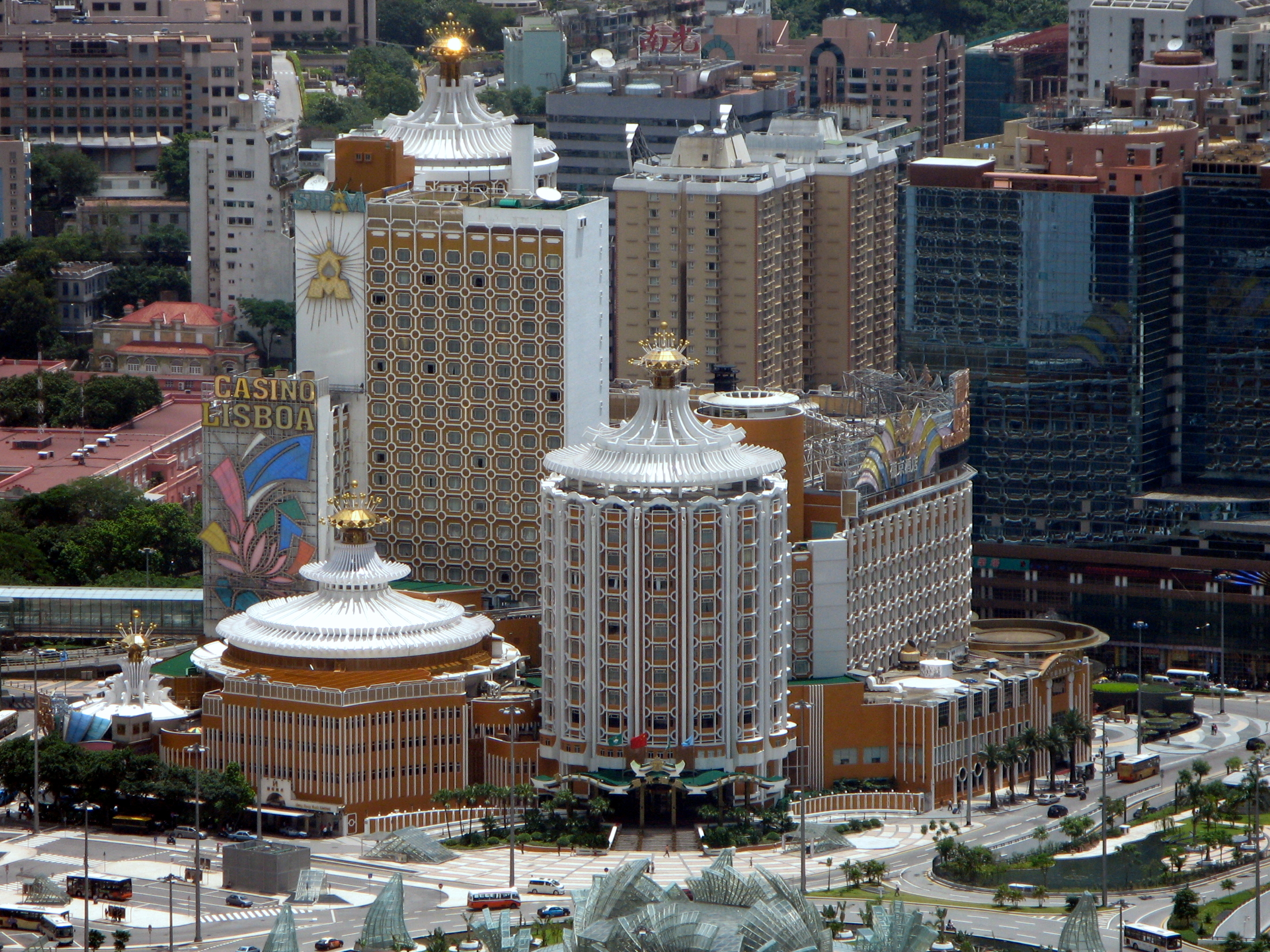
Casino Lisboa, Macau

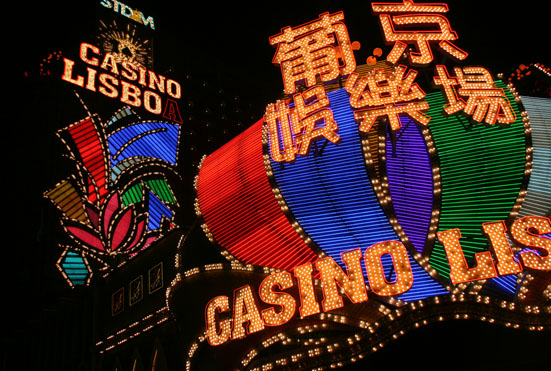
Casino entrance at night

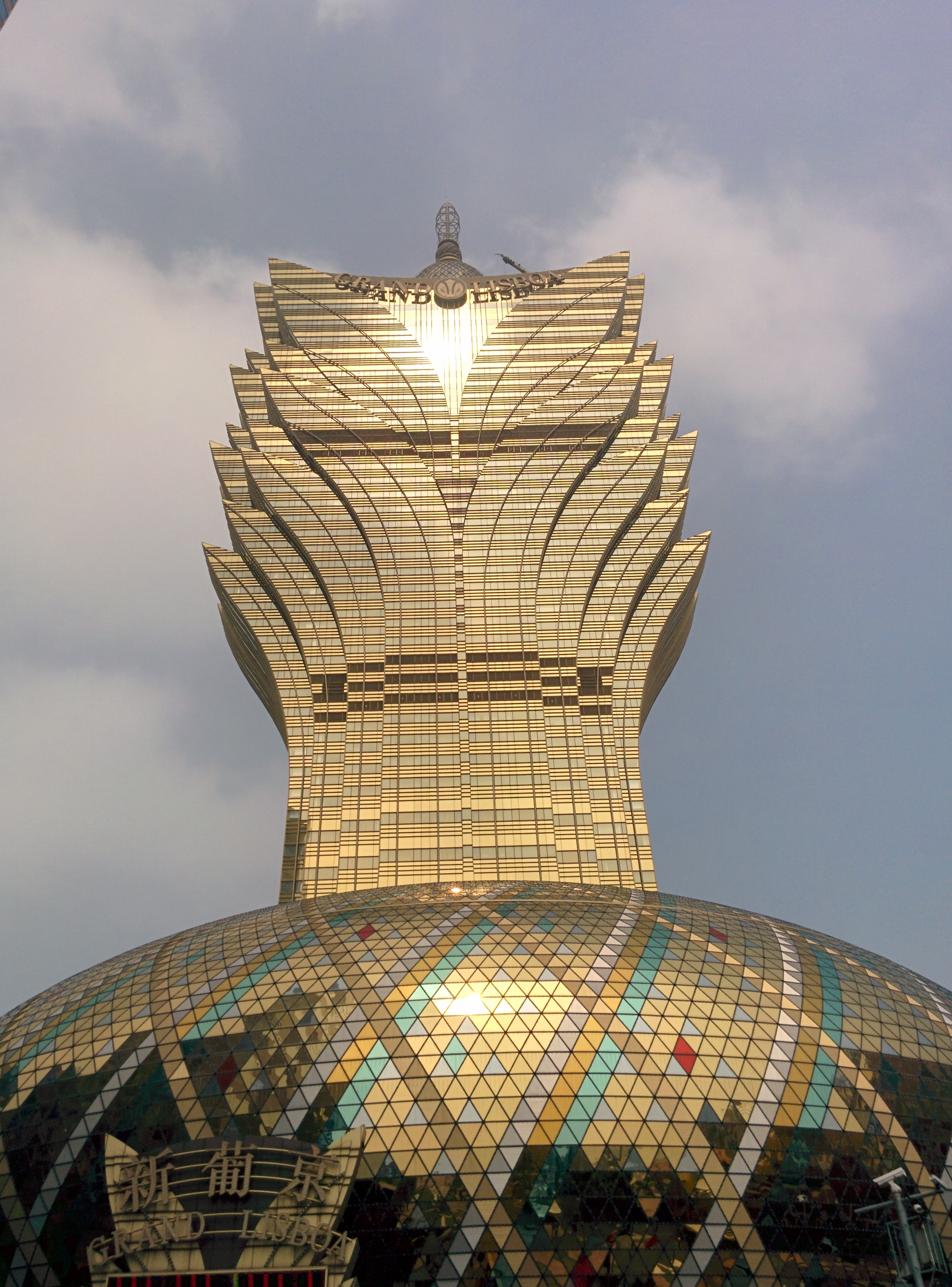
Macau - Grand Lisboa

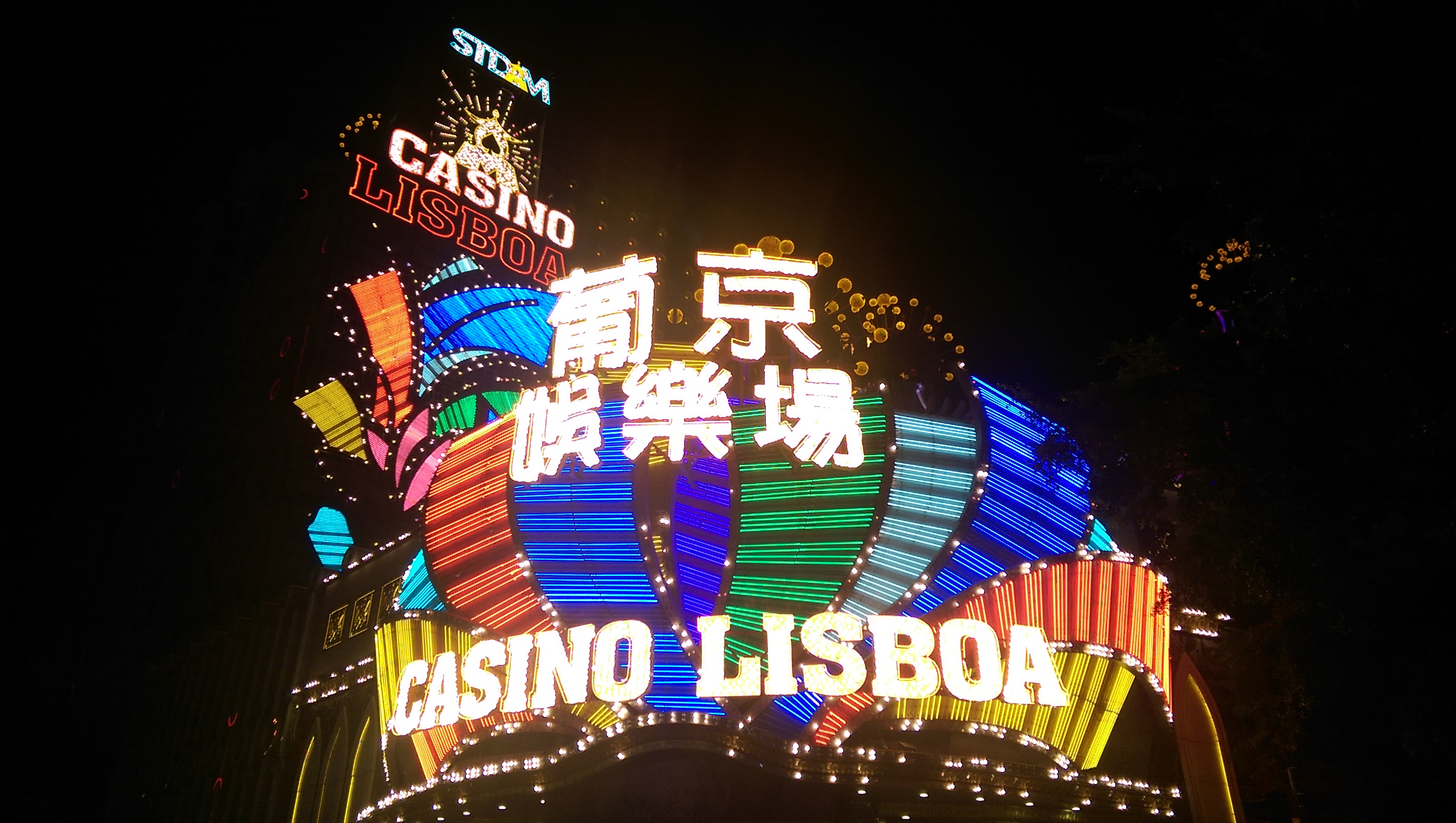

== See also ==
- List of Macau casinos
- Macau gaming law
- Gambling in Macau
- List of integrated resorts
