= Ponte 16 =

Coordinates: 22.19853°N 113.53688°E

- 十六浦 (Yue Chinese)

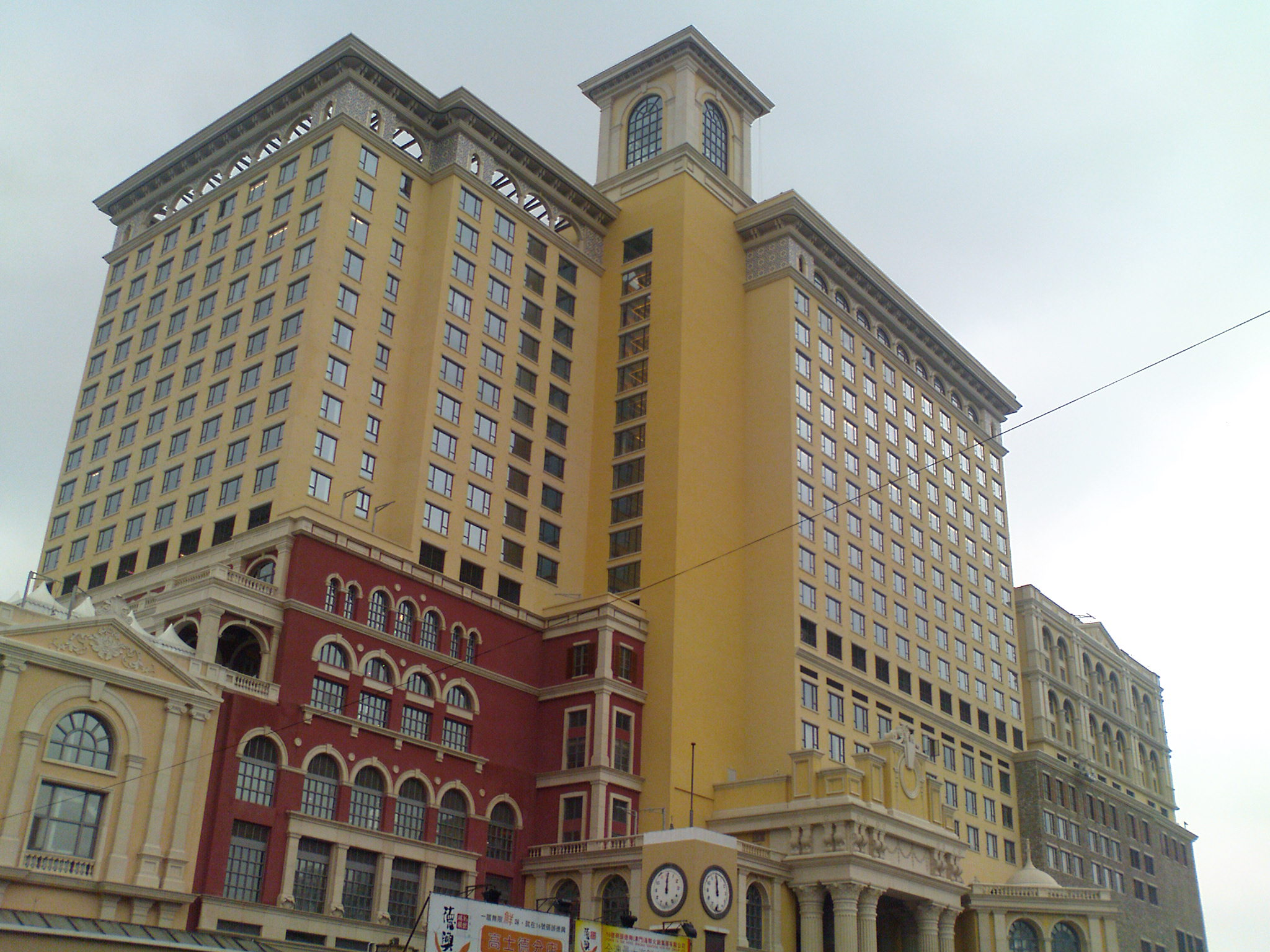
- Interactive map of Ponte 16
- Location: Santo António, Macau
- Opened: 1 February 2008
- Theme: French
- No. of rooms: 408
- Gaming space: 270,000 sq ft²
- Casino type: Land-Based
- Owner: SJM Holdings (51%), Macau Success Limited (49%)
- Operating license holder: SJM Holdings
- Renovated in: none
- Website: ponte16.com.mo

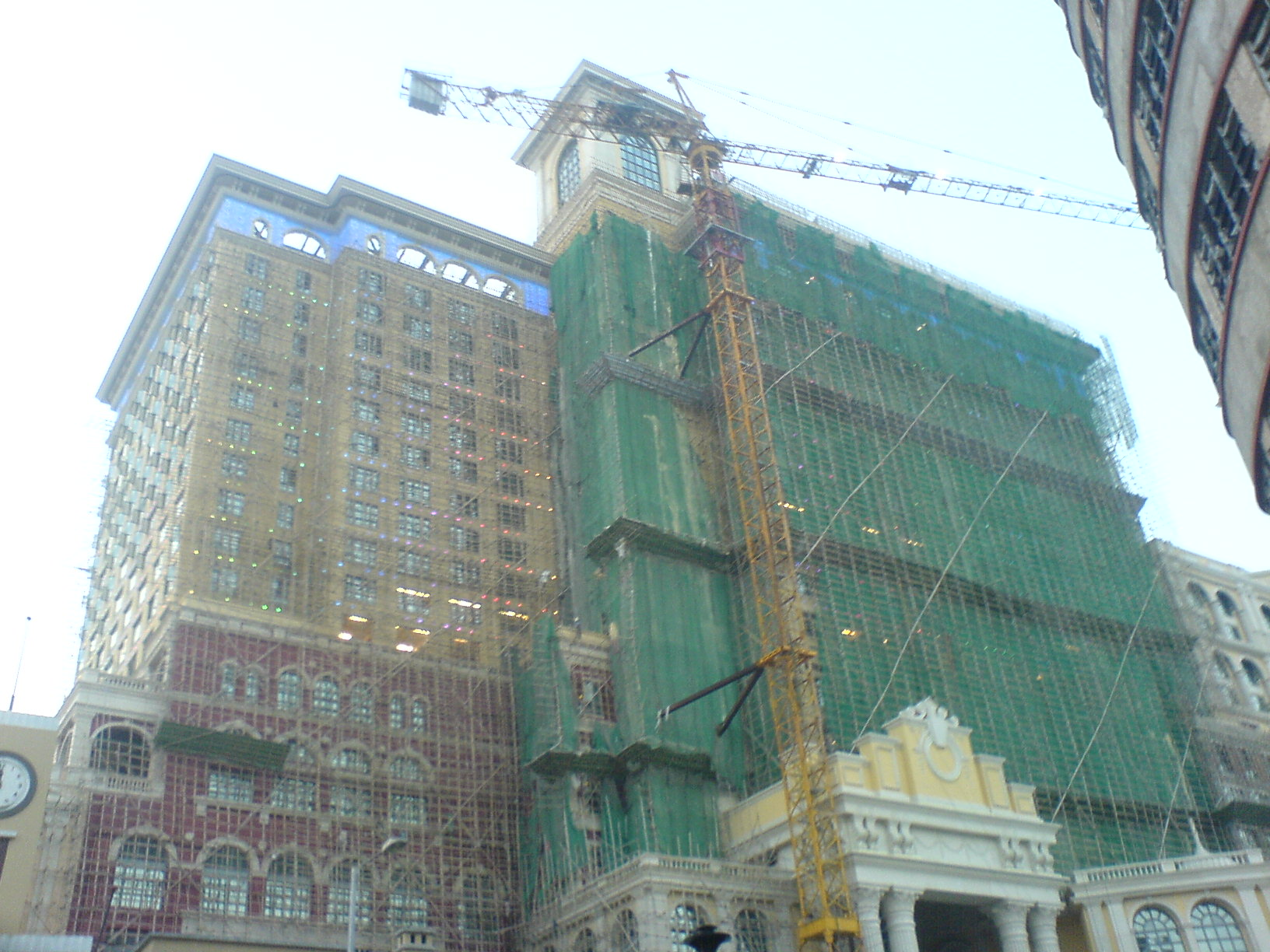
Ponte 16 being built

Ponte 16 Resort Macau (Chinese: 十六浦) is located in Santo António, Macau, is a hotel and casino resort co-developed by SJM Investment Limited, a wholly owned subsidiary of Sociedade de Jogos de Macau (in turn, a subsidiary of Sociedade de Turismo e Diversões de Macau), which owns 51% of the project, and Macau Success Limited which owns 49% of the project. The resort opened on 1 February 2008.

== History ==
Ponte 16 was the first fisherman's port, resplendent in the colonial architecture of the day, a hub of diverse cultural influences. In the mid 1900s, Chinese triads and gangs moved in and the area became known for gambling. The Inner Harbor reigned as the city's economic center up until the 1970s, when commercial activities began to decline with the relocation of the Hong Kong - Macau Ferry Terminal.

== Location ==
Ponte 16 takes it place at the center of the Inner Harbor on the west side of Macau, right at the waters edge. This development is easily accessible by all modes of transportation.

== Features ==
=== Hotel ===
Accor has teamed with Pier 16 - Property Development Limited to bring the "Sofitel Macau At Ponte 16" to Macau. As planned the 20-storey hotel will offer 408 rooms, restaurants and bars, swimming pools, gym, wellness center and business center with multi-function conference room.

=== Casino ===
The casino will offer a selection of gaming machines, gaming tables and endless amusement in an estimated area of 270,000 sq ft (25,000 m^{2}).

=== Shows ===
Shows are staged there including international groups from South Africa, Taiwan and more. In 2009 a South African group performed a lovely show with performers like singer Monique Magerstein, who praised the Ponte 16 and Macau after performing there.

=== Exhibits ===
There are numerous Michael Jackson items on exhibition in Ponte 16, including the glove he wore when he first performed his moonwalk on television. Jackson's glove was sold to the casino at New York's Julien's Auctions at a price of US$350,000, eight times the auctioneer's minimum estimated price.

=== Restaurants and buffets ===
- Le Mistral Buffet is a large buffet with Japanese, French, Chinese and Swiss dishes

=== Bars ===
- Le Rendezvous
- Pool Bar

== See also ==
- Gambling in Macau
- List of integrated resorts
