= SJM Holdings Limited =

Company based in Macau

- Native name: 澳門博彩控股有限公司
- Type: Public
- Traded as: SEHK: 880
- Industry: Hospitality, tourism, gambling
- Headquarters: Macau
- Area served: Macau
- Key people: Dr. Stanley Ho
- Products: Gambling, Hotels, Entertainment, Casinos, Resorts
- Website: www.sjmholdings.com

Sociedade de Jogos de Macau is a Macau based company. The company owns, operates and develops casinos and integrated entertainment resorts in Macau. It is a majority-owned subsidiary of Sociedade de Turismo e Diversões de Macau (STDM) and it is listed as SJM Holdings Limited (HKEx: 880) on the Hong Kong Stock Exchange.

== History ==
The retirement of Stanley Ho from his positions as chairman and executive director was announced in April 2018. He was succeeded by his daughter Daisy Ho.

On February 8, 2002, SJM Holdings Limited, Galaxy Entertainment Group Limited, and Wynn Resorts (Macau) Limited won the Macau gaming franchise, operating 19 casinos and 6 independent slot machines in Macau. In 2004, SJM Holdings Limited's net profit was MOP 34.2 billion. On February 17, 2006, SJM Holdings Limited established a new company, SJM Holdings Limited, in Hong Kong and made full preparations for its listing on the Hong Kong Stock Exchange. On July 7, 2008, Ms. Ho Wan-ki, known as "Ten Sisters," filed for judicial review in the Hong Kong High Court, attempting to prevent SJM Holdings Limited from listing in Hong Kong on July 10, but ultimately failed, and SJM Holdings Limited successfully listed in Hong Kong.

On August 30, 2012, SJM Holdings acquired a 4% stake in Macau Legend Development Limited for HK$480 million. Legend Development Limited has since merged with Macau Fisherman's Wharf International Investment Ltd. (“Fisherman's Wharf”). Zhou Jinhui stated that he currently holds 35.2% of the company's shares, his mother Lin Feng'e holds 26.2%, Li Zhiqiang, chairman of the Macau Jockey Club, holds 19%, and Stanley Ho's third wife, Chen Wanzhen, holds 18.2%. The remaining 1.4% is held by several minority shareholders.

In June 2018, Pansy Ho was appointed as the Chairman of SJM Holdings Limited, and in July 2018, she was appointed as the Chairman of the Executive Committee of the Board of Directors. In February 2019, she was appointed as a member of the Nomination Committee and the Remuneration Committee of the Board of Directors. Subsequently, in June 2019, she was transferred from her original position as a member of the Nomination Committee of the Board of Directors to become the Chairman of SJM Holdings Limited. In March 2019, Pansy Ho was elected as a director of SJM Holdings Limited and appointed as the Chairman of the Board of Directors of SJM Holdings Limited.

On June 23, 2021, its subsidiary, "SJM Resorts, Inc.", was renamed "SJM Resorts, Inc." (abbreviated as " SJM Resorts "), with the Portuguese name changed to SJM RESORTS, SA and the English name changed to SJM RESORTS, LIMITED.

== Ownership ==
According to the 2024 Annual report of SJM Holdings Limited, 61.91% of the issued shares were held by Sociedade de Turismo e Diversões de Macau (STDM), while 8.09% were held by Leong On Kei. The STDM ownership was reportedly 54% in 2019.

== Operations ==
Hotels and casinos operated by SJM Holdings Limited include:

Casinos

- Casino Casa Real
- Casino Emperor Palace
- Casino Fortuna
- Casino Grand Lisboa Palace
- Casino Grand Lisboa
- Casino Grandview
- Casino Kam Pek Paradise
- Casino L'Arc Macau
- Casino Landmark
- Casino Legend Palace
- Casino Lisboa
- Casino Oceanus at Jai Alai
- Casino Ponte 16

Hotels

- Grand Lisboa Palace Resort
- Grand Lisboa Hotel
- Jai Alai Hotel
- Sofitel Macau at Ponte 16

== See also ==
- Gambling in Macau
- List of companies listed on the Hong Kong Stock Exchange
- Macau Open
