= Gambling in Macau =

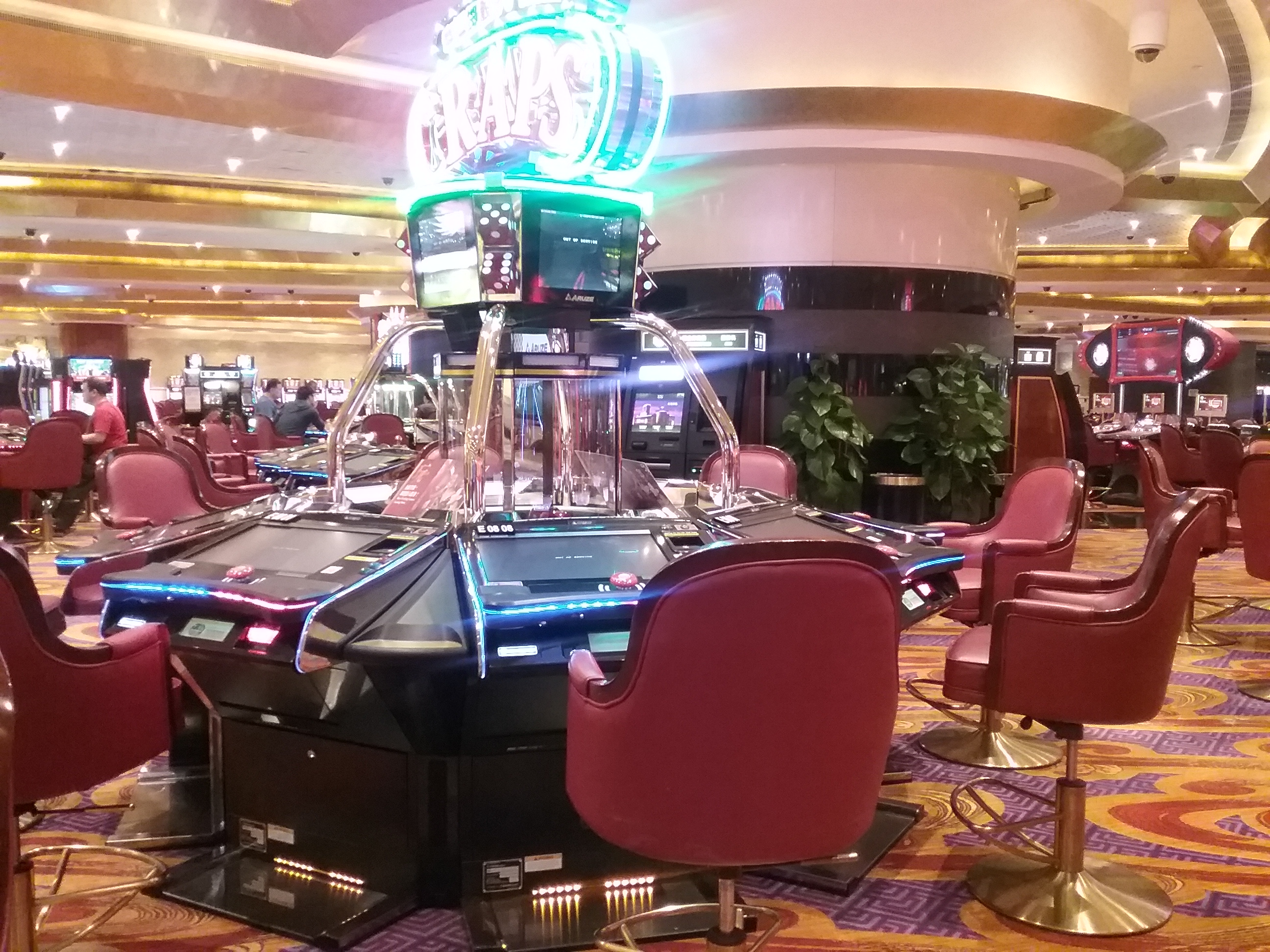
Digital craps tables at the Sands Macao casino

Macau, a special administrative region of China, is the only place in China where casinos are legal. Gambling has been legal since the 1850s when the Portuguese government legalised the activity in the autonomous colony. After the handover of Macau from Portugal to China, Macau and the business has grown at a high pace since 2001, when the government ended the four-decade gambling monopoly of the Hong Kong billionaire Stanley Ho. With the entry of large foreign casinos from Las Vegas and Australia, Macau overtook the Las Vegas Strip in gambling revenues in 2007. Since then, Macau has become known worldwide as the "gambling capital of the world", grossing the highest amount of gambling/gaming revenue and greatly dwarfing all the other gambling centres/cities.

Gambling tourism is Macau's biggest source of revenue, making up about 50% of the economy, and gaming taxes making up 75% of Macau's government revenue. Visitors are largely from mainland China and Hong Kong.

== History ==
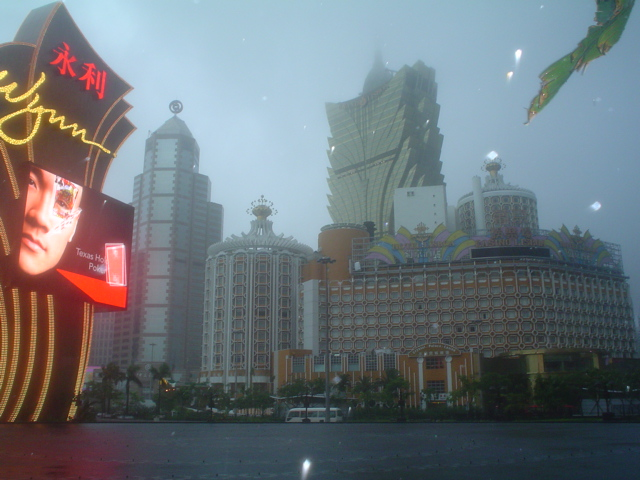
Casinos in Macau

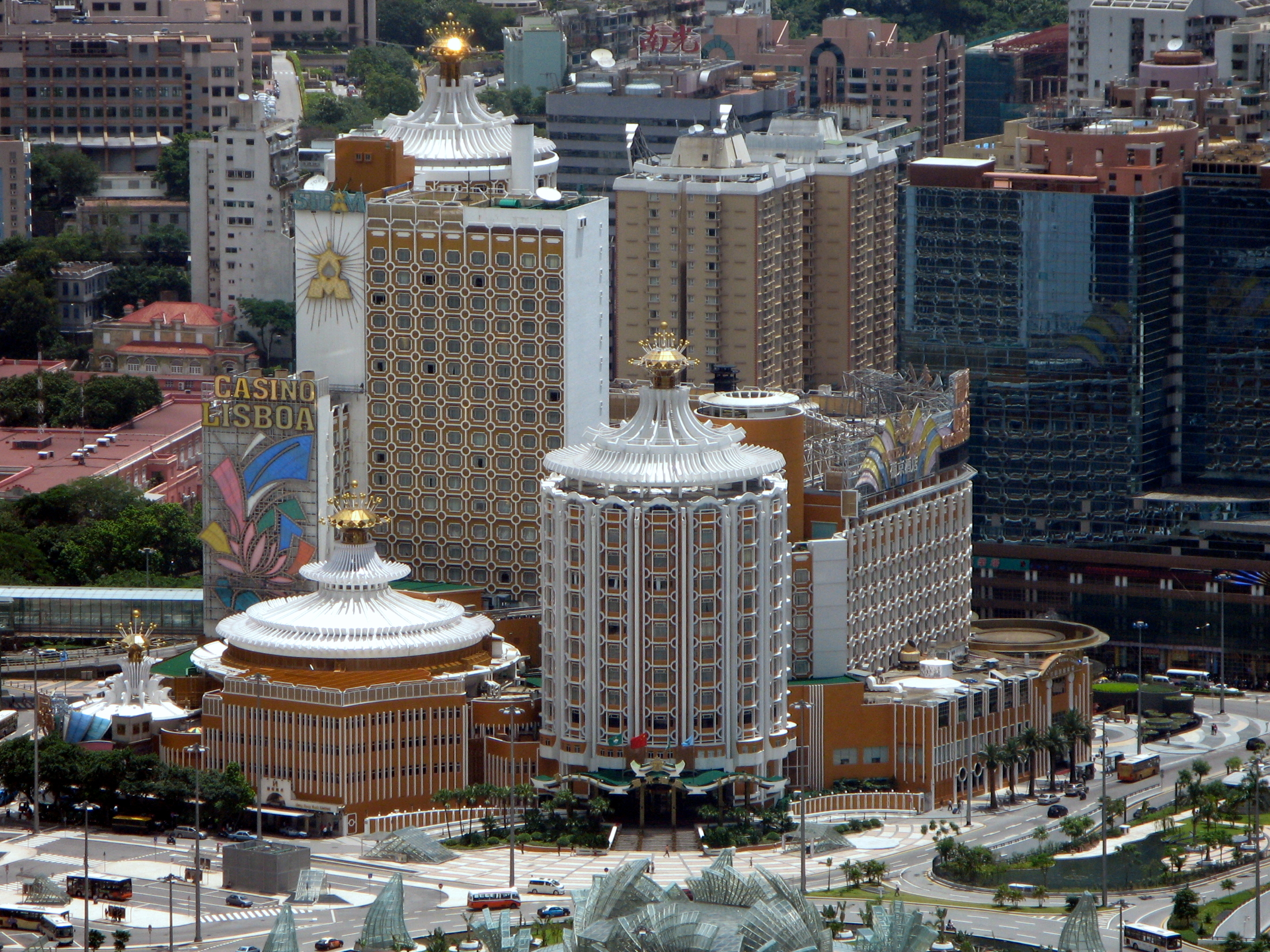
Casino Lisboa

In an attempt to generate revenues for the government, gambling in Macau was legalized by the Portuguese government in 1849. In the late 19th century, the government introduced a licensing system for the fantan houses (Chinese gambling houses). It is reported that over 200 gambling houses were required to pay gambling rent to the government. The second casino monopoly concession was granted to the Tai Heng Company in 1937. The company was, however, too conservative to fully exploit the economic potential of gambling.

The industry saw a major breakthrough in 1962 when the government granted the monopoly rights to all forms of gambling to Sociedade de Turismo e Diversões de Macau (STDM), run by Stanley Ho. The STDM introduced Western-style games and modernised the marine transport between Macau and Hong Kong, bringing millions of gamblers from Hong Kong every year. The license was extended in 1986 for another 15 years but expired at the end of 2001.

Over a three year period in the late 1990s, as wave of gang violence referred to as the casino wars occurred disrupted Macau's casino industry. The casino wars were largely attributable to rival Triad groups who sought to gain control of Macau's illicit industries before Portugal transferred the territory back to China. The Portuguese authorities of Macau mostly failed to address the violence, which resulted in 122 deaths, or to catch those responsible.

Macau was transferred to the People's Republic of China in 1999 and became a special administrative region of China. During this transition, there were no changes to gambling policy in Macau.

In 2002, the Macau government ended the monopoly system and granted three (later six) casino operating concessions (and subconcessions) to: Sociedade de Jogos de Macau (SJM, an 80% owned subsidiary of STDM), Wynn Resorts, Las Vegas Sands, Galaxy Entertainment Group, the partnership of MGM Mirage and Pansy Ho Chiu-king, and the partnership of Melco and PBL. On 18 May 2004, the Sands Macau casino opened near the Macau Ferry Terminal. Today, there are 16 casinos operated by the STDM, and they are still crucial in the casino industry in Macau.

== Economic aspects ==
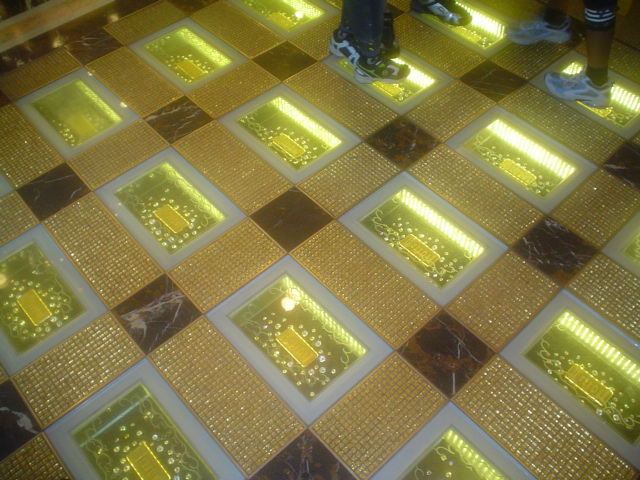
Gold Bars at the Emperor Casino in Macau

Macau's economy relies heavily on gambling. Nowadays, the gambling industry generates over 40% of the GDP of Macau. Since the early 1960s, around 50% of Macau's official revenue has been driven by gambling. The percentage remained steady until the late 1990s. In 1998, 44.5% of total government revenue was produced by the direct tax on gambling. Then there was a 9.1% decrease in 1999, probably due to internet gaming. After the handover of Macau from Portugal to China, the SAR released gambling licenses to other companies to eliminate the monopoly played by the STDM. In 2002, the government signed concession contracts with two Macau gaming companies, Wynn Resort Ltd. and Galaxy Casino. This opened the gambling market for competition and increased government tax revenue significantly. It also attracted more tourists to Macau.

As of at least 2015, 90% of tourist revenue in Macau is derived from gambling.

However, the gambling industry is also a source of instability in the Macau economy, as the nature of the gambling business is not susceptible to technological advancement or productivity growth. The gambling business is still dependent on the prosperity of other Asian economies, especially that of China. Due to Xi Jinping's promise on cracking down of corruption across mainland China, casino profits from across Macau have been reporting a decline in monthly profits In addition, a proliferation of other gambling venues in the region is drawing the target demographic away. Macau's 2018 grew 13% over the prior year, but this lagged behind the 41% growth in emerging casino markets in Singapore, South Korea, the Philippines and Australia, according to Fitch Ratings. In 2019 casino earnings reached their lowest level in three years.

In 2020 Macau had a decline of 56 percent in revenue, and the number of monthly visitors fell from approximately 3 million before the COVID-19 pandemic to fewer than 1 million in 2021. The unemployment rate increased from an average of 2 percent over the past decade to 4.6 percent in the first quarter of 2022. In August 2025, Macau casinos set a post-COVID record of $2.76 billion – the highest number since January 2020.

Taxes from gambling revenues fund a robust welfare system and an annual cash payment to Macau's citizens.

== Gambling forms ==
=== Casinos ===
Macau has 41 casinos (as of 2019), of which the biggest is The Venetian Macao. Twenty-four casinos are located on the Macau Peninsula and 17 in Cotai. They all operate under a government franchise and under a common set of rules. The main casino operators in Macau are SJM Holdings, Galaxy Entertainment Group and Las Vegas Sands with respective revenues of 9.7, 4.8, and 4.2 billion in 2011.

A form of VIP contractual system called the junket trade operates in Macau. Junket agents recruit high rollers to Macau and advance the high rollers credit for gambling. The practice developed in the 1980s, when Stanley Ho began subcontracting private gambling rooms in his casinos to independent agents.

A wide range of games are available, including roulette, blackjack, baccarat, boule, Sic bo, Fan Tan, keno and slot machines. Chinese gamblers generally prefer table games, the most popular of which is baccarat. Only approximately 5% of annual gaming revenues come from slot machines.

The punto banco version of baccarat is most common and, because it is purely a game of chance, offers the best odds of any table game in Macau's casinos. Baccarat is the sole game played in Macau's VIP rooms. Taxes derived from baccarat are the single largest source of public revenue in Macau.

Common conventions among baccarat players in Macau include chanting, blowing on cards, banging the table, and "squeezing" the cards. "Squeezing" the cards refers to folding over the sides and corners to slowly reveal the points value of the cards, rather than simply flipping them over. Although punto banco baccarat is a pure game of chance on which no rational bet can be made, many gamblers record the succession of Player or Banker wins in an effort to discern patterns. Gamblers typically do so on a chart called the Big Road on which Player and Banker wins can be recorded so that streaks can be readily observed. The popularity of tracking such results among gamblers in Macau has led to the practice being used at casinos throughout the world where Chinese people gamble.

Poker was introduced only in August 2007, in an electronic table format at Galaxy Starworld casino. The first live poker tournament was the Asia Pacific Poker Tour Macau event in November 2007. Shortly thereafter, in January 2008, the government of Macau published the official rules for Texas hold 'em poker games in Macau. In February 2008, Grand Lisboa Casino added the first live-dealer cash game tables. In May 2008, 'PokerStars Macau' opened at Grand Waldo Casino. In November 2008, Texas Holdem' Poker opened at Wynn Macau. 'PokerStars Macau' moved to a new location at the Grand Lisboa Casino in March 2009. Today, Wynn Macau, StarWorld, and the Venetian offer live-dealer cash game poker tables.

Over the opposition of the casino industry, Macau implemented smoking prohibitions in casinos in October 2014. At the start of 2019, the restrictions were extended to Casino VIP rooms. These changes were largely motivated by the concerns of croupiers, who spoke out against their unhealthy work environments.

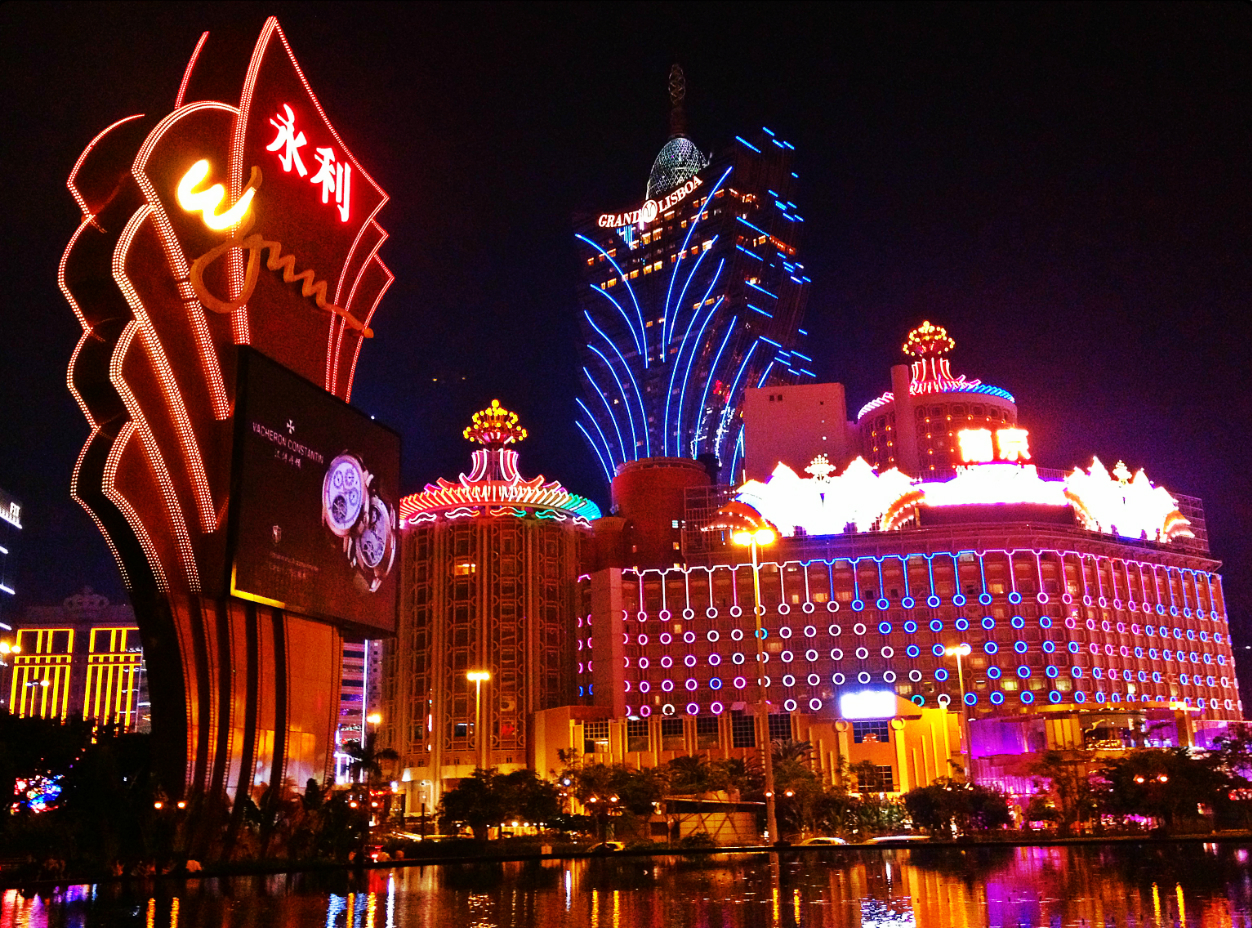
Casino Lights in Macau

List of Casinos in Macau
Name	Opening Hours	Size	Special Features
Casino Lisboa	24 hours	107 slots and 146 table games (190,000 sq ft)	Hotel with 1,000 rooms and 6 restaurants
Casa Real Casino	24 hours	123 slots and 53 table games (36,000 sq ft)	Hotel with 381 rooms and 2 restaurants
Grandview Casino	24 hours	51 table games	Hotel with 407 rooms and 2 restaurants
Casino Macau Palace	24 hours	51 slots and 12 table games (11,120 sq ft)	None
Altira Macau	24 hours	550 slots and 220 table games	Hotel with 216 VIP rooms
Jai Alai Casino	24 hours	208 slots and 61+ table games, 4 VIP rooms (67,075 sq ft)	None
Kam Pek Casino	24 hours	71 slots and 24 table games; 4 VIP rooms (34,320 sq ft)	None
Kingsway Hotel & Casino	12:00 – 04:00	20 slots and 8 table games (11,755 sq ft)	Hotel with 410 rooms
Grand Lapa Macau	12:00 – 04:00	59 slots and 11 table games (12,140 sq ft)	Hotel with 437 rooms and 6 restaurants
Mocha Clubs	24 hours	1000 slots (number of tables unknown)	None
New Century Hotel & Casino	24 hours	19 table games	Hotel with 554 rooms
The Legend Club	24 hours	108 slots and 12 table games; 1 VIP room (15,000 sq ft)	None
Sands Macao	24 hours	405 slots and 270 gaming tables (165,000 sq ft)	51 suite VIP hotel
Golden Dragon Casino	24 hours	137 slots, 123 gaming machines and 85 gaming tables, 15 VIP rooms	483 deluxe guest rooms including 84 harbour view rooms and 45 signature suites
Greek Mythology Casino	24 hours	228 tables (to be upgraded to 500), 100 slot machines (160,000 sq ft)	554 rooms at the New Century Hotel
MGM Macau	24 hours	345 gaming tables and 1035 slot machines	600-room hotel
Wynn Macau	24 hours	375 slot machines and 212 gaming tables (246,000 sq ft)	Integrated resort with 600 rooms and restaurants
The Venetian Macao, Cotai Strip	24 hours	3400 slot machines and 800 gaming tables (550,000 square feet of casino space)	Integrated resort with 3000 suites, convention and retail space
Babylon Casino – Fisherman's Wharf	11:00 – 23:00		
Casino Crystal Palace at Hotel Lisboa		36 tables (14,100 sq ft)	Makccarat tables
Diamond Casino at Holiday Inn		6 + 1 VIP Room, 32 slot machines (6,900 sq ft)	
Emperor Palace Casino		64 gaming table on 3 floors of casino concourse & 8 VIP Halls, 365 slot machines	
Fortuna Casino	24 hours	35 gaming tables	
Galaxy Rio Casino		80 tables, 150 slots, 4 VIP rooms	450 rooms, 65 suites
Galaxy Starworld	24 Hours	300 tables, 371 slots	StarWorld Hotel
Galaxy Waldo Hotel and Casino	24 Hours	63 tables, 8 VIP rooms, 100 slots	161 rooms
Pharaoh's Palace Casino	24 Hours	109 tables 5 VIP rooms, 383 slots (9000 sq ft)	3 Presidential suites, 448 Rooms and Suites at The Landmark
Ponte 16	24 Hours	150 tables, 5 VIP halls and 20 rooms	
Casino Marina at Taipa		20 tables, 4 VIP rooms, 37 slots 45,900	312 rooms and suites at Marina Hotel
Crown Casino, Taipa – u/c		220 (80 VIP), 183,000 sq ft (17,000 m^{2}) gaming space 500 slots	
MJC Casino, Taipa		19 tables, 2 VIP rooms, 15,800 sq ft (1,470 m^{2})	3 Deluxe Rooms and 22 Junior Suites and 1 Presidential Suite and 352 Standard Rooms and 26 Suites
City of Dreams	24 Hours	420,000-square-foot (39,000 m^{2}) gaming floor containing 550 gaming tables and 1500 machines; 85,000 square feet (7,900 m^{2}) of retail space; Theatre of Dreams (1,700 seaters)	366-room Hard Rock Hotel and 290 suites Crown Towers Hotel, Cotai. Grand Hyatt Macau (971 rooms).
Galaxy Cotai Mega Resort, Cotai		450 tables, 1000 slot	2000 hotel rooms, 50 restaurants, an artificial beach, a wave pool
Galaxy Grand Waldo, Cotai		168 tables, 25 machines, 350 slots (120000 sq ft)	
Casino Oceanus	24 hours	32,000 m2 on 3 floors containing 269 gaming tables and 569 machines	special facade, closest casino to the ferry terminal directly connected by a pedestrian bridge

=== Horse racing ===
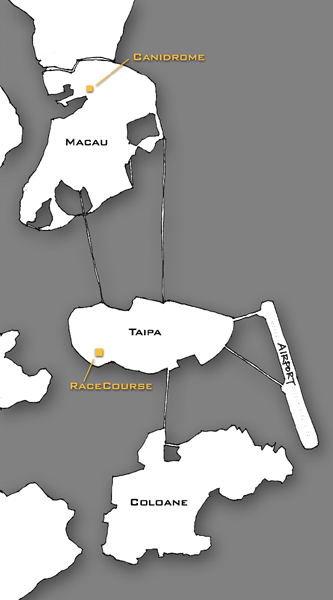
Location of the Race-course and the Canidrome

Horse racing is due to be permanently banned in Macau in April 2024, with the Taipa race-course closing on 1 April.

Other than casinos, there is betting at the Macau Jockey Club and the dog-racing Canidrome.

Horse-racing mainly takes place every Tuesday and Saturday or Sunday at the race-course on the Taipa Island of Macau. The race-course has an area of 450,000 square metres and 18,000 seats for gamblers, and is open only for people over 18 years of age.

The Macau Jockey Club was formerly the Macau Trotting Club. In 1991, it was acquired by a consortium led by Stanley Ho. The Macau Jockey Club is one of the largest private employers of Macau with around 1,400 employees and around 1,100 part-timers.

Some statistics for horse racing in Macau
Year	Number of Visitors	overall betting turnover
89/90	268,561	462,642,000
90/91	305,957	637,308,000
91/92	349,845	979,940,000
92/93	353,730	1,296,616,000
93/94	324,953	1,296,133,000
94/95	367,185	1,521,334,000
95/96	376,487	2,285,331,000
96/97	352,440	2,635,168,000
97/98	369,957	3,421,173,000
98/99	325,444	3,576,040,000
99/00	306,319	3,567,430,000
00/01	284,569	4,019,742,000
01/02	330,298	3,263,321,000
02/03	308,168	3,297,540,000

Ways of betting

- On-course betting

There are over 210 betting terminals "on-course". All terminals can perform sell and pay functions. Punters may bet in Hong Kong dollars or Macau patacas. Bets are accepted up to the start of each race. Punters may place a bet by oral instructions or by filling a ticket.

- Off-course betting

There are over 80 betting terminals in the Off-Course Betting Centres. 14 Off-course Betting Centres are located in popular districts of Macau and Taipa.

- Internet betting

The Internet betting service commenced on 20 September 2003. Customers can review the Club's internet betting website at www.macauhorsebet.com.

- Telephone services

There are over 600 telephone service terminals and a total of over 38,000 telebet accounts. The winning dividend of account holders may at their instructions be automatically transferred to their bank accounts.

- Fast Access Terminals (FAT)

Launched in June 1997, the personal betting terminal, FAT (Fast Access Terminal) offers betting, calculation of bet units, record tracking of bets, account enquiry, withdrawal instructions and other related information on races such as declaration and race-odds. Close to 1,000 customers are currently using FAT.

- Hong Kong Service Centres

Three service centres are now set up in Hong Kong including Shaukeiwan Service Centre, Sheung Wan Service Centre and Mongkok Service Centre.

=== Greyhound racing ===
Greyhound racing is permanently banned in Macau.

The Canidrome closed on 21 July 2018. After negotiations with the track's owner and intense fundraising by an international group of volunteer-run, greyhound adoption organizations led by Anima, 517 greyhounds received veterinary medical care and were shuttled out to be adopted in Europe, North America, Australia, and, for a few, locally in Macau.

== Gaming law ==
Macau is the only place in China where casino gambling is legal.

The gambling age in Macau is 21.

Detailed law is enforced to ensure "qualified operation of gambling" in Macau. The details are listed in Law 16/2001 (regime jurídico da exploração de jogos de fortuna ou azar em casino), and other laws regulating the activity of gaming promoters and credit for gaming.

The Gaming Inspection and Coordination Bureau (known as DICJ) is the main government unit that oversees the operation of different gaming activities.

Under Macau law, it stated that a permit issued by the Gaming Inspection and Coordination Bureau is required for the operation of lotteries sales, lucky draw or similar activities, and the initial procedure in the application on the operation of lotteries sales, lucky draw, or similar activities is to submit a notification to the relevant government department ten days prior to the application.

In the Macau legal system, gaming law is not considered as a branch of law in the traditional sense. Instead, it may be considered as a transversal gathering of a range of legal topics more or less directly related to gaming, including constitutional law, administrative law, tax law, company law, contract law, and criminal law. In this manner, issues of public law as well as private law are of relevance for gaming.

=== Tax law issues ===
The taxation of casino sub/concessionaires is made of a fixed part and a variable part. The variable part falls on the gross gaming revenue. The tax rate is currently 35%, plus two contributions of up to 2% and 3% for social and economic purposes. The maximum tax is therefore 40%. In addition, a fixed premium is also payable, plus a premium per VIP table, other table, and slot machine. Gaming promoters pay taxes on commissions received.

=== Contract law issues ===
From the perspective of contract law, gaming and betting are contracts which may or may not generate civil or natural obligations for the parties. The matter is regulated in the Civil Code 1999 (art. 1171), which states, drawing from Roman law, that gaming and betting generate natural obligations except in sports competitions and where the law provides otherwise. The problem is that gaming legislation currently does not provide to this effect.

Regarding credit for gaming, Macau law states since 2004 that the granting of credit for casino games of fortune generates civil obligations, which are fully enforceable in Macau courts. Credit for casino games of fortune is defined as any case where chips are passed on to a player without immediate cash payment of such chips; this is an intentionally broad concept. Credit for gaming is regulated by Law no. 5/2004, of 14 June.

=== Criminal law issues ===
From the perspective of criminal law, there are specific criminal offences related to gaming. Law number 8/96/M, of 22 July, prohibits unauthorized gambling; Law number 9/96/M, of 22 July, prohibits animal racing; and Law number 6/97/M, of 30 July, prevents and prohibits organized crime. In addition, general laws on the prevention and repression of money laundering and the financing of terrorism through casinos apply. Cheating while gaming is mentioned in Article 6 of Law number 8/96/M, of 22 July.

=== Problem gambling ===
As of November 2011, exclusion of players from gambling establishments is voluntary. If the person realises that their gambling activities begin to cause trouble, they can turn to the Gaming Inspection and Coordination Bureau to ban them from entering the casino. The government of Macau is seeking the opinions of the citizens on the possibility of establishing a programme that will allow excluding problem gamblers from all casinos without their consent. The Legislative Assembly is currently analyzing the new draft law, which also deals with the problem of exclusion from gambling houses. The law suggests that the person can be excluded from the casino if they submit their own request or approve the request submitted by their relatives.

=== Other matters ===
Competition law matters, and advertising law, as well as the impact of WTO law on gaming, may also be pointed out as part of gaming law. Regarding online gaming, the Macau SAR does not currently grant concessions for online casinos. The current casino concessions only cover land-based gaming, not online gaming.

Macau's junket trade operates in a legal gray area. Macau's gaming law expressly prohibits casinos from loaning money to gamblers, but does not expressly prevent private companies doing so via the junket trade.

In 2011, the Macau government implemented a citywide cap on the expansion of table games, which remained in effect through 2022. The cap limits expansion of table games to 3% and regulators apportion new tables to individual casinos. Electronic games are not counted as equivalent to table games for purposes of the cap. Thus, stadium style electronic games where one live dealer serves dozens of gamblers are still counted as one table for purposes of the cap.

=== Academic research and teaching ===
The teaching of Macau gaming law started in 2005 the Faculty of Business Administration of the University of Macau, in the undergraduate program of gaming management. Since 2007 it is also included in the master program of international business law offered by the Faculty of Law of the University of Macau , in which various theses have already been defended in topics of gaming law.

== See also ==
- Cotai
- Cotai Strip
- List of Macau casinos
- Gambling in China
- Gambling in Hong Kong
- Gambling in Taiwan
