= Sofitel Macau at Ponte 16 =

Hotel in Macau

Sofitel Macau at Ponte 16 澳門十六浦索菲特大酒店
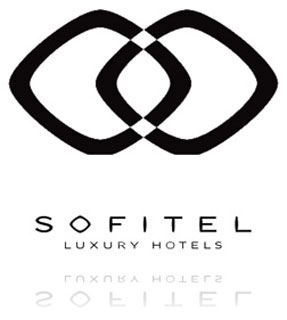

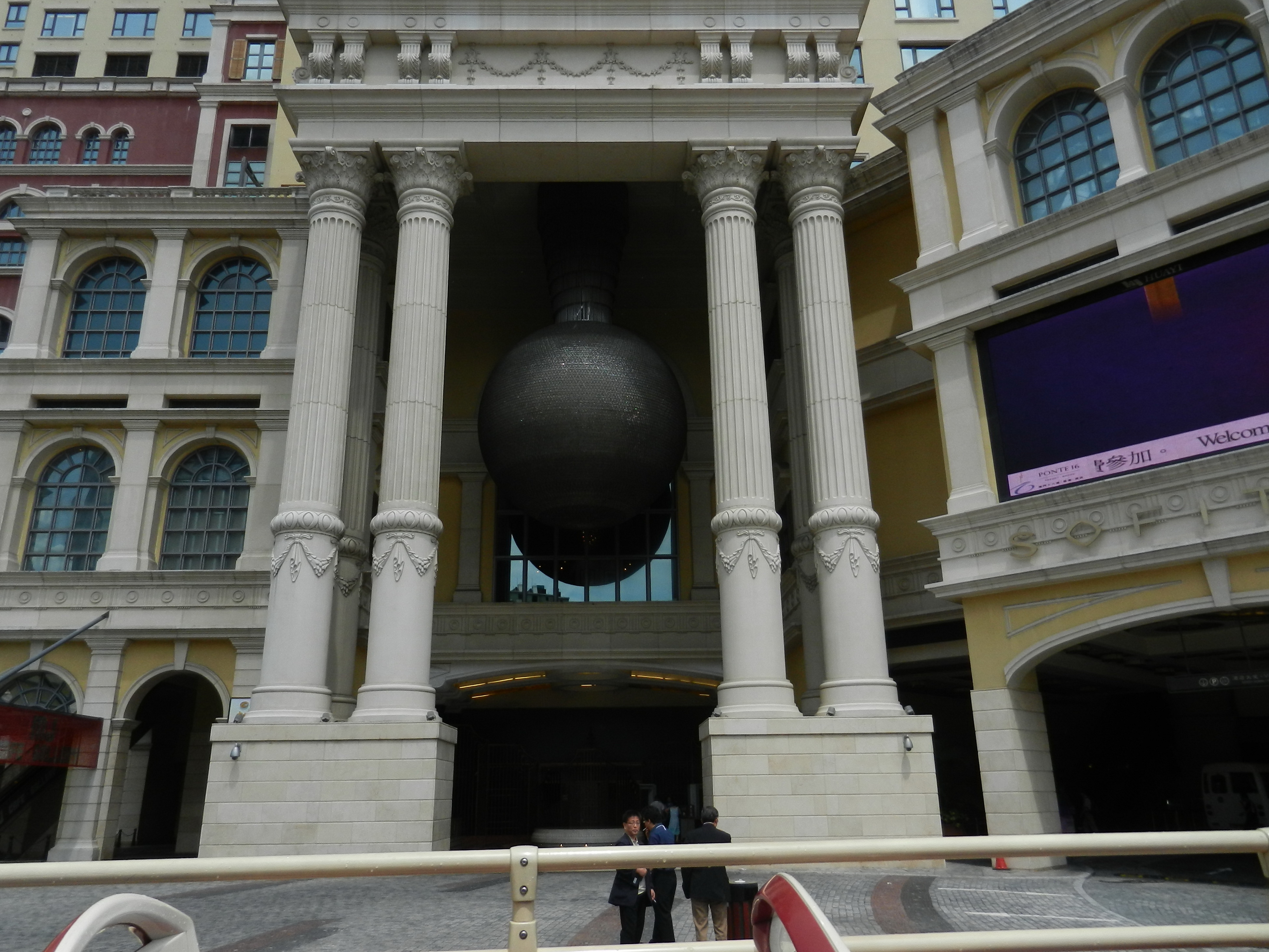

- Location within Macau

General information
- Location: Santo António, Macau, China
- Coordinates: 22°11′49″N 113°32′09″E
- Opening: 1 August 2008
- Owner: Pier 16 - Resort Hotel Management Ltd.

Technical details
- Floor count: 20

Other information
- Number of rooms: 408
- Number of suites: 26 (number of mansions 19)
- Number of restaurants: 3 (Le Chinois, Privé & Mistral)

Website
- https://www.sofitelmacau.com

Sofitel Macau at Ponte 16
- Traditional Chinese: 澳門十六浦索菲特大酒店
- Simplified Chinese: 澳门十六浦索菲特大酒店
Transcriptions
Standard Mandarin
- Hanyu Pinyin: Àomén Shíliùpǔ Suǒfēitè Dàjiǔdiàn
Yue: Cantonese
- Jyutping: ou3 mun4*2 sap6 luk6 pou2 sok3 fei1 dak6 daai6 zau2 dim3

The Sofitel Macau at Ponte 16 (Chinese: 澳門十六浦索菲特大酒店) is a hotel in Santo António, Macau. It is part of Sofitel Luxury Hotels and opened its doors in 2008.

Sofitel Macau at Ponte 16 is a 5-star hotel as defined by Macau Government Tourist Office (MGTO). The hotel offers 408 rooms, spread out over 20 floors, offering views of both the Macau skyline and its bordering city of Zhuhai in China across the inner-harbour waters.

19 suites of the 4 different design themes are located in "The Mansion at Sofitel" which is an addition to the main hotel building. The hotel includes five food and beverage outlets, including the Le Chinois Cantonese restaurant. Others include an all-day restaurant named Mistral offering the option of an al fresco dining environment, Privé.

Sofitel Macau have received a number of tourism awards from 2010 to 2013.

== Location ==
Sofitel Macau is located at Ponte 16 (Pier 16 of the inner harbour) on Rua do Visconde Paço de Arcos, Macau S.A.R.
