= Grand Lapa Macau =

Luxury hotel in Macau, China

Coordinates: 22.19244°N 113.55362°E

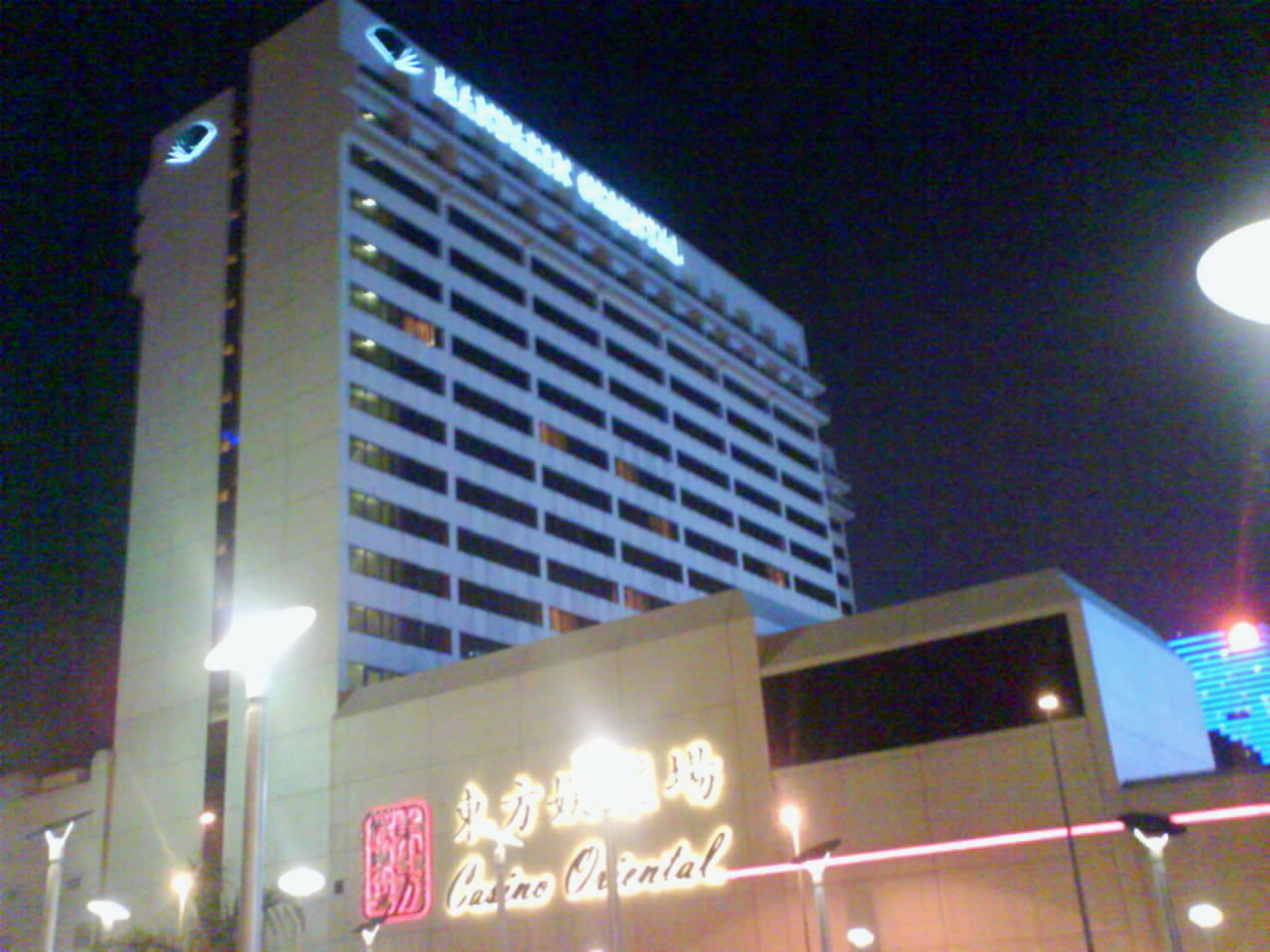
- The hotel building in 2007, when it was still branded as a Mandarin Oriental

General information
- Opened: April 13, 1984

Other information
- Number of rooms: 435

Website
- https://www.grandlapa.com/en-gb

The Grand Lapa Macau is a luxury hotel on Avenida da Amizade in Sé, Macau, China located directly adjacent to the Sands Macao and near the Outer Harbour Ferry Terminal.

The hotel opened in 1984 as the Excelsior and was later renamed the Oriental Hotel and then the Mandarin Oriental, Macau. The hotel was 50% owned by Mandarin Oriental Hotel Group and 50% owned by Stanley Ho's Shun Tak Holdings before being fully purchased in 2009 by another of Ho's companies, Sociedade de Turismo e Diversões de Macau.

The hotel was renamed the Grand Lapa Macau on August 1, 2009, a year prior to the opening of the new Mandarin Oriental, Macau in One Central. Despite the renaming, the Grand Lapa continued to be operated by Mandarin Oriental through January 2014. The 435 rooms are decorated with Portuguese fabrics and teakwood furnishings.

== History ==
The name "Grand Lapa" draws on Lapa, the prestigious Lisbon neighbourhood where celebrities once lived. After Mandarin Oriental's management ended in January 2014, Artyzen Hospitality Group took over in February 2014, and the hotel was later rebranded as Artyzen Grand Lapa Macau. Its history goes back further than the building itself: the Excelsior hotel's first location was a house on Penha Hill that is now the Portuguese Consul's residence in Macau. When Stanley Ho's company took full ownership in 2009, the sale was reported to have brought Mandarin Oriental a post-tax gain of about US$78 million, and the hotel kept its roughly 400 staff. Over the years it was renovated and expanded several times, including a 15,000-square-metre health resort in its backyard.
