= Wynn Macau =

Leisure resort in Macau

- 永利澳門 (Yue Chinese)

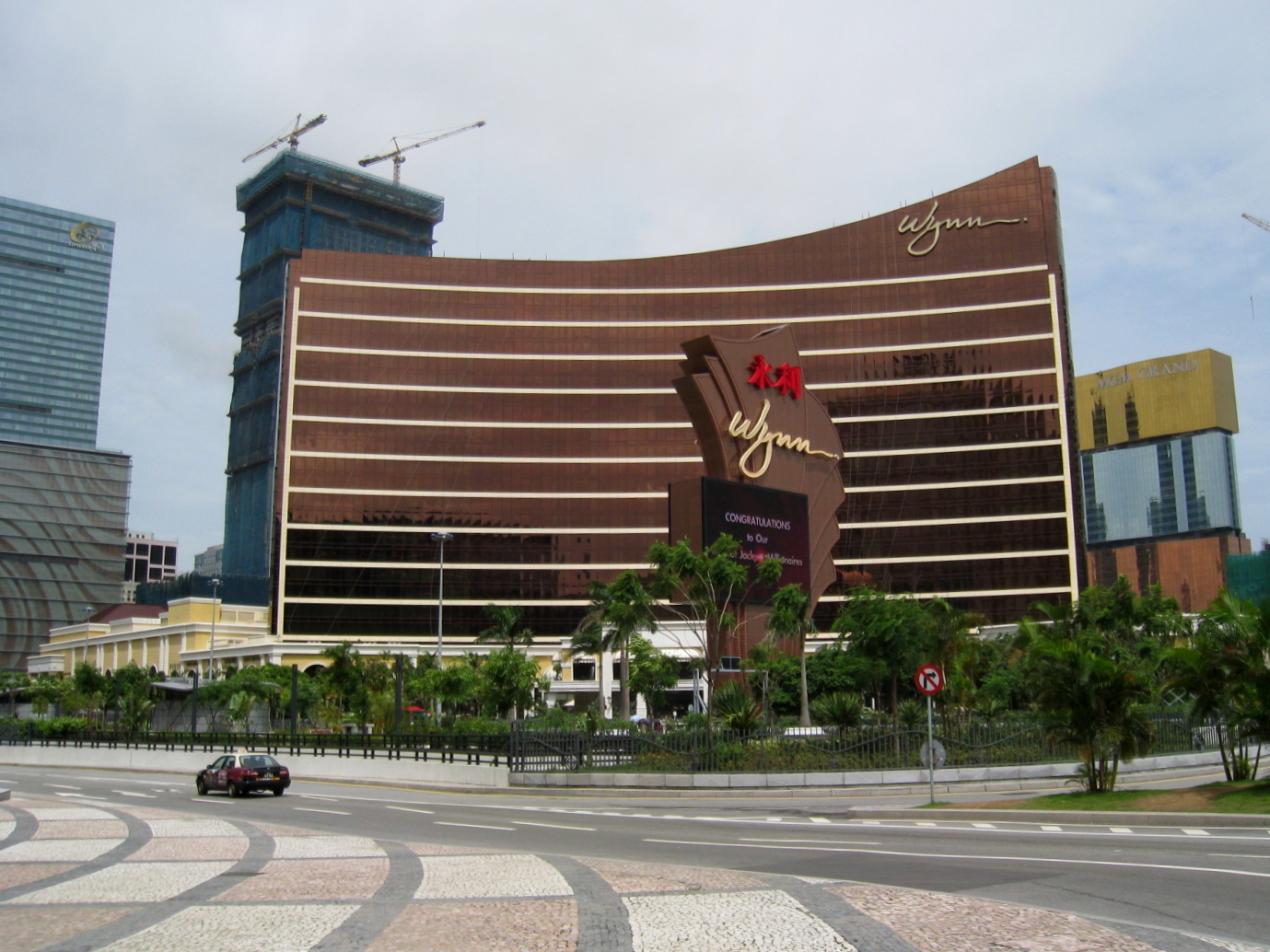
- Interactive map of Wynn Macau
- Location: Sé, Macau; Rua Cidade de Sintra, NAPE; 22°11′17″N 113°32′45″E
- Opened: 6 September 2006; 20 years ago
- Theme: Life imitating art
- No. of rooms: 1,008 (594 in Wynn tower, 414 in Encore at Wynn Macau)
- Gaming space: 25,400 square metres (273,000 sq ft)
- Notable restaurants: Golden Flower; Mizumi; Restorante il Teatro; Wing Lei
- Casino type: Land-Based; American-styled casino
- Owner: Wynn Resorts Limited, Wynn Macau Limited
- Renovated in: 2014 (Guestrooms and Suites)
- Website: www.wynnresortsmacau.com/en/wynn-macau

Wynn Macau
- Traditional Chinese: 永利澳門
- Simplified Chinese: 永利澳门
Transcriptions
Standard Mandarin
- Hanyu Pinyin: Yǒnglì Àomén
Yue: Cantonese
- Jyutping: wing5 lei6 ou3 mun4*2

Wynn Macau (Chinese: 永利澳門) is a luxury hotel and casino resort in Macau. It comprises two towers containing a total of 1,008 rooms and suites, approximately 25,400 square metres (273,000 sq ft) of casino space, over 5,500 square metres (59,000 sq ft) of retail space, eight casual and fine dining restaurants, two spas, a salon and a pool. Wynn Macau is operated by international resort developer Wynn Resorts. Wynn Macau opened on 6 September 2006 and its second tower, Encore, opened on 21 April 2010.

== History ==
Wynn Macau opened to the public on 6 September 2006. In December 2007, Wynn Macau completed an expansion, adding more gaming space and additional food and beverage and retail shops. The casino at Wynn Macau features 25,400 square meters of gaming space. The resort is one of two properties operated by Wynn Resorts in Macau, the other being Wynn Palace.

=== Encore at Wynn Macau ===
On 21 April 2010, Wynn Resorts opened Encore at Wynn Macau, an all-suite boutique hotel, which is fully integrated into the existing operations at Wynn Macau similar to Encore Las Vegas. Encore Macau has 410 suites, including 41 Grand Salon Suites, bringing the total number of guest rooms at Wynn Macau to 1,008.

=== Awards and ratings ===
In 2009, Wynn Macau received its first Five-Star award by Forbes. As of 2020, Wynn Macau is currently ranked amongst the top 25 hotels worldwide.

== Gallery ==
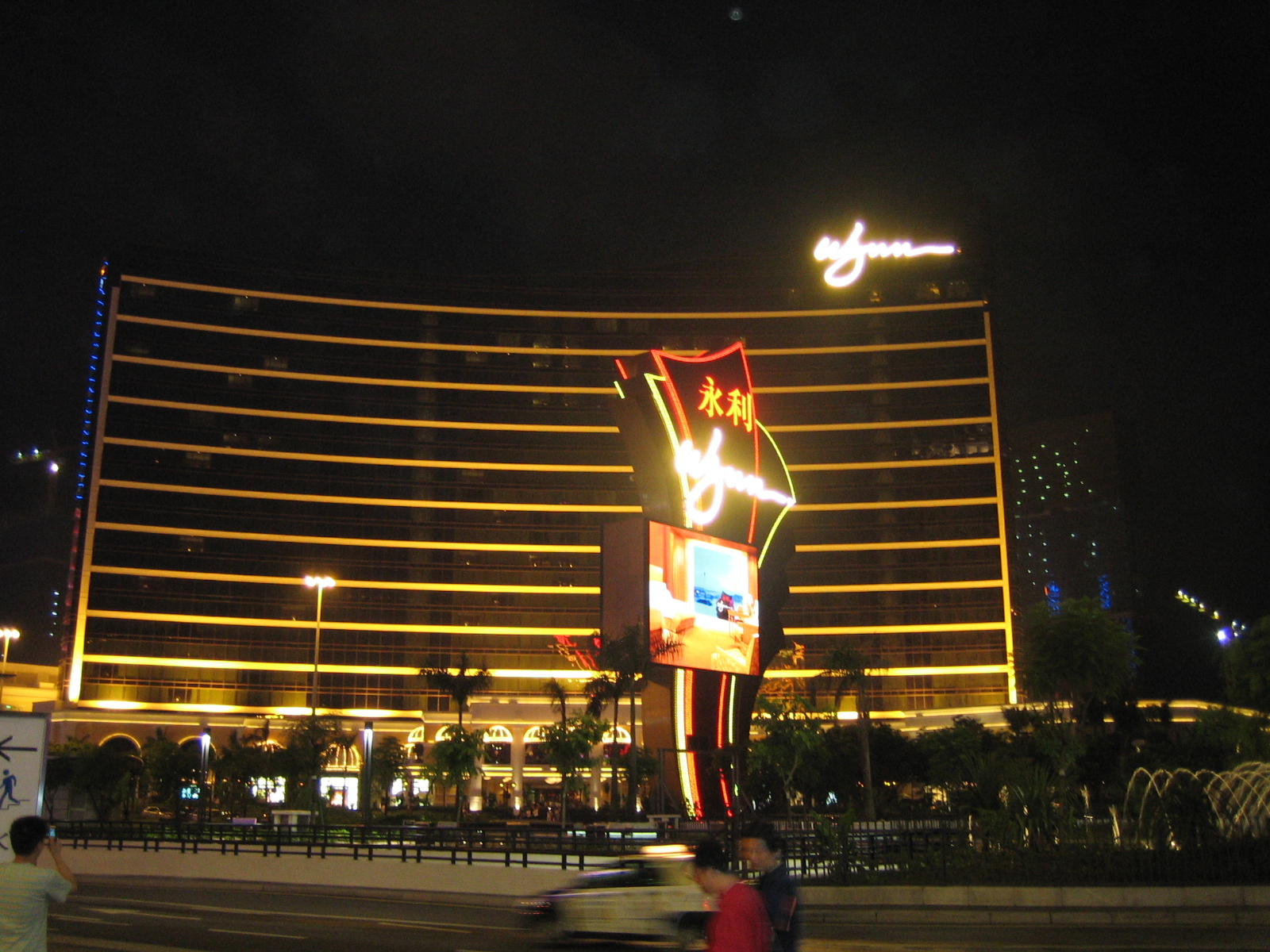
Wynn Hotel and Casino, Macau, at night

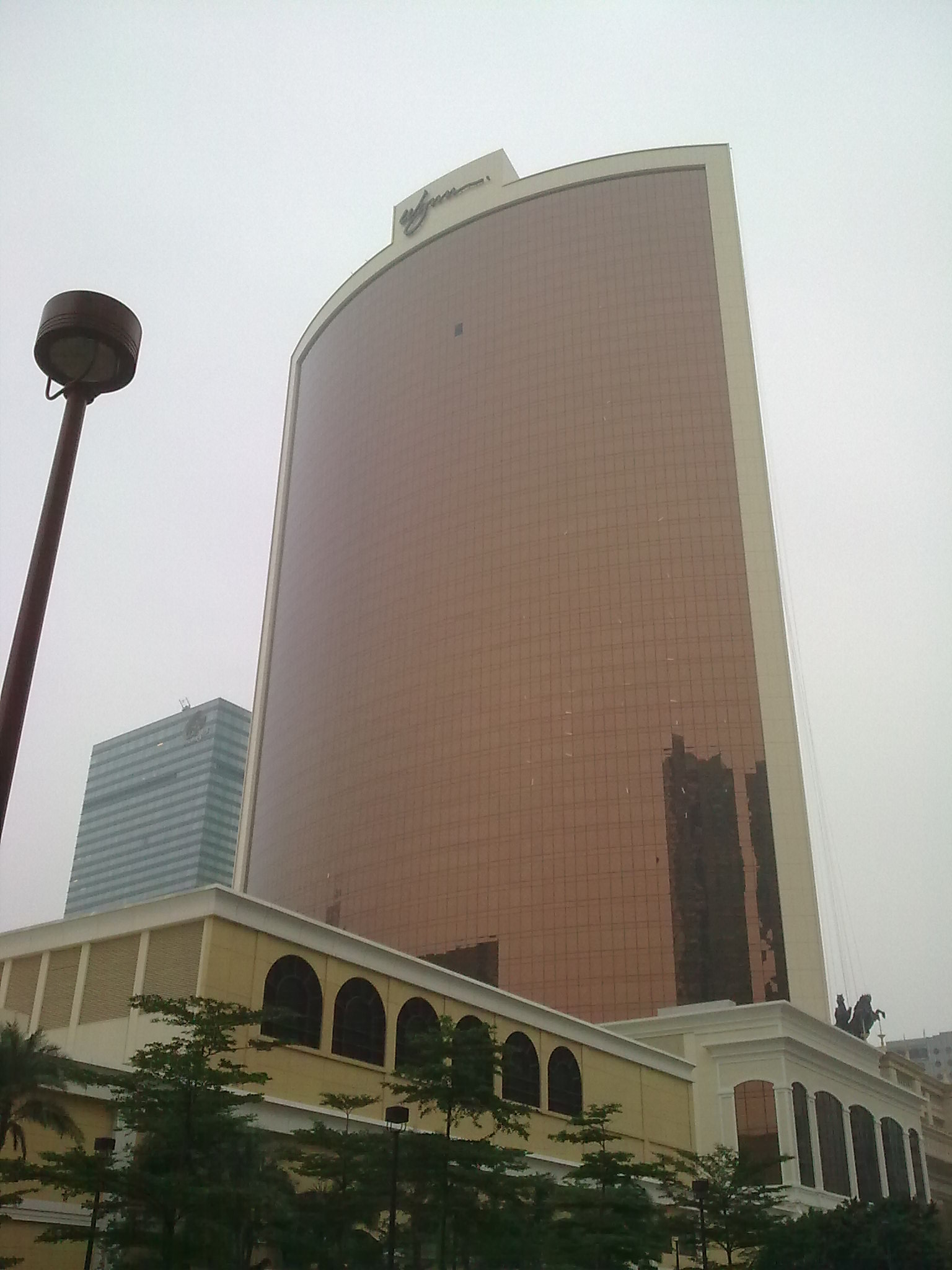
Encore at Wynn Macau

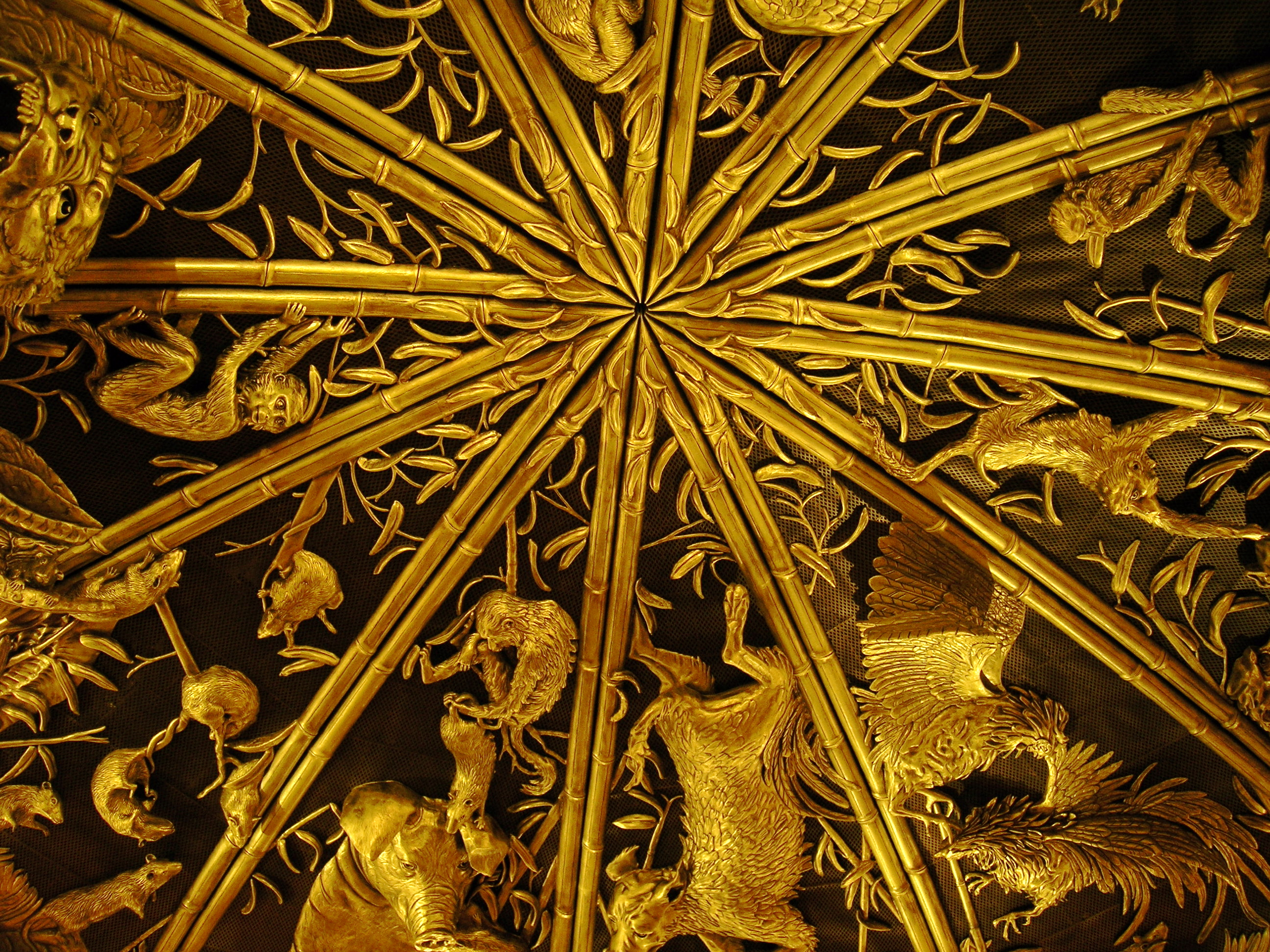
A carved ceiling representing the signs of the Zodiac

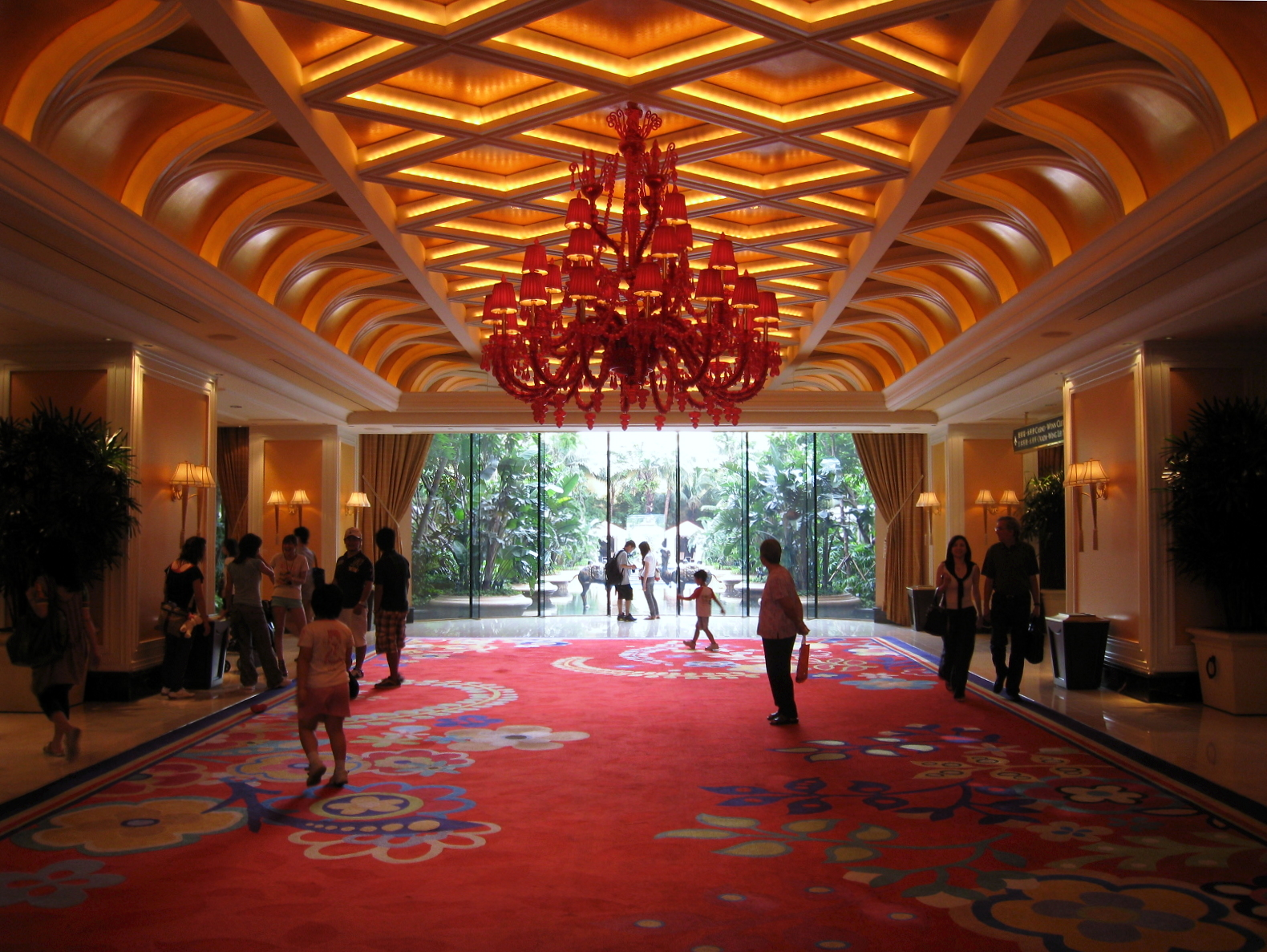
Wynn Macau lobby

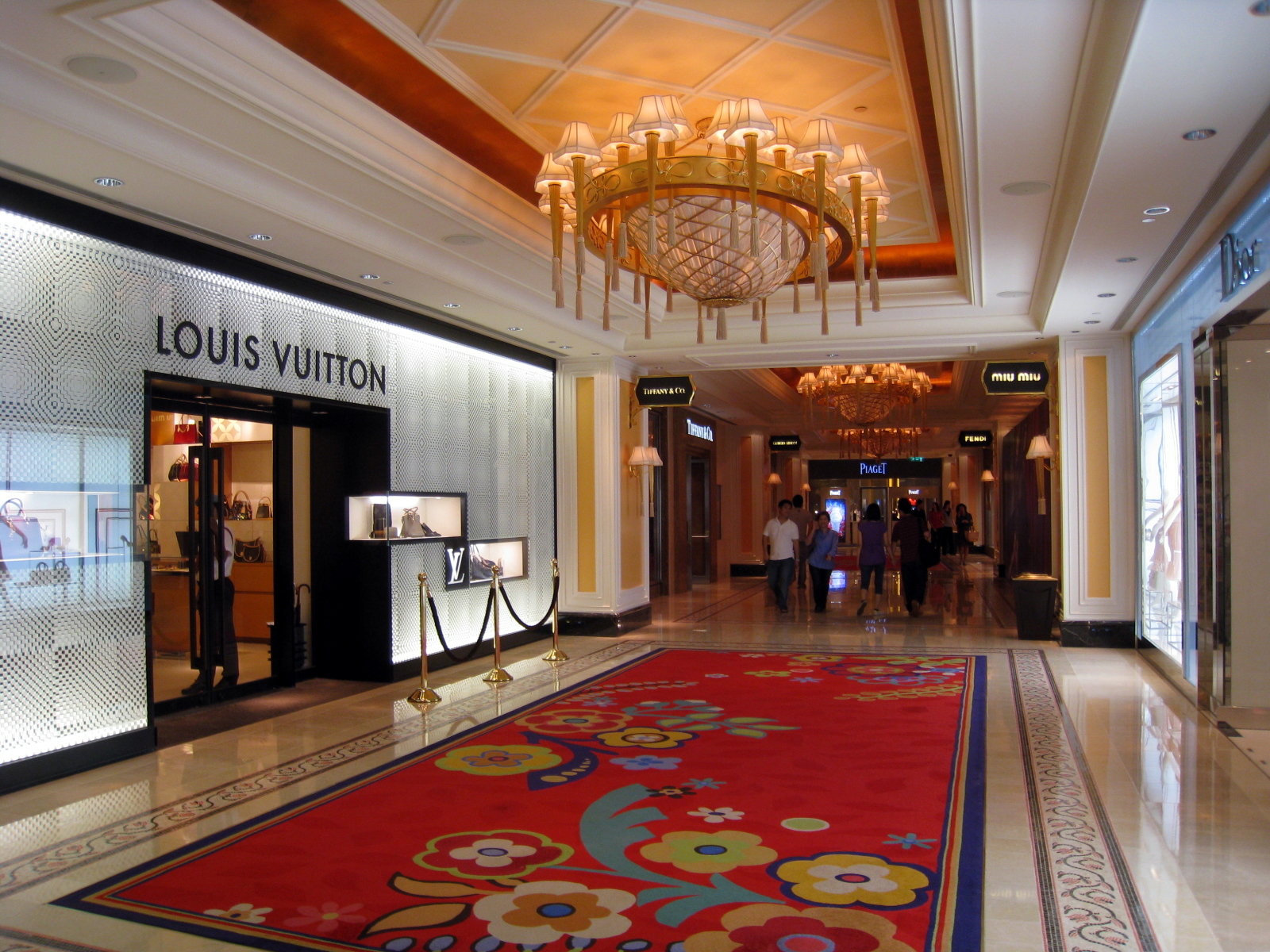
Wynn Macau Esplanade

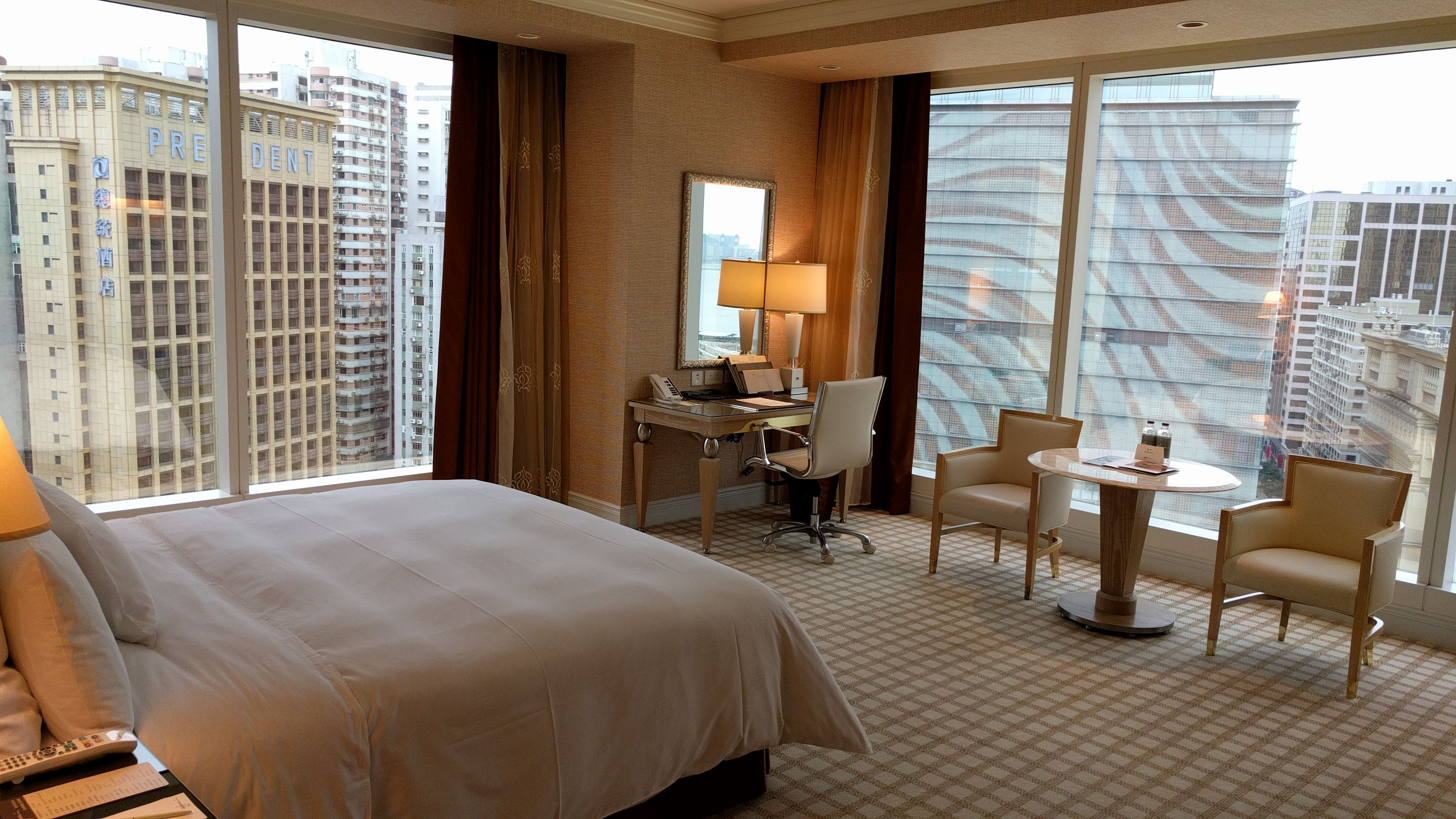
Wynn Macau guest room

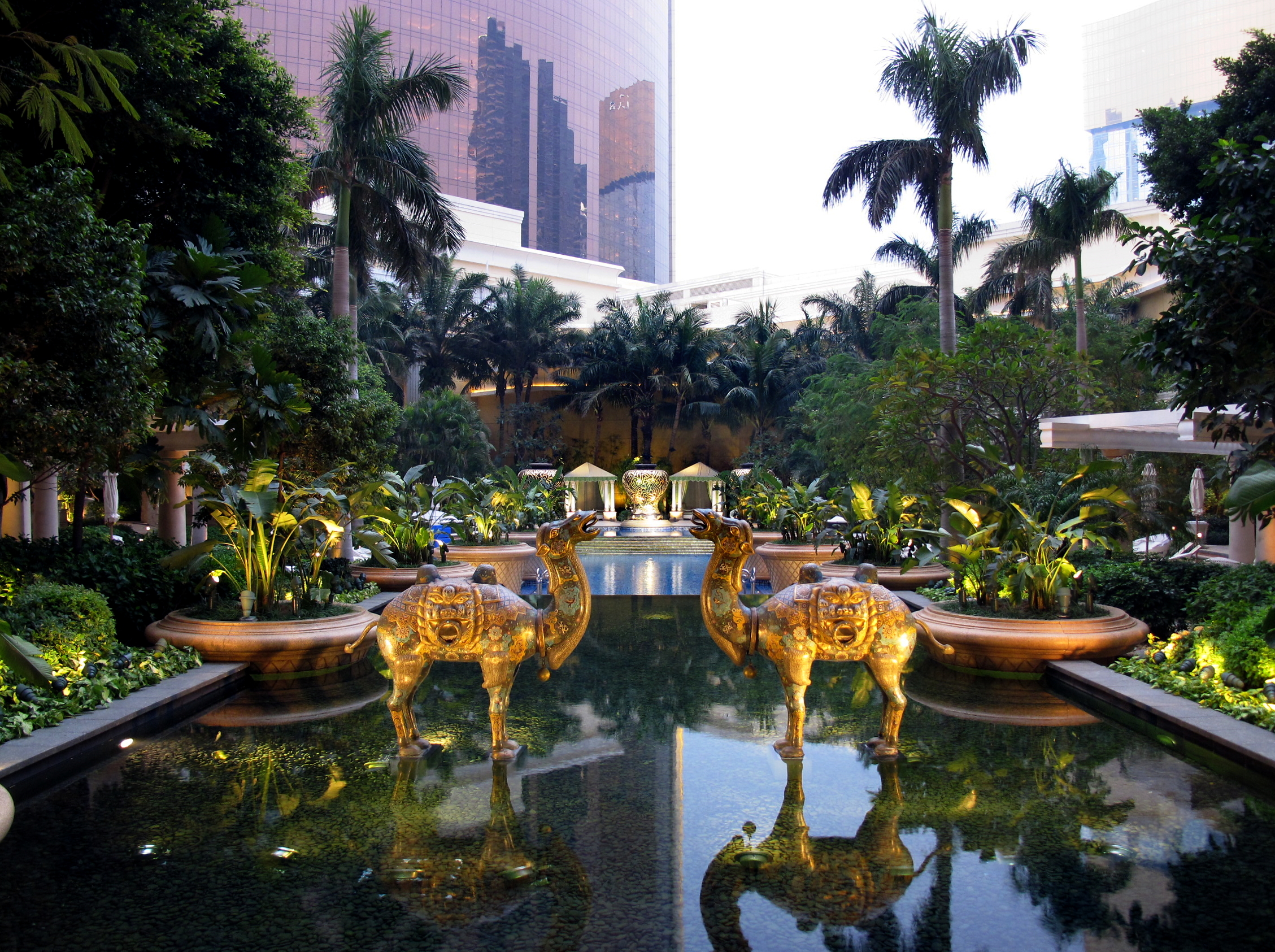
Hotel swimming pool and garden

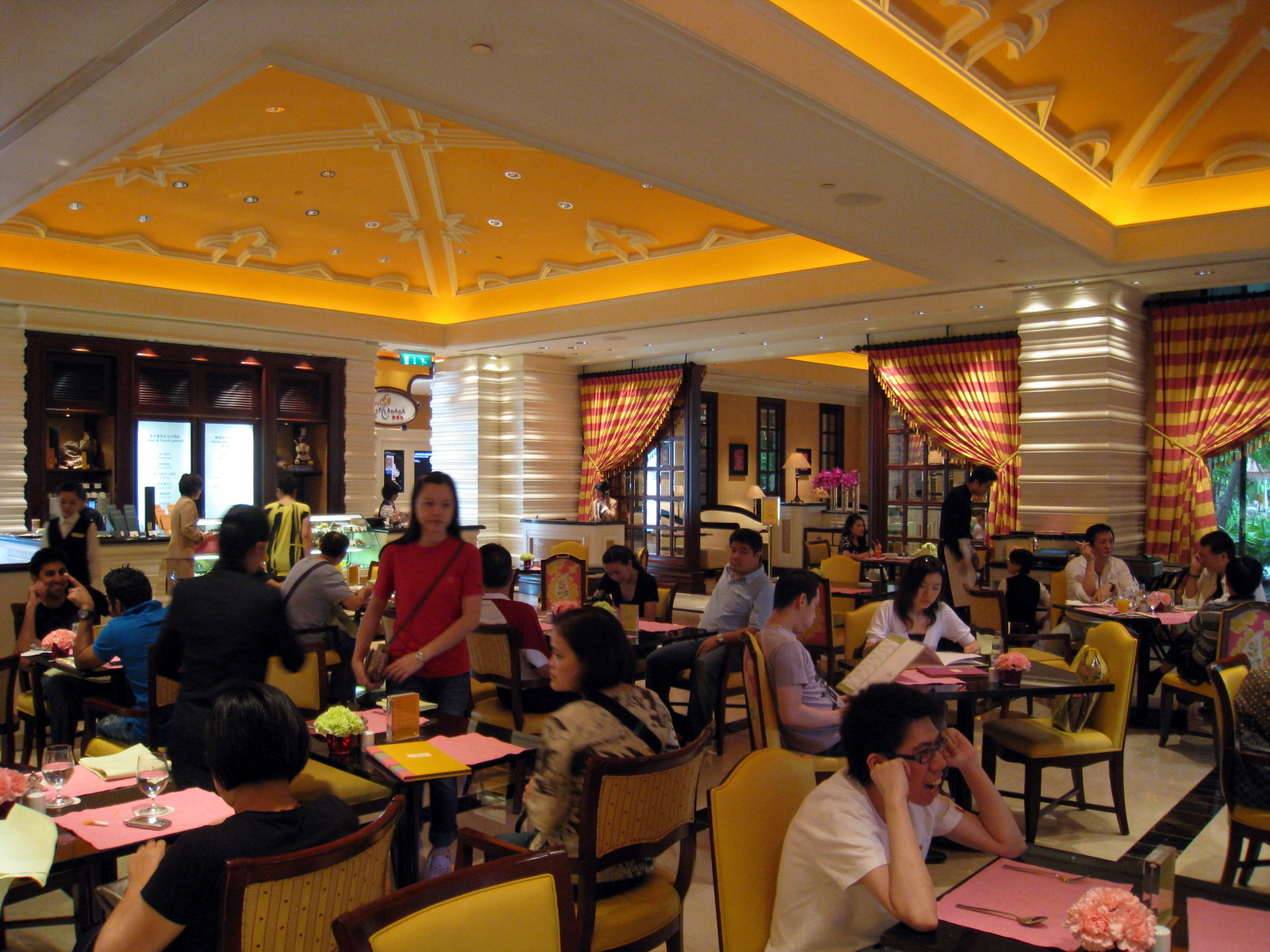
Cafe Esplanada

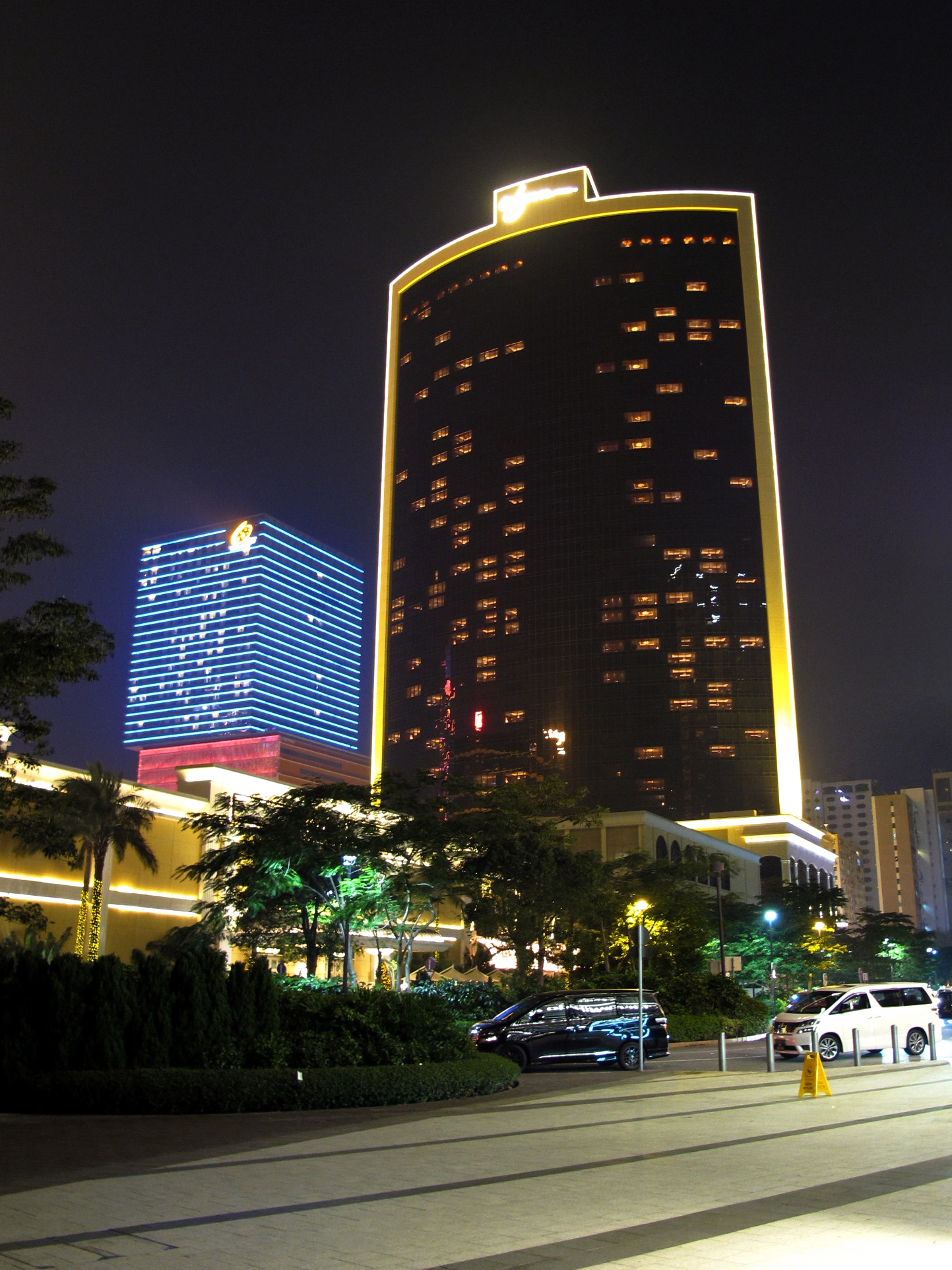
Encore as seen at night

== See also ==
- List of Macau casinos
- Macau gaming law
- Gambling in Macau
- Wynn Palace
- List of integrated resorts
