= Grand Lisboa =

Hotel in Macau, China

- 新葡京酒店 (Yue Chinese); Grande Lisboa (Portuguese)

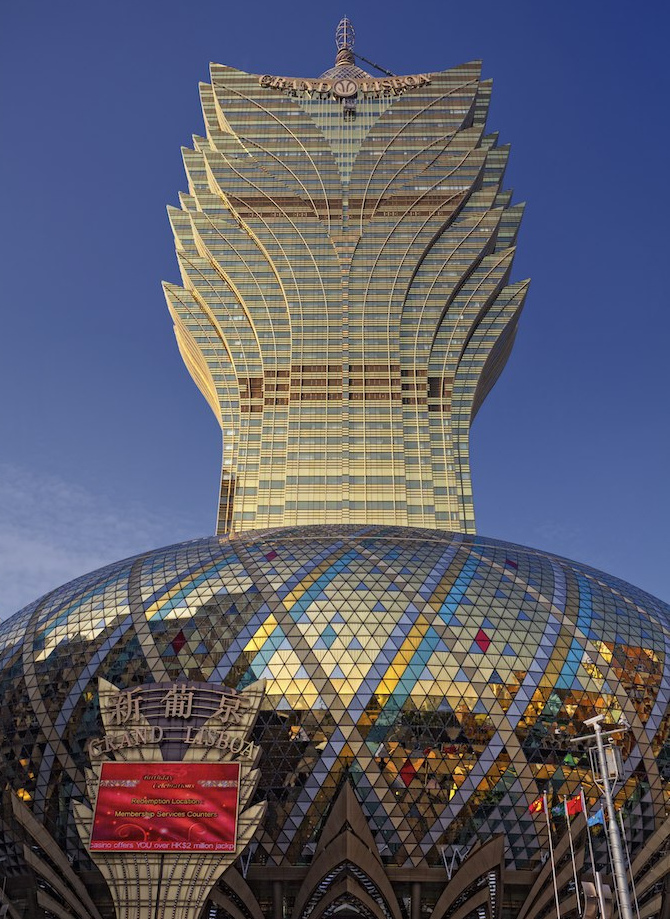

- Location within Macau

General information
- Location: Sé, Macau
- Coordinates: 22°11′26.4″N 113°32′35.1″E
- Construction started: 2003
- Opening: December 2008
- Owner: SJM Holdings Limited
- Operator: SJM Holdings Limited

Height
- Height: 261 m (856 ft)

Technical details
- Floor count: 52

Design and construction
- Architects: Dennis Lau & Ng Chun Man Architects & Engineers (HK) Ltd.

Other information
- Number of restaurants: 8

Grand Lisboa (Chinese: 新葡京, Portuguese: Grande Lisboa) is a 47-floor, 261-metre-tall (856 ft) hotel in Sé, Macau. It is owned and operated by Sociedade de Jogos de Macau and was designed by Hong Kong architects Dennis Lau and Ng Chun Man with the interiors created by Khuan Chew, Design Principal of KCA International. Its casino and restaurants were opened on February 11, 2007, while the hotel was opened in December 2008. The casino offers 800 gaming tables and 1,000 slot machines. The hotel contains 430 hotel rooms and suites. The Grand Lisboa is the tallest building in Macau and the most distinctive part of its skyline.

The casino is the first in Macau to offer Texas hold 'em poker ring games. It was also the first to offer craps, though several other casinos in Macau now offer the game.

In 2017 it was reported that the Grand Lisboa suffered a decline in revenue and profits during 2016.

== Features ==
=== Venues ===
Joël Robuchon joined the group in 2007 as the owner of the hotel restaurant, Robuchon au Dôme, which in 2008 was awarded three stars by the Michelin Guide when it was known as "Robuchon a Galera." The restaurant was renamed when it moved locations inside the hotel. The wine list features over 14,600 wines and has won the Wine Spectator “Grand Award”. In January 2013, the Miele Guide named Robuchon Au Dome as the top restaurant in Asia. It is ranked number 6 in the world by Elite Traveler in 2016 and 2017.

=== Art and attractions ===
The Star of Stanley Ho is on permanent display at the Casino Grand Lisboa. According to the Gemological Institute of America, the 218.08 carats (43.616 g) diamond is the largest cushion shaped internally flawless D-color diamond in the world.

On December 18, 2024, Grand Lisboa Casino in Macau introduced a live multi-game (LMG) stadium on its U2 floor, featuring over 60 gaming terminals. This is the first installation of its kind at Grand Lisboa, although other electronic gaming machines are available on different floors of the casino. The LMG products were supplied by LT Game, a subsidiary of Paradise Entertainment Ltd.

== Gallery ==
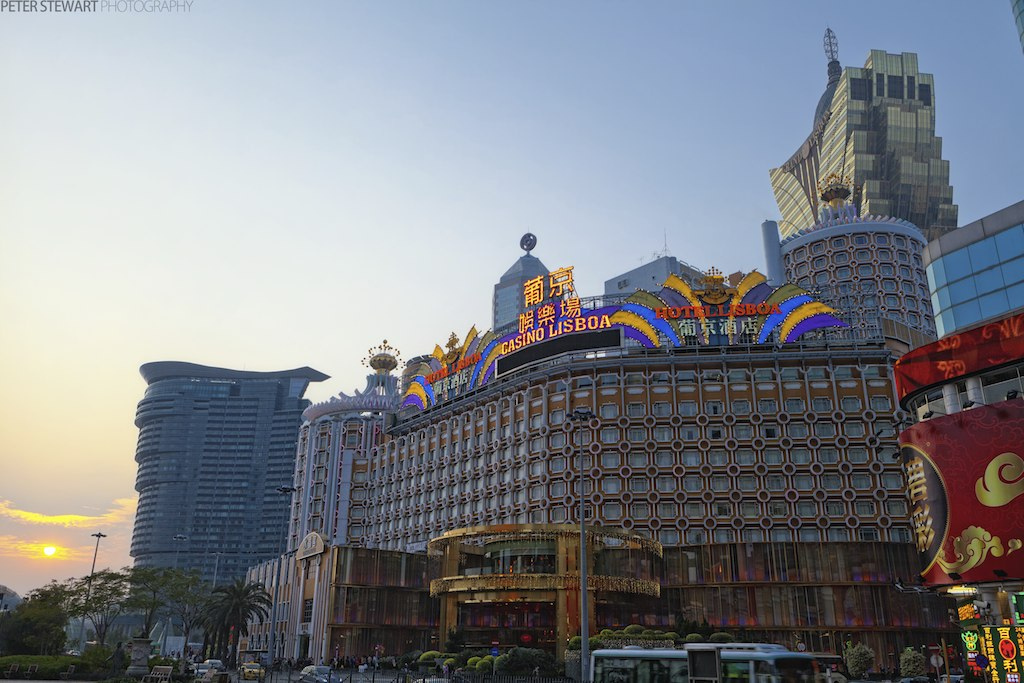
Casino Lisboa

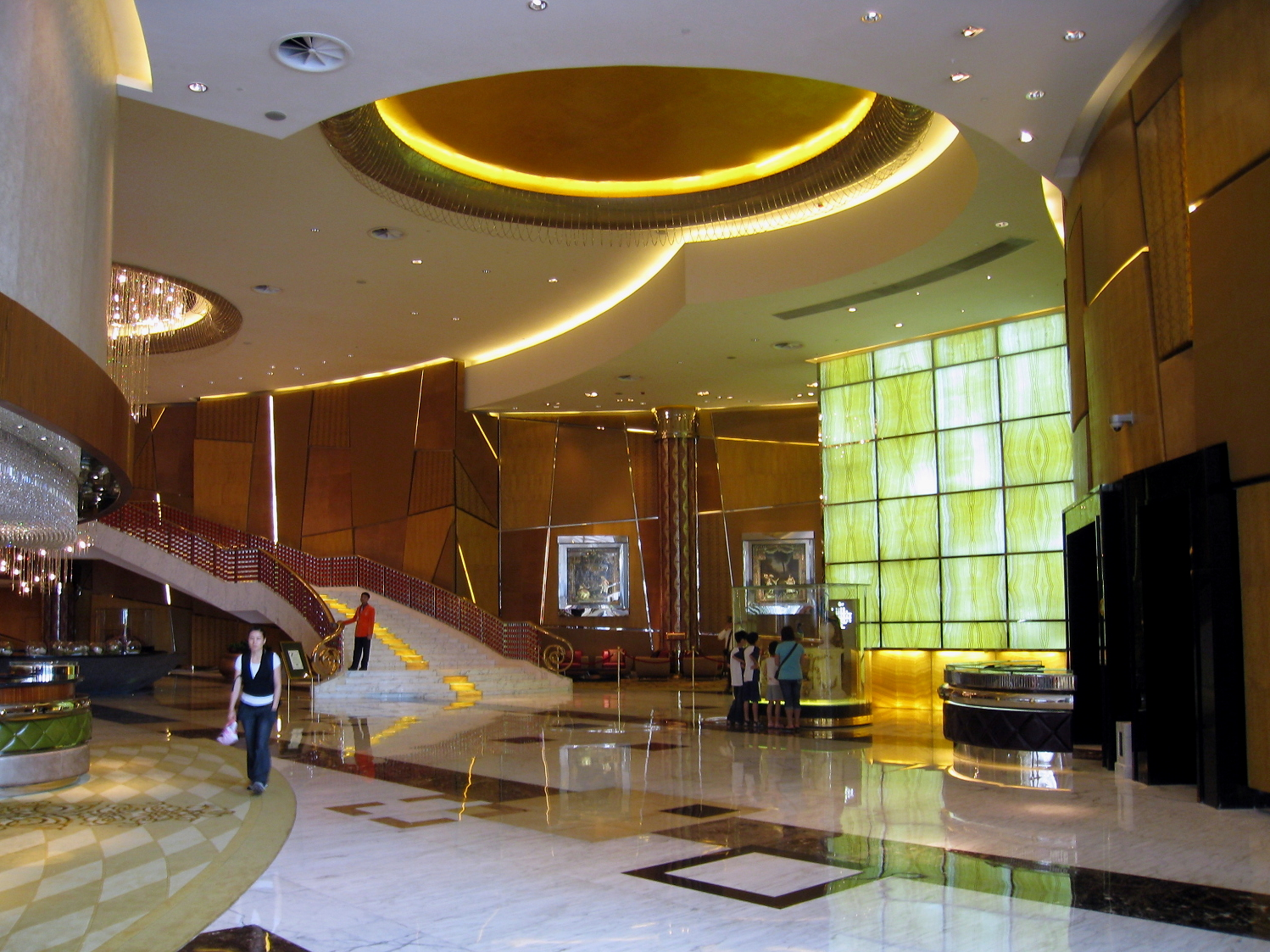
Interior

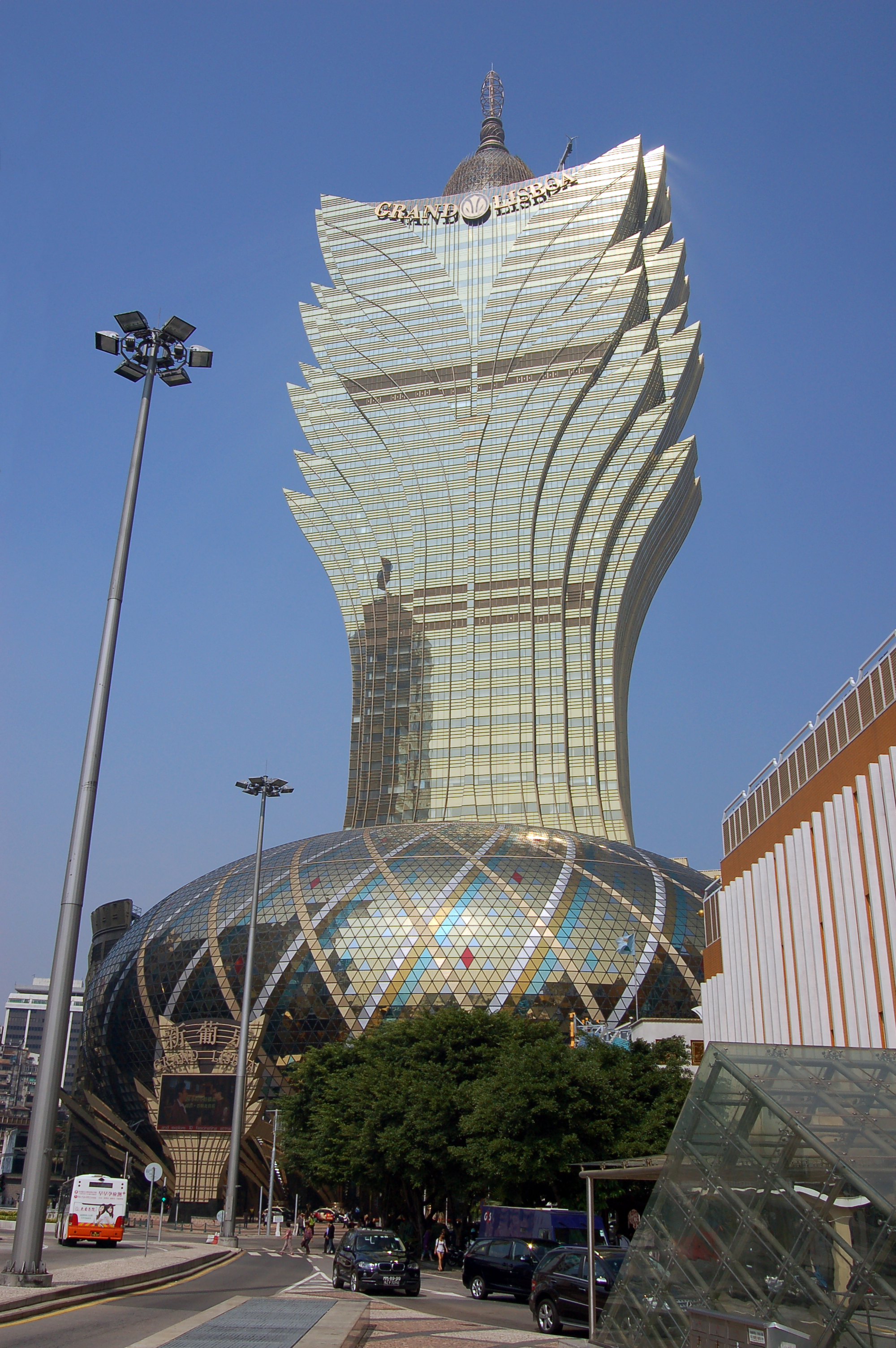
From street level

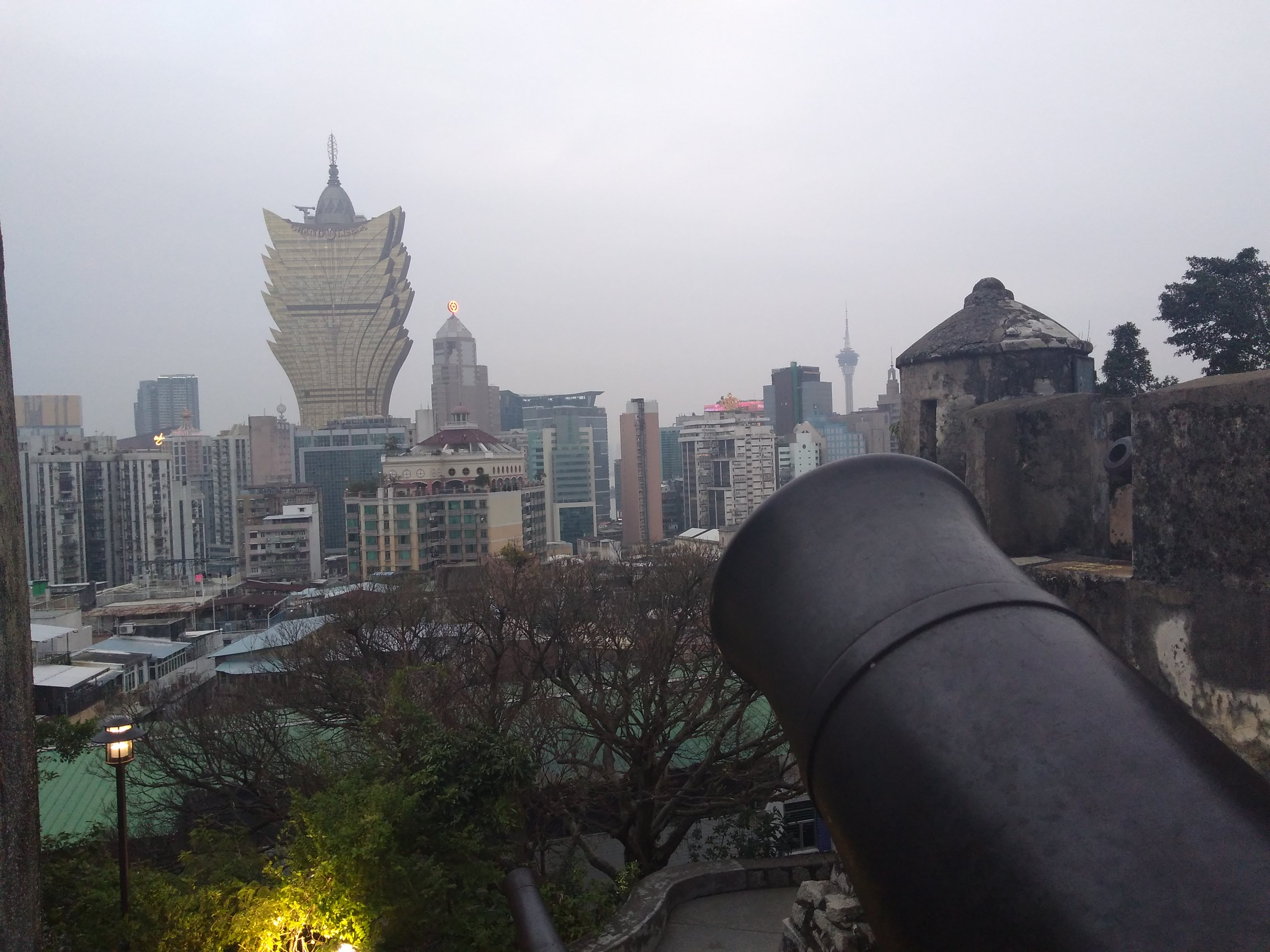
From Fortaleza do Monte

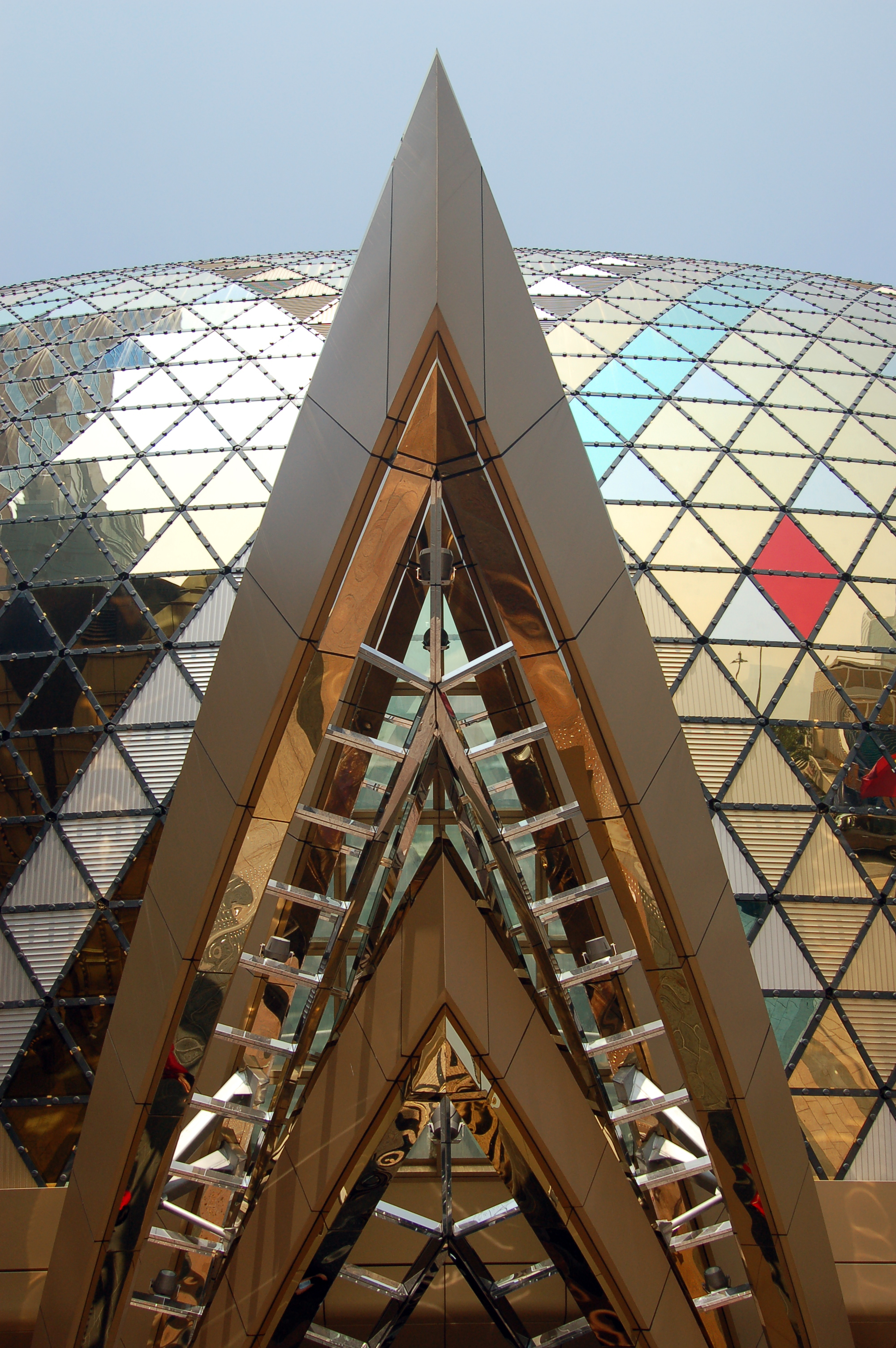
Detail

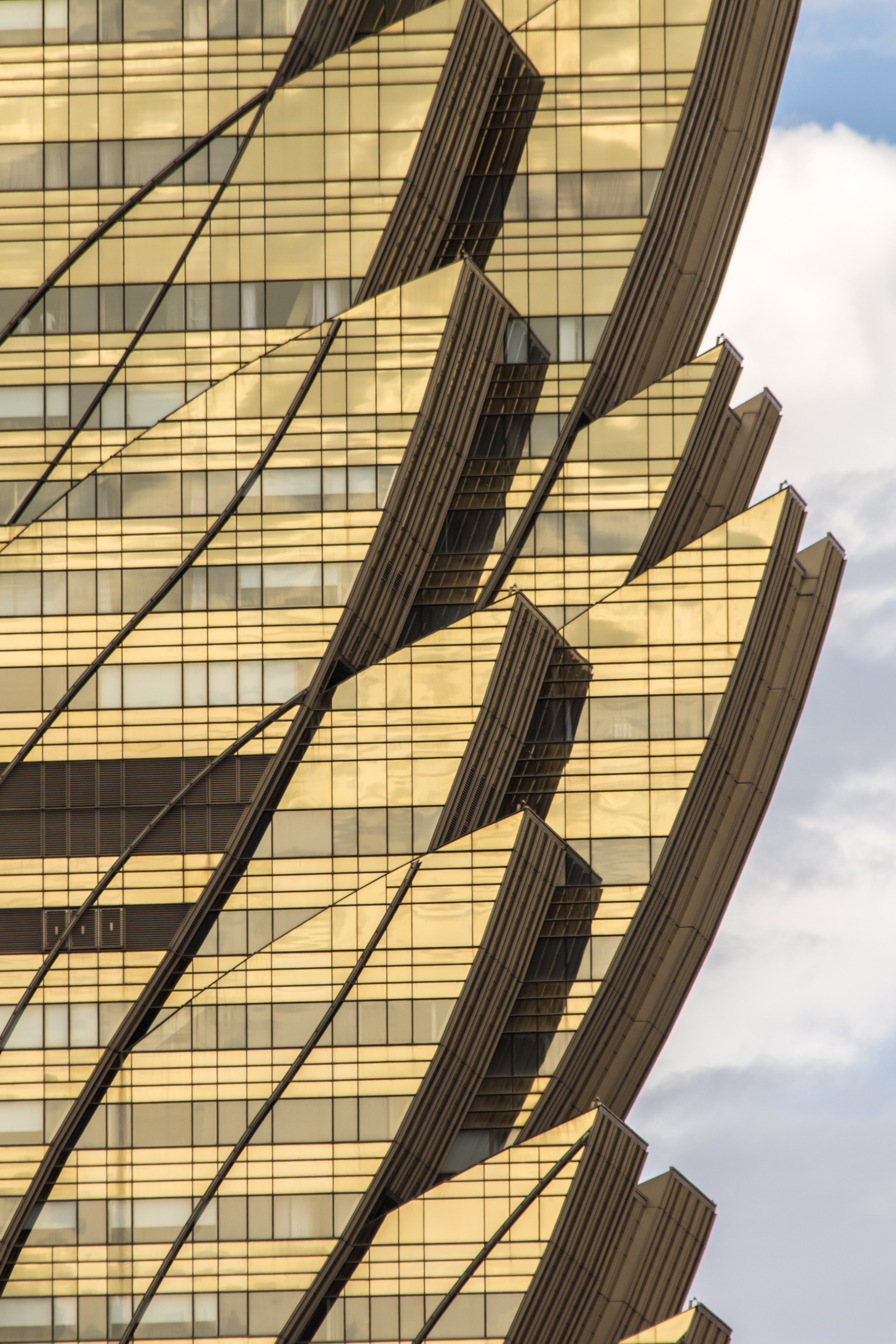
Detail of windows

=== Paul Tsui picture ===
The Invasion is a photograph by Paul Tsui, who was nominated for the National Geographic Travel Photographer of the Year award. The picture depicts a sideway view of the Grand Lisboa hotel, through a street with high buildings in Macau. It has been commented that it resembles an alien invasion.

== See also ==
- List of Macau casinos
- Macau gaming law
- Gambling in Macau
- List of integrated resorts
