= List of tallest buildings in Macau =

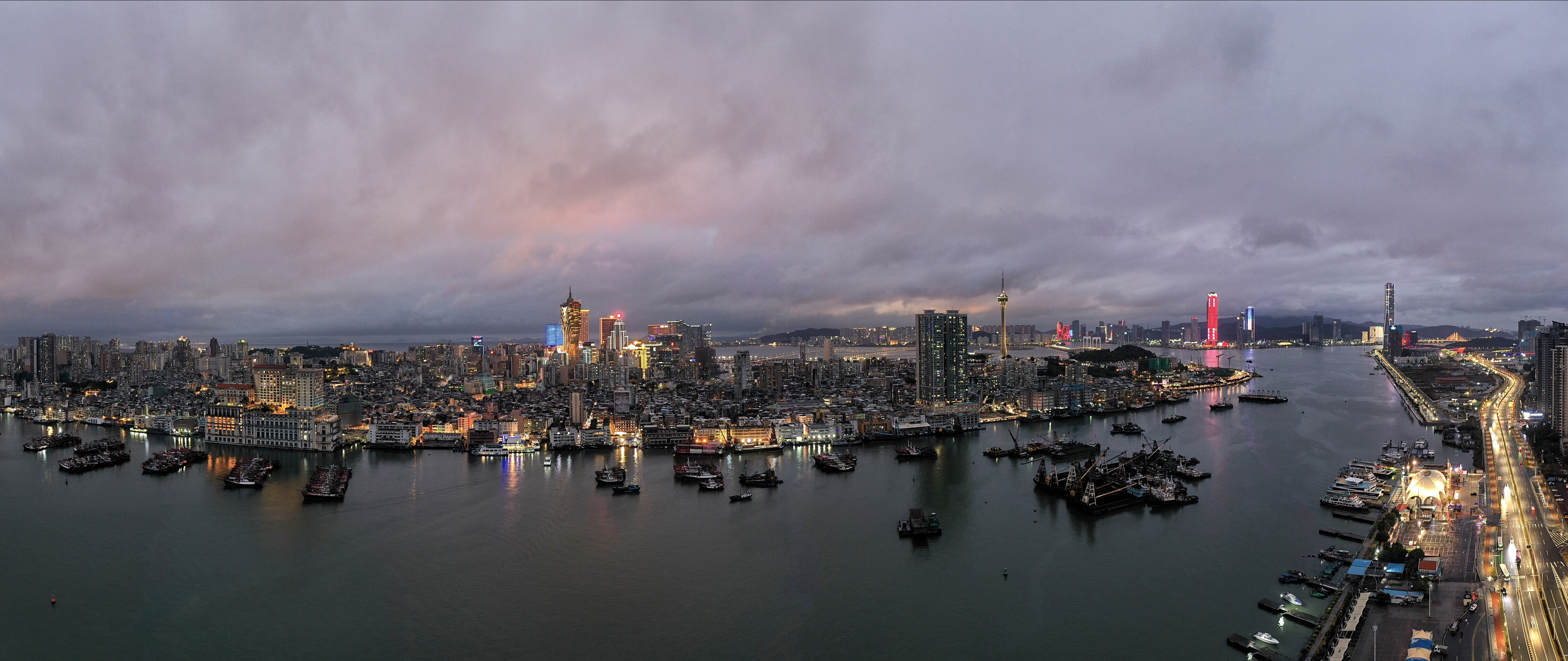
The Macau Peninsula with The Zhuhai City

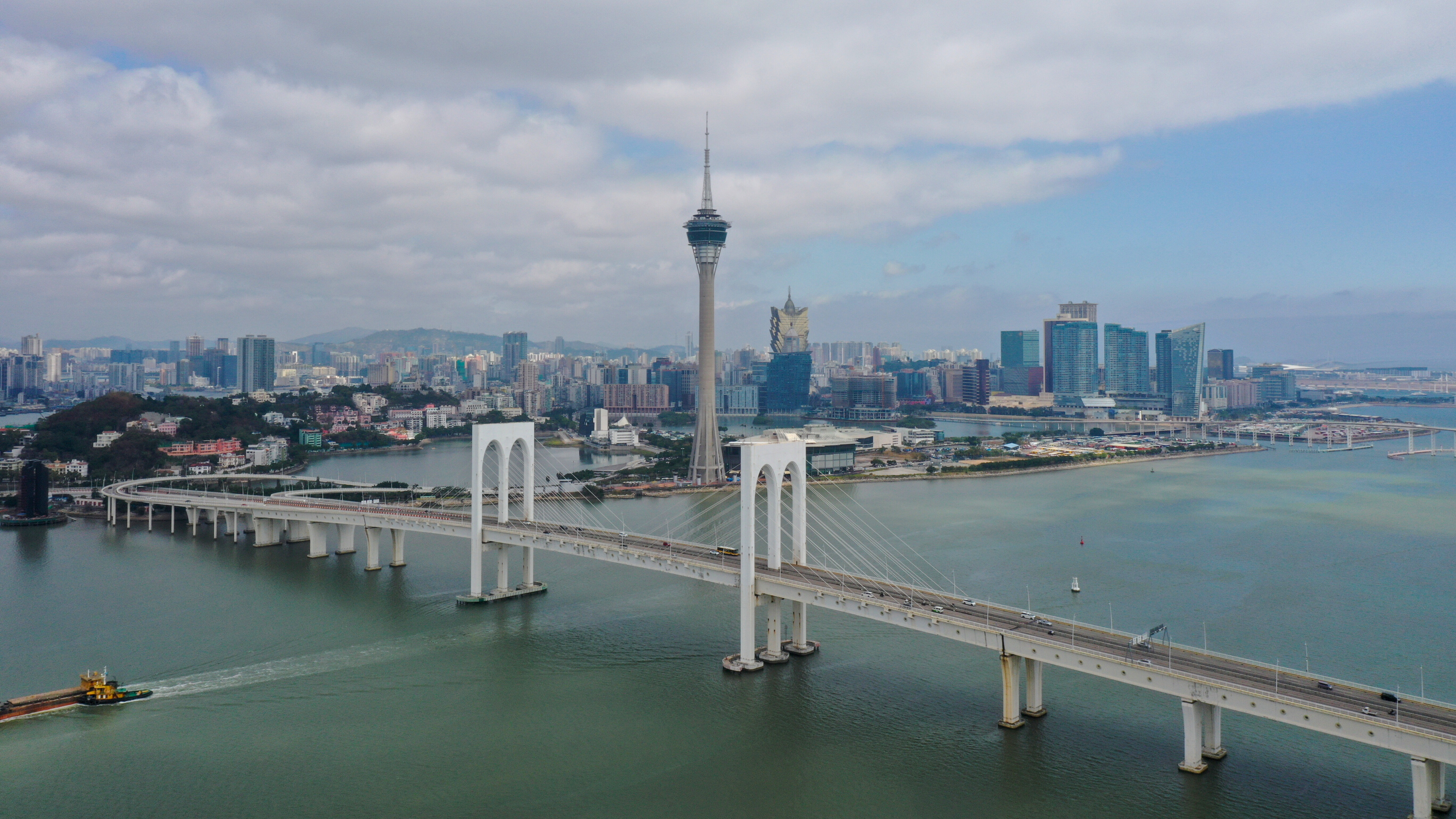
The Macau Peninsula featuring Macau Tower

This list of tallest buildings in Macau ranks skyscrapers in Macau, Special administrative regions of China by height. The tallest completed building in Macau is currently the Grand Lisboa, which stands 258 metres (846 ft) tall.

== Tallest buildings ==
Was the tallest building in Macau upon completion
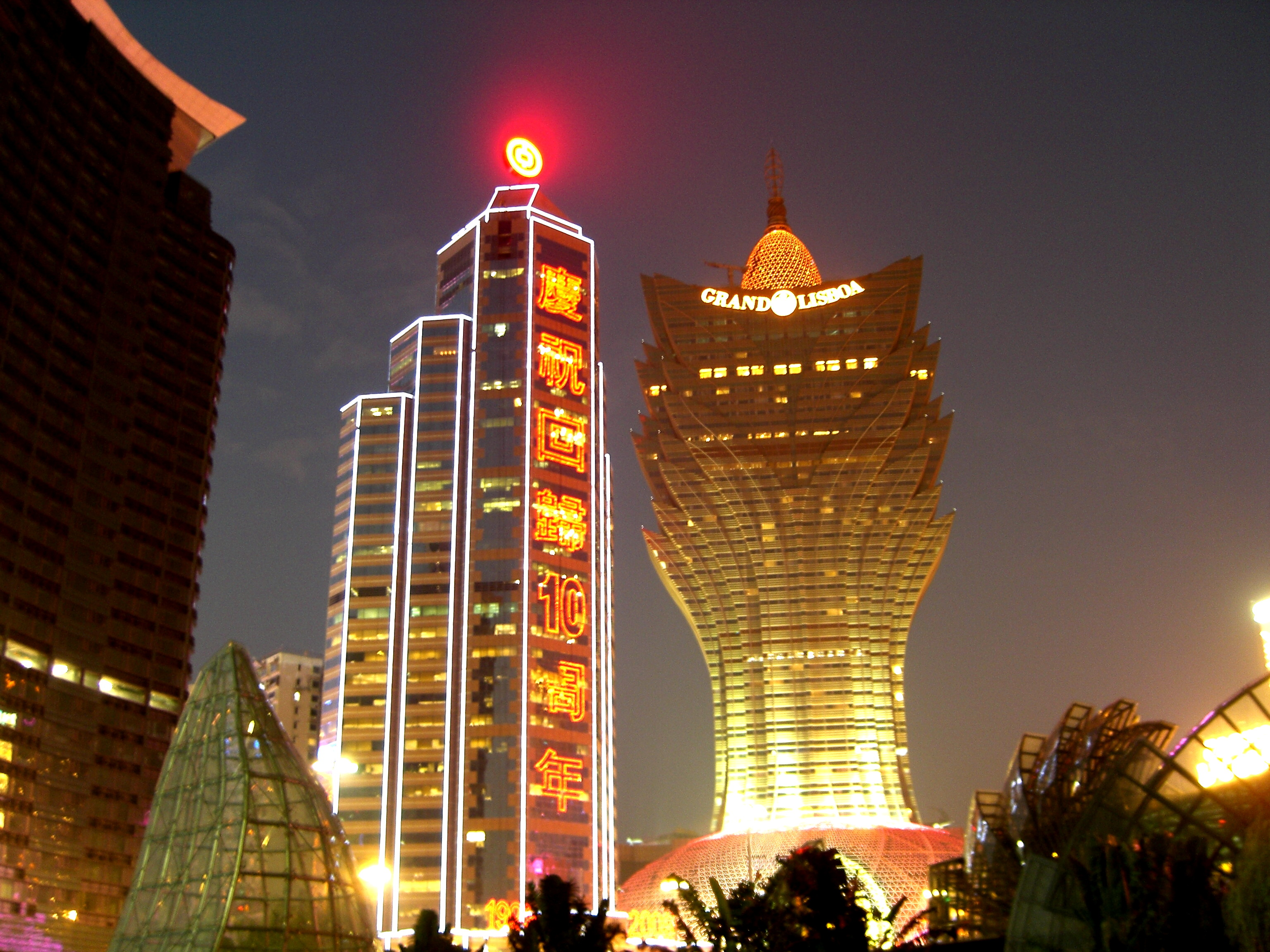
Bank of China Building (left) and Grand Lisboa (right)

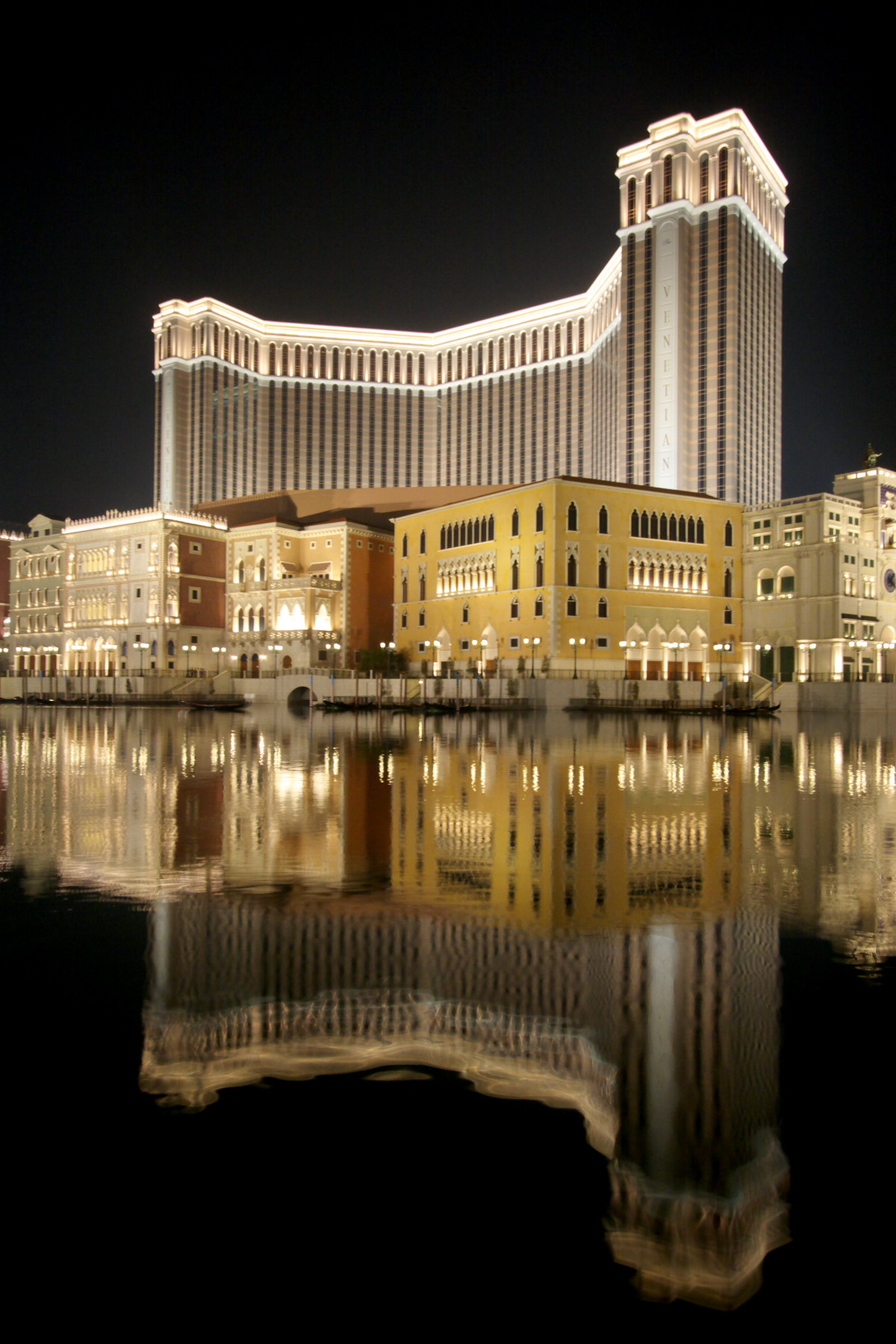
The Venetian Macau

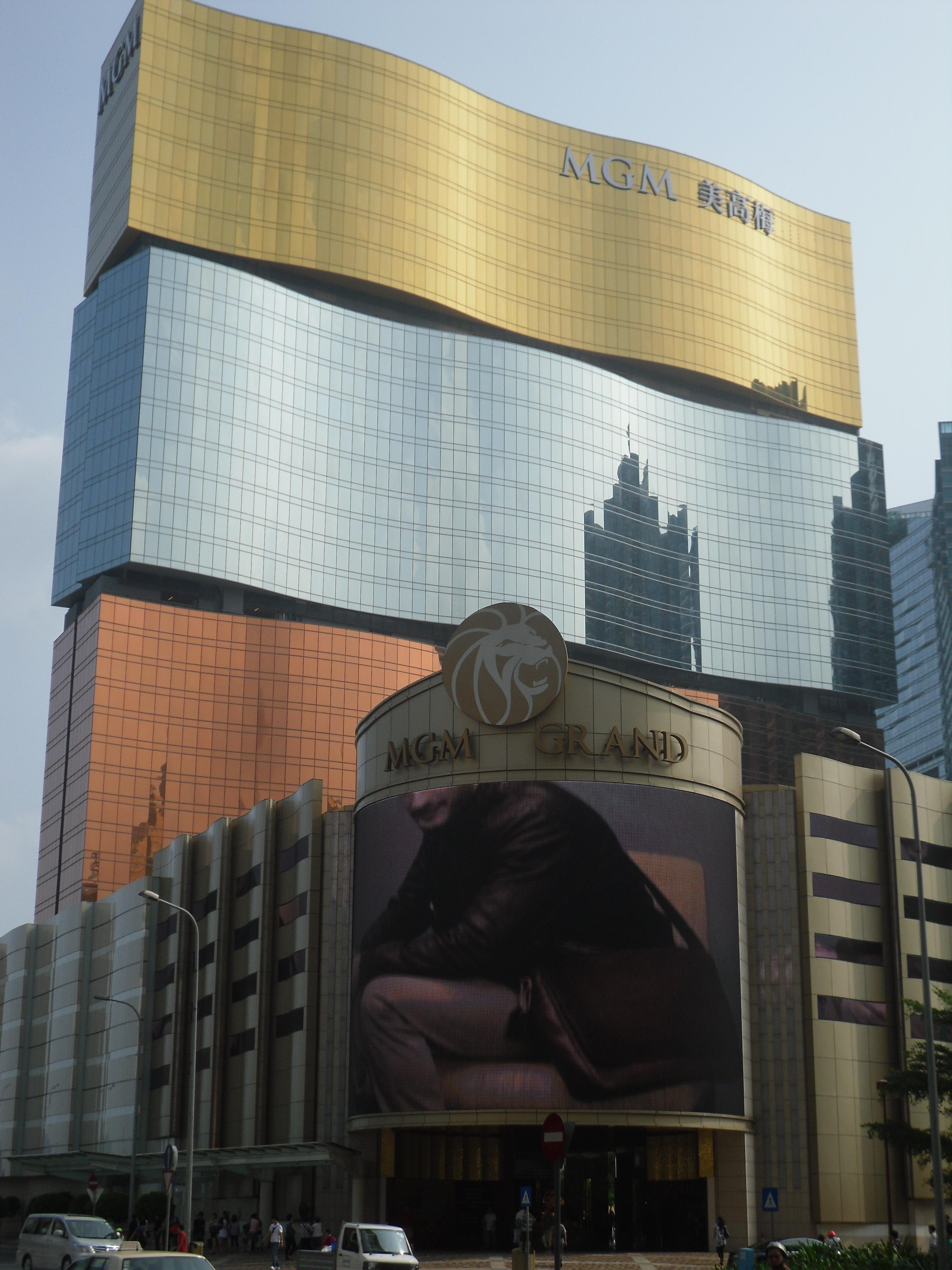
MGM Grand Macau

This lists ranks Macau skyscrapers that stand at least 120 metres (394 ft) tall, based on standard height measurement. This includes spires and architectural details but does not include antenna masts. Existing structures are included for ranking purposes based on present height. The tallest structure overall is currently the Macau Tower, which is used as both a viewing platform and telecommunications antenna.

Buildings taller than 120 meters in Macau
Rank	Image	Name	Height m / feet	Floors	Parish	Year	Notes
1		Grand Lisboa	261 / 856	48	Sé	2008	
2		Le Royal Arc	217 / 712	53	Sé	2009	Also known as Arc Of Triumph.
3		Encore at Wynn Macau	206 / 676	40	Sé	2010	Also known as Wynn Diamond Suites.
4		Baia de Praia Grande	190 / 623	54	-	2009	
5=		The Praia Block 1	185 / 607	56	Santo António	2008	
5=		The Praia Block 2	185 / 607	56	Santo António	2008	
5=		The Praia Block 3	185 / 607	56	Santo António	2008	
5=		The Praia Block 4	185 / 607	56	Santo António	2008	
9		Bank of China Building	183 / 600	38	Sé	1991	Tallest building constructed in the 1990s.
10=		Pearl Metropolitan Towers 1-6	180 / 590	46	Nossa Senhora de Fátima	2025	
10=		Lok koi Building Towers 1-4	180 / 590	46	Nossa Senhora de Fátima	2025	
10=		Lok Koi Building Towers 5-6	180 / 590	46	Nossa Senhora de Fátima	2025	
10=		The Residencia	180 / 590	48	Nossa Senhora de Fátima	2009	
14		Mandarin Oriental Macau	174 / 571	47	Sé	2010	
15		One Central Residences 1-3	171 / 562	47	Sé	2010	
16=		Pak Keng Van Block 1	170 / 558	52	-	2019	
16=		Pak Keng Van Block 2	170 / 558	52	-	2019	
16=		Grandeur Heights	170 / 558	44	Santo António	2011	
16=		Millenium Court	170 / 558	42	Santo António	2008	
20		Prince Flower City	168 / 551	65	Taipa	2008	
21		One Central Residences 4-6	167 / 548	47	Sé	2010	
22=		Villa De Mer Block 1	~165 / 541	48	Nossa Senhora de Fátima	2010	
22=		Villa De Mer Block 2	~165 / 541	48	Nossa Senhora de Fátima	2010	
22=		Villa De Mer Block 3	~165 / 541	48	Nossa Senhora de Fátima	2010	
22=		Villa De Mer Block 4	~165 / 541	48	Nossa Senhora de Fátima	2010	
22=		Villa De Mer Block 5	~165 / 541	48	Nossa Senhora de Fátima	2010	
27=		Studio City Phase II West Tower	~165 / 541	38	Cotai	2023	
27=		Studio City Phase II East Tower	~165 / 541	38	Cotai	2023	
28		Galaxy StarWorld Hotel & Casino	161 / 528	36	Sé	2006	
29=		Buckingham Place	160 / 525	50	Taipa	2009	
29=		Galaxy Macau Fase 4	160 / 525	40	Cotai	2025	
29=		Galaxy Macau fase II	160 / 525	36	Cotai	2015	
29=		Hotel Galaxy Raffles	160 / 525	40	Cotai	2021	
29=		Grand Oasis Towers 1-5	160 / 525	42	Coloane	2020	
29=		Nova Grand Towers 1-8	160 / 525	46	Taipa	2019	
29=		La Marina	160 / 525	45	Nossa Senhora de Fátima	2018	
29=		Sky Oasis	160 / 525	42	Coloane	2018	
29=		Galaxy JW Marriott & Ritz-Carlton Hotel	160 / 525	40	Cotai	2015	
29=		Lake Building Blocks 1-6	160 / 525	48	Taipa	2012	
29=		Altira Macau	160 / 525	32	Taipa	2007	
40		La Cite	156,6 / 513	47	Nossa Senhora de Fátima	2007	
41		Park Residence	156,4 / 513	44	Coloane	2015	
42		Lai San Kok	156 / 511	52	Taipa	2008	
43		Morpheus	155,2 / 509	40	Cotai	2018	
44=		The St. Regis Macao	155 / 512	38	Cotai	2015	
44=		Conrad Macao	155 / 512	39	Cotai	2012	
44=		Sheraton Grand Macao Hotel	155 / 512	38	Cotai	2012	
47		Studio City	154,5 / 507	35	Cotai	2015	
48		The Parisian Macao	154,3 / 506	38	Cotai	2016	
49=		Galaxy Banyan Tree & Okura Hotel	154 / 505	35	Cotai	2011	
49=		Galaxy Hotel Macau	154 / 505	35	Cotai	2011	
49=		The Plaza Macao	154 / 505	39	Cotai	2008	
49=		MGM Macau	154 / 505	35	Sé	2007	
53		Supreme Flower City	~153 / 501	44	Taipa	2005	
54=		MGM Cotai	151 / 495	36	Cotai	2018	
54=		The Venetian	151 / 495	39	Cotai	2007	Second-largest building in the world by floor space.
56=		Nüwa	150,8 / 494	36	Cotai	2009	
56=		The Countdown Hotel	150,8 / 494	36	Cotai	2009	
58=		Windsor Arch Block 1	150 / 492	47	Taipa	2015	
58=		Windsor Arch Block 2	150 / 492	47	Taipa	2015	
58=		Windsor Arch Block 3	150 / 492	47	Taipa	2015	
58=		Windsor Arch Block 4	150 / 492	47	Taipa	2015	
58=		Windsor Arch Block 5	150 / 492	47	Taipa	2015	
58=		Windsor Arch Block 6	150 / 492	47	Taipa	2015	
58=		Windsor Arch Block 7	150 / 492	47	Taipa	2015	
58=		Windsor Arch Block 8	150 / 492	47	Taipa	2015	
58=		Windsor Arch Block 9	150 / 492	47	Taipa	2015	
58=		Windsor Arch Block 10	150 / 492	47	Taipa	2015	
58=		Nova Park	150 / 492	41	Taipa	2014	
58=		South Residence	150 / 492	31	Coloane	2014	
58=		The Riviera Macau	150 / 492	45	São Lourenço	2009	
72		Grand Hyatt Macau	149,4 / 490	33	Cotai	2009	
73		New Century Hotel New Wing	145 / 476	38	Taipa	2006	
74		One Grantai Towers 1-6	143,9 / 472	33	Taipa	2010	
75		The Paragon - Ascott Macau	140 / 459	29	Sé	2014	
76=		Mong Son Building	135 / 442	35	Nossa Senhora de Fátima	2024	
76=		Ut Koi Building	135 / 442	34	Nossa Senhora de Fátima	2024	
76=		Government Elderly Housing	135 / 442	37	Nossa Senhora de Fátima	2023	
76=		Mong Tak Building	135 / 442	37	Nossa Senhora de Fátima	2021	
80		Richlink 188 Noble Court	134,4 / 441	50	Nossa Senhora de Fátima	2017	
81=		The Peak Towers 1-3	130 / 428	40	Taipa	2015	
82=		Tong Fong Chon Wong Toi	130 / 428	36	Santo António	2011	
83=		Chun Kin Palace	130 / 428	35	São Lázaro	2009	
80=		Sands Macao	130 / 428	23	Sé	2007	
80=		Mong Sin Building	130 / 428	33	Nossa Senhora de Fátima	2010	
80=		The Phoenix Terrace	130 / 428	40	São Lázaro	1998	
87		Kinglight Garden	125 / 410	40	Taipa	1994	
88		La Baie Du Noble	124,9 / 409	36	Nossa Senhora de Fátima	2005	
89=		Nova City	123 / 404	37	Taipa	2006	
89=		Nova Taipa Fase 1A	123 / 404	39	Taipa	1995	
89=		Nova Taipa Fase 1B	123 / 404	27	Taipa	1996	
89=		Sunyield Garden	123 / 404	39	Nossa Senhora de Fátima	1991	
93=		House of Art	120 / 393	16	Taipa	2023	
93=		Galaxy Capella Hotel	120 / 393	20	Cotai	2023	
93=		Mong In Building	120 / 393	33	Nossa Senhora de Fátima	2012	
93=		Macao Daily News Building	120 / 393	23	Nossa Senhora de Fátima	2011	
93=		Rito Palace	120 / 393	35	Santo António	2010	
93=		The Bayview Towers 1-4	120 / 393	35	Nossa Senhora de Fátima	2009	
93=		Kingsville	120 / 393	38	Taipa	2005	

* Indicates still under construction, but has been topped out.

== Tallest under construction, approved, and proposed ==
=== Under construction ===
This lists buildings that are under construction in Macau and are planned to rise at least 120 m (394 ft). Buildings that have already been topped out are also included. A floor count of 40 stories is used as the cutoff in place of a height of 120 m (394 ft) for buildings whose heights have not yet been released by their developers.

Buildings under construction taller than 120 meters in Macau
Rank	Name	Height m / feet	Floors	Parish	Year	Notes
1=	Mongha Public Housing Complex Phase 1 Block A	147 / 482	46	Nossa Senhora de Fátima	-	Upon completion, this will become the tallest, public-housing apartment building in the world.
1=	Mongha Public Housing Complex Phase 1 Block B	147 / 482	46	Nossa Senhora de Fátima	-	Upon completion, this will become the tallest, public-housing apartment building in the world.

* Table entries without text indicate that information regarding building heights, and/or dates of completion has not yet been released.

=== Approved ===
This lists buildings that are approved for construction in Macau and are planned to rise at least 120 m (394 ft). A floor count of 40 stories is used as the cutoff in place of a height of 120 m (394 ft) for buildings whose heights have not yet been released by their developers.

Approved buildings over 120 meters in Macau
Name	Height* m / feet	Floors	Year*	Notes
Harbor Mile Service Apartment	185 / 607	42	2010	
Bel-Lago Block 1	160 / 524	50	2010	
Bel-Lago Block 2	160 / 524	50	2010	
Bel-Lago Block 3	160 / 524	50	2010	
Bel-Lago Block 4	160 / 524	50	2010	

* Table entries without text indicate that information regarding building heights, and/or dates of completion has not yet been released.

=== Proposed ===
This lists buildings that are proposed for construction in Macau and are planned to rise at least 120 metres (394 ft). A floor count of 40 stories is used as the cutoff in place of a height of 120 m (394 ft) for buildings whose heights have not yet been released by their developers.

Proposed buildings taller than 120 meters in Macau
Rank	Name	Height m / feet	Floors	Parish	Notes
1	Hotel Lisboa Redevelopment Project	268 / 879	60	Sé	Vision
2	Eye of Macau	230 / 755	56	Taipa	Vision
3	The L. Resident	130 / 426	41	Taipa	stale proposal

* Table entries without text indicate that information regarding building heights, and/or dates of completion has not yet been released.
