= One Central =

Mixed-use development in Macau, China

- 壹號湖畔
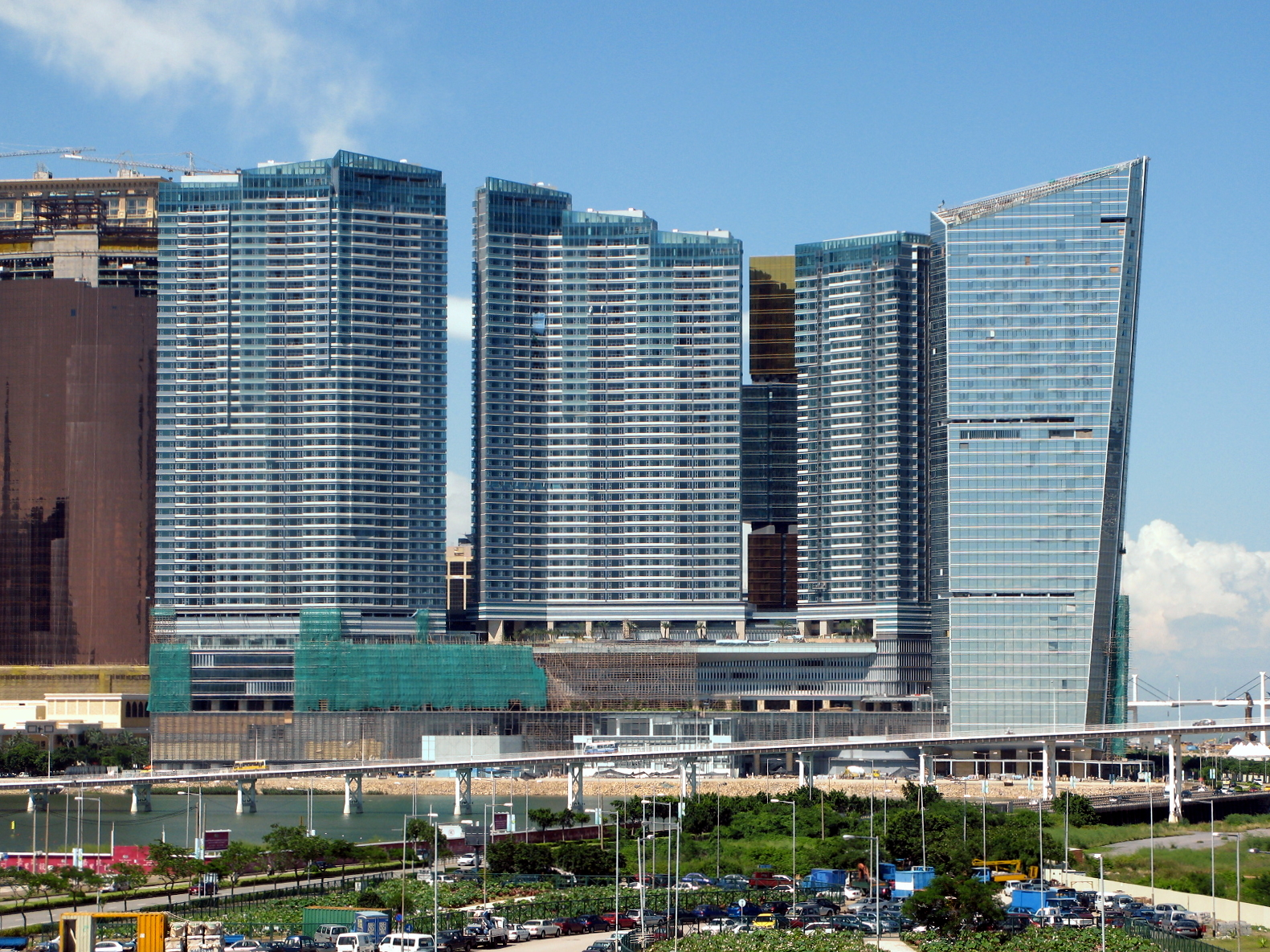

- Location within Macau

General information
- Location: Macau, China
- Coordinates: 22.1854°N 113.5465°E
- Completed: 2009 / 2010
- Opened: 2009 / 2010
- Owner: Shun Tak Holdings Limited / Hongkong Land
- Landlord: Shun Tak Holdings Limited

Height
- Height: 117 metres (384 ft)

Technical details
- Floor area: 2,350,000 sq ft (218,000 m^{2})

Design and construction
- Architects: Wong & Tung International Limited

One Central
- Traditional Chinese: 壹號湖畔
- Simplified Chinese: 壹号湖畔
- Literal meaning: No. 1 Lakefront
Transcriptions
Standard Mandarin
- Hanyu Pinyin: Yīháo Húpàn
Yue: Cantonese
- Jyutping: jat1 hou6 wu4 bun5

One Central (Chinese: 壹號湖畔) in Sé, Macau is a waterfront mixed-used project developed by Hongkong Land and Shun Tak Holdings and completed in 2009.

The 2,350,000 sq ft (218,000 m^{2}) development comprises seven apartment residential towers centred around a 42-storey tower, housing the Mandarin Oriental, Macau with 213 guestrooms, 111 serviced apartments, waterfront bar, restaurant, and spa.

== Location ==
One Central is centrally located on the Avendia de Sagres at NAPE (i.e.Novos Aterros do Porto Exterior), next to MGM Macau at the waterfront and facing Taipa. With Nam Van Lake to the west and the South China Sea to the south, the site is dominated by the presence of water, which heavily influences the design.

== History ==
In 2005, Hongkong Land and Shun Tak Holdings entered a joint venture to develop a 17,000 m^{2} (180,000 sq ft) site on the reclaimed land overlooking Nam Van Lake.

The mixed use development was designed by international design firm Kohn Pedersen Fox (KPF) and completed in 2009. One Central's Mandarin Oriental hotel and serviced apartments were completed in 2010.

== One Central Macau Mall ==
The One Central Macau retail complex comprises a 200,000 sq ft (19,000 m^{2}) retail mall set across a three-level podium. The mall is connected to MGM Grand Macau casino and the Mandarin Oriental, Macau, and close to Wynn Macau, Grand Lisboa, and Star World Macau.

One Central Macau is home to a wide selection of international designer brands. Many of these brands have either opened their first, their largest, or their flagship stores in Macau at One Central.

== Design ==
Kohn Pedersen Fox Associates PC (KPF) were the Design Architects of One Central, supported by Lead Architect Wong & Tung International Limited and Architect Eddie Wong & Associates Limited. The award-winning development has been recognised for the following awards: Quality Building Award - Office (2014), Best Tall Building Asia & Australasia (CTBUH 2011), Certificate of Excellence (Perspective 2010).

During the day, the rippled façade reflects light to create a kaleidoscope effect, while at night the façade is accentuated by dynamic lighting by Brandston Partnership Incorporation.

== Events ==
Macau International Lantern Festival is an annual event that takes place on One Central Macau Promenade. The festival, first held in 2016 and supported by Macao Government Tourism Office, features giant lantern installations created by international artists who jointly design them.
