= Morpheus (hotel) =

- Alternative names: Morpheus Hotel & Resort at City of Dreams

General information
- Status: Completed
- Type: Skyscraper
- Architectural style: Contemporary, neo-futurist
- Classification: Hotel casino
- Location: City of Dreams resort, Estrada Do Istmo, Cotai, Macau, SAR of People's Republic of China
- Coordinates: {22.1499°N 113.5665°E
- Construction started: 2014
- Completed: 2018
- Opened: June 15, 2018
- Cost: US$1.1 billion
- Client: Melco Resorts & Entertainment
- Owner: Melco Resorts & Entertainment

Height
- Height: 153.7 m (504 ft)

Technical details
- Material: Steel, aluminum, glass
- Floor count: 40
- Lifts/elevators: 20

Design and construction
- Architecture firm: Zaha Hadid Architects; Leigh & Orange
- Developer: Melco Resorts & Entertainment
- Structural engineer: BuroHappold Engineering
- Main contractor: Dragages Hong Kong Limited
- Awards: Prix Versailles

Other information
- Number of rooms: 781 (772 rooms, 9 villas)
- Number of restaurants: 4
- Number of bars: 2
- Facilities: Rooftop pool, spa, athletics center, art gallery, event facilities

Website
- Official website

Morpheus is a neo-futurist luxury hotel in the Chinese special administrative region of Macau that is operated by Melco Resorts & Entertainment. Opened in June 2018, TIME describes it as "the world's first free-form exoskeleton-bound high-rise: a grid of steel envelops 40 stories of glass with a fluidity inspired by Chinese jade carving." The interior has a gaming floor, a rooftop pool, a modern-art gallery, and restaurants by chefs such as Alain Ducasse.

The hotel's 772 rooms include nine two-story "sky villas," three of which have private pools. Designed by Zaha Hadid Architects and developed by Melco Resorts for USD $1.1 billion, the hotel is the first building in Asia without a singular internal column and tops out at 153.7 m (504 ft).

== History ==
Morpheus was developed by Melco Resorts & Entertainment, then Melco Crown Entertainment, as a hotel casino at the City of Dreams, a resort which "comprises four other hotels, and a variety of luxury retail, entertainment venues and casinos" in Cotai, Macau.

The hotel was described by the company as part of "phase 3" of the resort's construction, and is located on the last land parcel to be developed within the resort. Melco's chairman and CEO Lawrence Ho stated that he envisioned Morpheus as a "launchpad for a global hotel brand."

Melco Resorts & Entertainment contacted Zaha Hadid Architects (ZHA) to design the building in January 2012. Upon visiting the location, the firm found that it presented "an unusual set of challenges. First, the site offered a relatively tight 6,850 square metre (74,000 square foot) rectangular building footprint," and "the new superstructure had to be adjusted to fit a site already with foundations."

The ultimate design was inspired by Chinese jade artifacts, with a twisting exoskeleton supporting two towers and multiple skybridges. Explained the architects, "one of the initial references we used was the carving out of the jade. The idea of the exoskeleton came soon after... to be able to free as much as possible of the interior layout."

Construction on the building began in 2014. To fabricate the exoskeleton, structural steel plates were welded into unique shapes at a shipbuilding facility in Guangdong, "where workers were familiar with large, curved structures. To minimise welding on-site, the factory assembled one member with each node before transporting them by road." The name Morpheus was announced at a name-unveiling event in November 2016, at which point construction was projected to be complete in early 2018.

In 2017, it was announced that chef Alain Ducasse would be operating two of the restaurants at the hotel.

While no new gaming tables licenses were granted by the Macau government, 40 existing tables were given allowance to be transferred from other Melco properties to the hotel's VIP casino. Despite the lack of new allocations, an analyst estimated the new hotel could still "contribute up to 40 percent in revenue growth" for City of Dreams. In May 2018, Melco Resorts announced that the hotel tower would not use casino junket operators to bring in VIP clients. Ho instead asserted that the hotel would target the premium mass market, a segment comprising "big spenders that are not focused solely on gambling." The overall project cost USD $1.1 billion.

The hotel opened on June 15, 2018. For the launch, PhilStar Global writes that "two sets of elevators on each tower stopped operations to accommodate live musicians." A contemporary art gallery on the 23rd floor, Art on 23, opened its installations on June 15 as well, with participating artists such as Kaws.

Telegraph gave it a 9/10 expert rating, stating "Zaha Hadid’s design demands a new listing in architecture’s lexicon." The Times in December 2018 reviewed the hotel as "fabulously futuristic," writing that entering the lobby felt like walking onto the set of 2001: A Space Odyssey. "The vast white marble floor is blinding. In front of and behind me are gigantic walls of pale gold, tented with massive pyramids of metal pointing outwards, like an unravelled Moroccan lamp. Left and right is a fleet of glass lifts — diamond-shaped with bleeping lights — skimming up and down two towers; it is an Eighties video game made real."

Morpheus and all other Melco Resorts properties were sold out for the lunar new year holidays by January 2019.

Starting in June 2019, Morpheus' 23rd floor was made open to the public for five months for its Art Macao exhibit, with pieces by artists such as KAWS and Daniel Buren on display.

In April 2020, all 24 casino hotels operating in Macau, including Morpheus, were available for booking for the Labour Day holidays, despite lower overall booking rates in Macau due to the COVID-19 pandemic.

== Design ==
The building is 153.7 meters tall with 40 stories above ground. Designed by the firm of celebrity architect Zaha Hadid, the building is named after Morpheus, the Greek god of dreams. The building was inspired by traditional Chinese jade carving in that "no two pieces on the structure are the same." The building is constructed to allow the most light into each room as possible.

Forbes Travel Guide in February 2019 called it an "engineering masterpiece as the world’s first free-form tower sporting a complex exoskeleton."

The hotel was constructed as two towers supported by the exoskeleton, while "skybridges create three distinctive visual 'voids' or spaces. The mesh-like exoskeleton curves around these skybridges." The structural geometric grid of the exoskeleton takes on gravitational and lateral loads and reduces the need for internal columns, allowing for large open areas inside the hotel.

The first building in Asia without a singular internal column, the South China Morning Post describes two primary structural components: "Firstly, two reinforced concrete cores extend the full height of the structure. From these, the floor beams stretch to the perimeter of the building, passing over one intermediate supporting column. At the perimeter, the floor beams pass through the facade to connect with the exoskeleton." The exoskeleton is constructed from "structural steel plates, tubes and rolled sections bent or made to a specific shape by cutting and twisting plates and then welding them together in three-dimensional jigs."

The overall construction used 28,000 tons of structural steel and 538,195 m (1,765,731.63 ft) of aluminum cladding.

The aluminum exoskeleton has two layers of protective coating, "including a corrosion protection coating and an epoxy fire protection." The cladding panels "are coated with a colour-stable paint system that is baked on and binds to the surface."

The hotel includes an atrium lobby which is 35 metres (115 ft) high, while twelve "beam-me-up-Scotty, glass-sided, panoramic lifts" overlook the central atrium and are "built to travel within the building’s figure 8" and provide a view of Macau. According to the South China Morning Post, the atrium has "walls and reception bristling with white and silver faceted marble, and decorated with Hadid’s sleek white Nekton stools."

To the right of the atrium is a "domed" Morpheus lounge, and connected to the lobby are luxury boutiques stocking various lines instead of a single designer label.

Interiors of the hotel rooms were designed by Peter Remedios, also known for designing interiors at the Mandarin Oriental in Hong Kong and the Four Seasons Hotel New York. According to Remedios, the interior design "aligns with the verticals but is sympathetic to the 30- to 60-degree orientation of the exoskeleton."

The hotel's 772 rooms are a mix of standard guest rooms and suites. There are also nine invitation-only "sky villas," which according to Forbes Travel Guide, all "include 24-hour butler service and a dedicated spa treatment room. Among the nine, six have their own beauty salons and three come with private pools." The two-floor duplex villas cost around $11,000 per night. Writes the South China Morning Post, the three pool villas "take up almost an entire level of the hotel, each coming with an indoor plunge pool and entertainment room, and a private study and library, as well as a personal gym and spa."

The hotel has event facilities and casino tables, an art gallery, a gym, and the Morpheus Spa, which is reached after passing through a snow garden with simulated snow. The rooftop pool on level 40 has both indoor and outdoor connected sections. A pair of cocktail bars can be reached via the lifts in the lobby, and the hotel also has three restaurants and a pastry lounge. Zaha Hadid Architects was involved in the interior design of the restaurants on the 21st floor, as well as the Club Lounge on the 30th floor.

A French patisserie, the Morpheus Lounge, is located in the hotel lobby, with the lounge's food also available on the room service menus. The 3rd floor contains two French restaurants, one by French chef Alain Ducasse. Alain Ducasse at Morpheus serves contemporary French cuisine.

The hotel's Chinese restaurant Yi is on the skybridge of the 21st floor. Zaha Hadid Architects designed Yi with curved walls of "dragon scales" around the twelve tables, which all face the windows "to allow guests to take in the surrounding mountain and garden views" and are spaced for privacy.

Served omakase-style, the contemporary Chinese cuisine at Yi incorporates dishes from "Cantonese cuisine to Chaozhou, Sichuan to Hunan."

== See also ==
- List of tallest buildings in Macau
