= Bank of China Building, Macau =

Office building in Macau

Bank of China Building
- Chinese: 中國銀行大廈; Portuguese: Edifício do Banco da China
- Location within Macau

General information
- Status: Completed
- Type: Skyscraper
- Architectural style: Modernism
- Location: Sé, Macau, China
- Coordinates: 22.189861°N 113.542974°E
- Construction started: 1989
- Completed: 1991

Height
- Height: 163 m (535 ft)

Technical details
- Floor count: 38
- Floor area: 2,172 sq m

Design and construction
- Architect: P & T Architects & Engineers Ltd

Bank of China Building, Macau

Chinese name
- Traditional Chinese: 中國銀行大廈
- Simplified Chinese: 中国银行大厦
Transcriptions
Standard Mandarin
- Hanyu Pinyin: Zhōngguó Yínháng Dàshà
Yue: Cantonese
- Jyutping: zung1 gwok3 ngan4 hong4 daai6 haa6

Portuguese name
- Portuguese: Edifício do Banco da China

Bank of China Building (Chinese: 中國銀行大廈, Portuguese: Edifício do Banco da China) is the ninth tallest building in Macau. At 38 floors and 163 metres (535 ft) tall, it was designed by P&T Architects & Engineers Ltd and is home to the Bank of China operations in Macau. Construction started in 1989 and was completed in 1991.

== Gallery ==
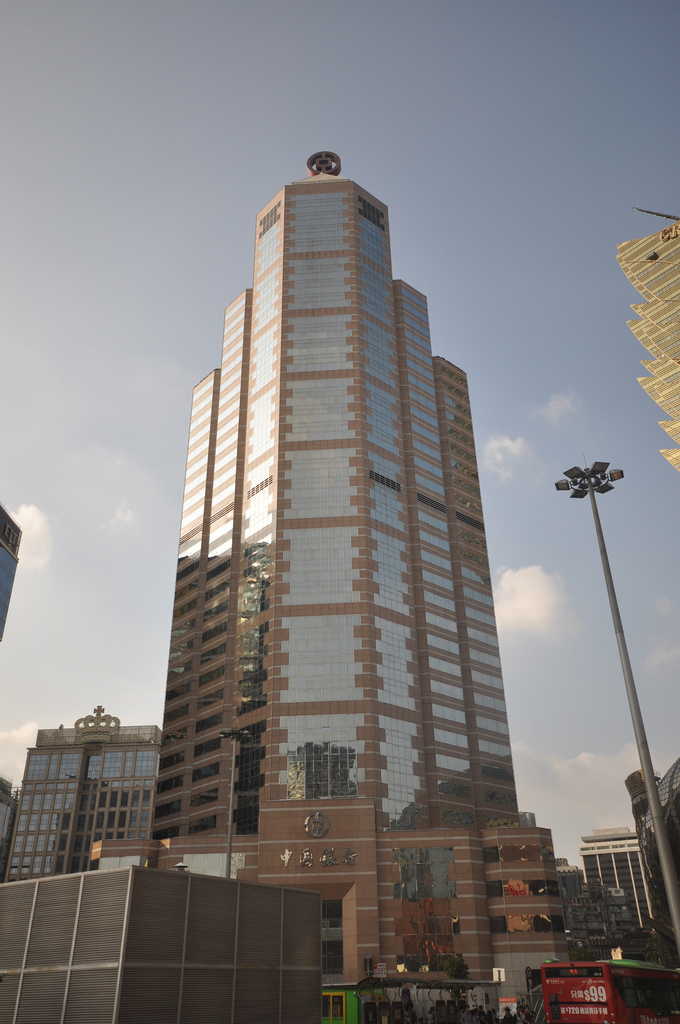
Front view of Bank of China Building in Macau

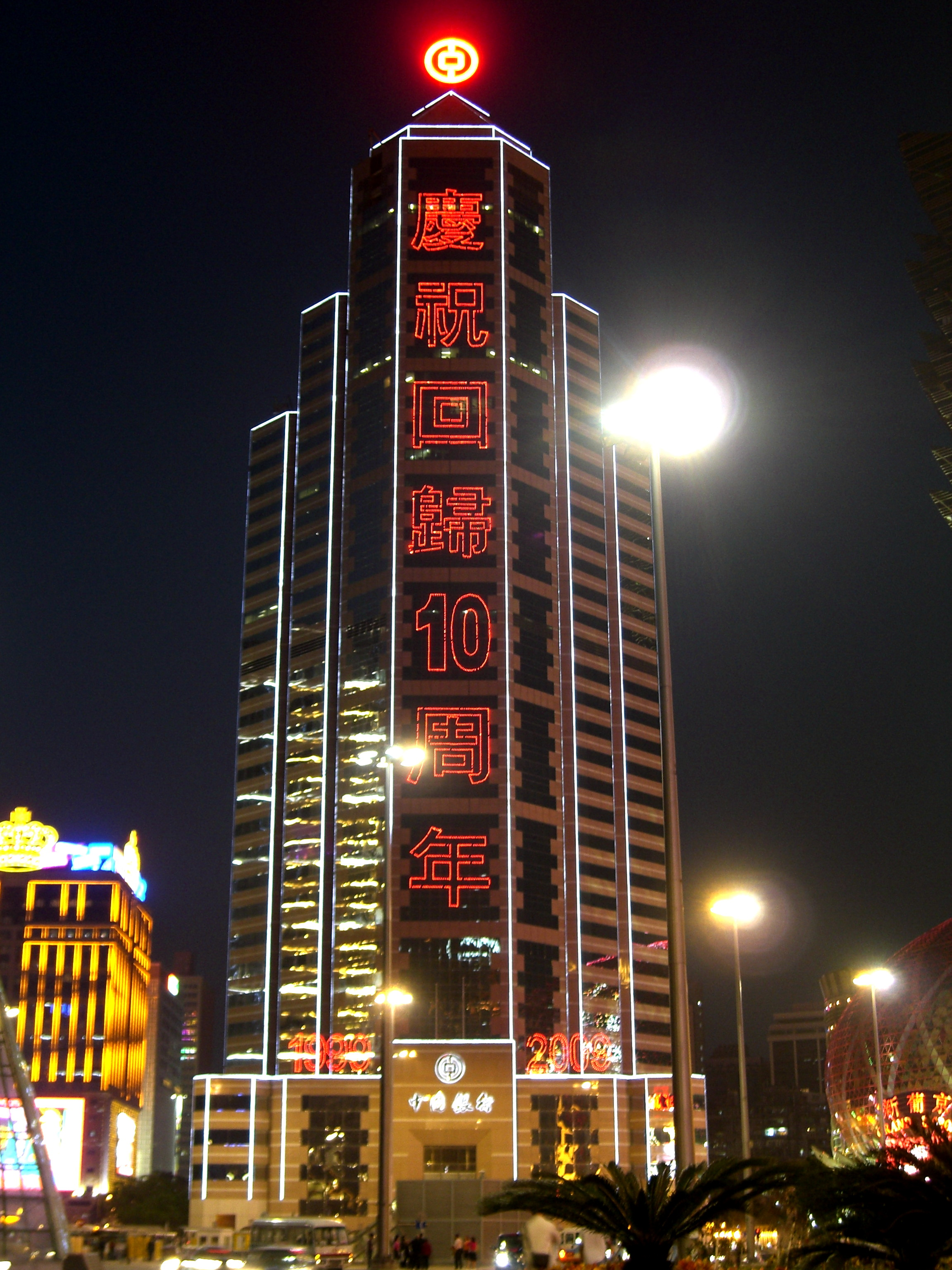

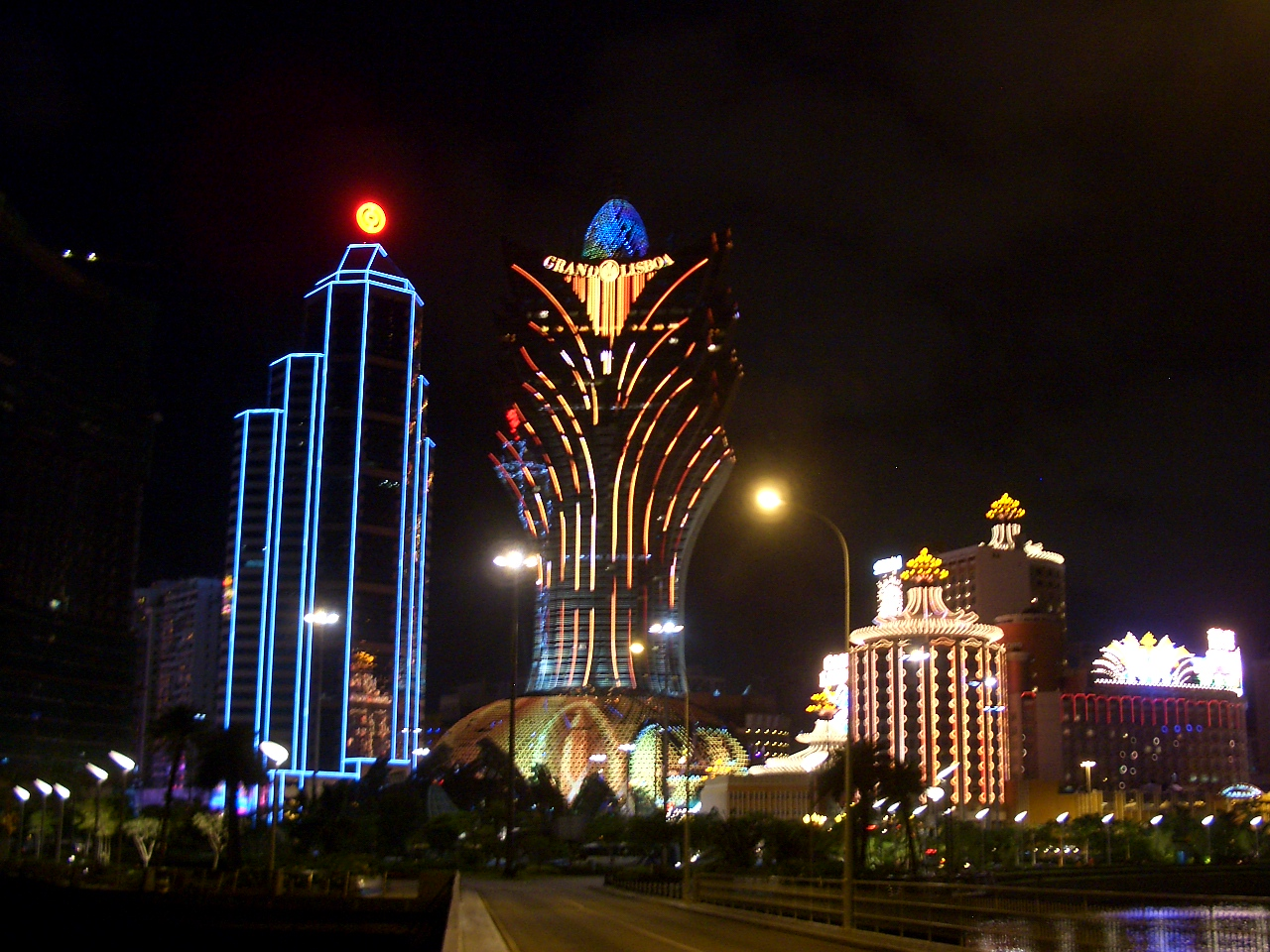
Building (left)

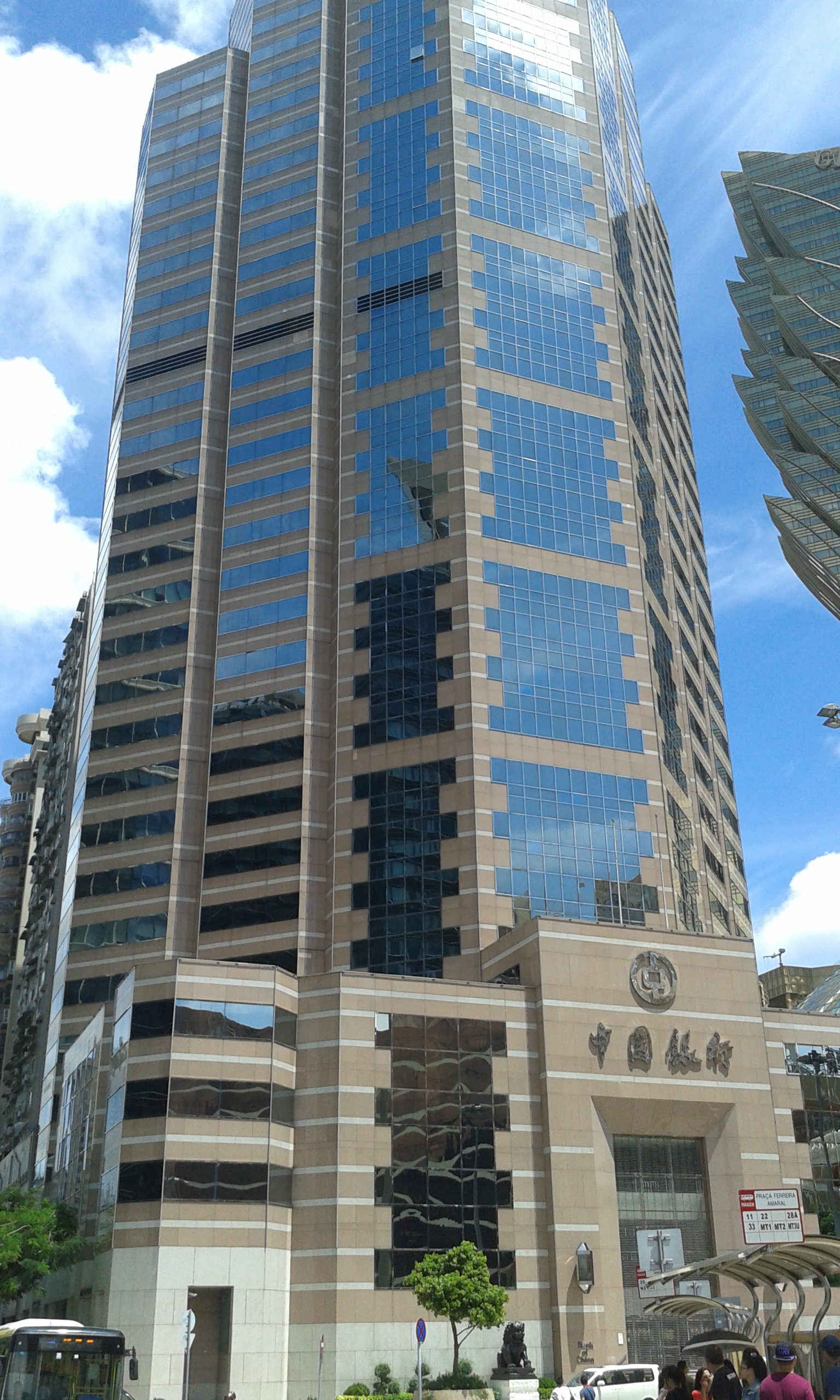

== See also ==
- List of tallest buildings in Macau
- , Bank of China (Macau)
