= Nova Park =

Building in Macau, China

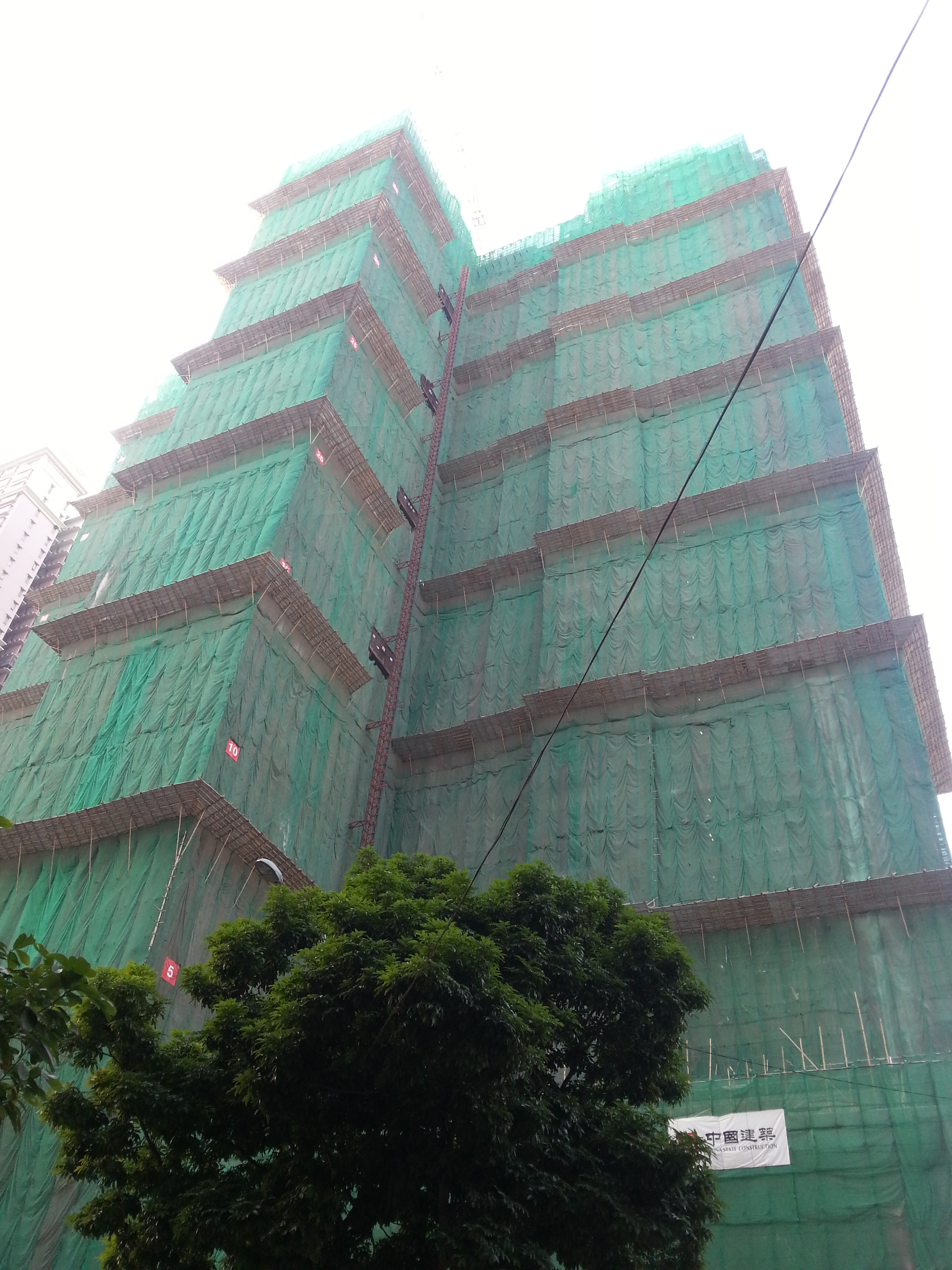
- Nova Park tower under construction in Taipa Macau

- Location within Macau
- Alternative names: 濠珀

General information
- Location: Taipa, Macau, Macau
- Coordinates: 22.15778°N 113.55581°E
- Landlord: Shun Tak Holdings Limited

Height
- Top floor: 42

The Nova Park (Chinese: 濠珀) is a property development project in Taipa, Macau.

== Location ==
Nova Park is located next to Taipa Central Park, Nova Taipa Gardens and Nova City.

== History ==
Nova Parks consists of three towers with 41 to 42 storeys offering a total of 620 units.
