= China Travel International Investment Hong Kong =

Company in Hong Kong, China

China Travel International Investment Hong Kong Limited 香港中旅国际投资有限公司
- Type: State-owned enterprise (Red chip)
- Traded as: SEHK: 308
- Industry: Conglomerate
- Founded: 1992; 34 years ago
- Headquarters: Hong Kong, People's Republic of China
- Area served: Hong Kong
- Key people: Chairman: Mr. Zhang Xuewu
- Parent: China Travel Service
- Subsidiaries: TurboJET
- Website: www.hkcts.com

China Travel International Investment Hong Kong Limited is an investment holding company engaged in travel, theme park, hotel, resort, passenger transportation, golf club, power generation, freight forwarding, and other investments. It was established and listed in Hong Kong in 1992 as a subsidiary of China Travel Service.

China Travel co-owns a joint venture with Shun Tak Holdings under the name of TurboJET, a company providing hydrofoil and high-speed ferry services between Hong Kong, Macau, Shenzhen, and Guangzhou, all located around the Pearl River Delta in southern China.
