= Shun Tak Holdings =

Macau company

Shun Tak Holdings Limited
- Native name: 信德集團有限公司
- Traded as: SEHK: 242
- Industry: Shipping; Property; Hospitality; Investments
- Founded: 1972
- Founder: Stanley Ho
- Headquarters: Shun Tak Centre, Hong Kong
- Subsidiaries: TurboJET
- Website: www.shuntakgroup.com

Shun Tak Holdings
- Traditional Chinese: 信德集團有限公司
- Simplified Chinese: 信德集团有限公司
Transcriptions
Standard Mandarin
- Hanyu Pinyin: Xìndé jítuán yǒuxiàngōngsī
- Wade–Giles: Hsin-tê Chi-tʻuan Yu-hsien kung-ssŭ
Yue: Cantonese
- Jyutping: seon3 dak1 zaap6 tyun4 jau5 haan6 gung1 si1

Shun Tak Holdings Limited (Chinese: 信德集團有限公司) is a Hong Kong–Macau company founded in 1972. It has been one of the constituents of the Hang Seng Hong Kong MidCap Index since 11 September 2006. The company is active in shipping, property, hospitality, and investments businesses. Its shipping division, operating under the name of TurboJET, operates hydrofoil and high-speed ferry services between Hong Kong and Macau as a joint venture with China Travel International Investment Hong Kong.

The company's founder and executive chairman is Stanley Ho. His daughter Pansy Ho serves as managing director with two of his other daughters, Daisy Ho Chiu-fung and Maisy Ho Chiu-ha, as executive directors along with David Shum.

== History ==
Until late 2010, Stanley Ho controlled the company. An 11.55 per cent stake in Shun Tak was transferred by Ho to Hanika Realty, a company controlled by second wife Lucina Laam and his five children with her. The transfer made Hanika Shun Tak's biggest single shareholder.

In April 2015, Shun Tak Holdings Ltd purchased a hotel property in Shanghai for RMB700 million (MOP900 million).

In January 2017, Shun Tak acquired a Singapore commercial complex for US$246.75 million.

== Business operations ==
The company has extensive shipping and property holdings. Shipping companies owned include: Conwick Investment Ltd; Far East Hydrofoil Company Ltd; Hong Kong Macao Hydrofoil Company Ltd; Sunrise Field Ltd; Tai Tak Hing Shipping Company Ltd (the then independent company that owned the steamship ferry SS Fatshan, which sank off Lantau in Typhoon Rose in 1971 with the loss of 88 lives, en route from Macau); Wealth Trump Ltd; Shun Tak–China Travel Macau Ferries Ltd (formerly known as Hong Kong–Macau New World First Ferry Services (Macau) Ltd); and Companhia de Serviços de Ferry STCT (Macau) (formerly known as New Ferry - Transporte Maritimo de Passageiros (Macau)).

=== Residential Properties in Macau ===
Property Name	Location	Residential Units	Construction Completed In	Nos. of Floors	Height
Nova Taipa Gardens	Taipa, Macau	tbc	1997	27	86.26 m
Nova City	Taipa, Macau	1,932	2008	36	109.8 m
Nova Park	Taipa, Macau	tbc	scheduled 2014	42	tbc
