= China Travel Service =

Chinese state-owned travel agency

China Tourism Group Corporation Limited

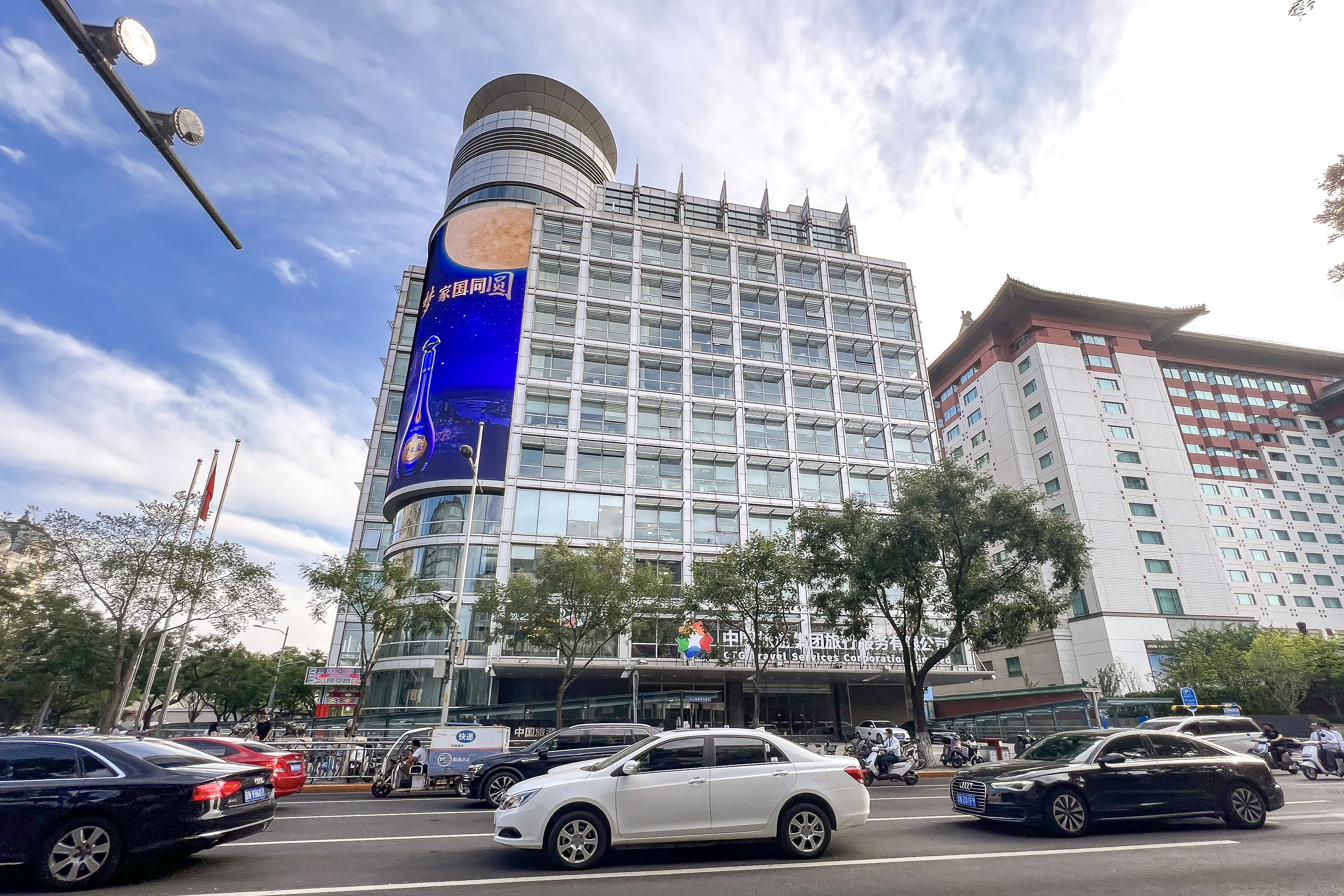
- Building in Beijing
- Trade name: China Travel Service
- Native name: 中国旅游集团
- Type: Public
- Traded as: SSE: 601888
- Founded: October 1985
- Headquarters: Haikou, Hainan, China
- Subsidiaries: China Travel International Investment Hong Kong
- Website: ctg.cn

China Travel Service, also known as China Tourism Group Corporation Limited, (CTG; 中国旅游集团) is a state-owned tourism company headquartered in Haikou, Hainan, China.

The corporation was established on 19 November 1949 with the goal of marketing China to the rest of the world and promoting tourism. It is a subordinate agency to the National Tourism Administration and a parent organization of China Travel International Investment Hong Kong.

China Travel Service
- Simplified Chinese: 中国旅行社总社
- Traditional Chinese: 中國旅行社總社
Transcriptions
Standard Mandarin
- Hanyu Pinyin: Zhōngguó Lǚxíngshè Zǒngshè
- Wade–Giles: Chung-kuo Lü-hsing-she Tsung-she

== Controversies ==
During the 2019–2020 Hong Kong protests, China Travel Service data was allegedly used to publish to personal information on HKLeaks, a doxxing website that targeted supporters of the protest movement.

== See also ==
- Tourism in China
