= TurboJET =

Hong Kong ferry operator

TurboJET 噴射飛航
IATA	ICAO	Call sign
8S	—	—
- Founded: 1962
- Commenced operations: 1962
- Hubs: Hong Kong International Airport (Skypier)
- Fleet size: 30
- Destinations: 3 (routes to/from Hong Kong International Airport only)
- Parent company: Shun Tak Holdings; China Travel International Investment Hong Kong
- Headquarters: Hong Kong
- Website: www.turbojet.com.hk

Shun Tak–China Travel Ship Management Limited

Chinese name
- Traditional Chinese: 信德中旅船務管理有限公司
- Simplified Chinese: 信德中旅船务管理有限公司
Transcriptions
Standard Mandarin
- Hanyu Pinyin: Xìndé zhōnglǚ chuánwù guǎnlǐ yǒuxiàn gōngsī
Yue: Cantonese
- Yale Romanization: Seundāk jūngléuih syùnmouh gúnléih yáuhhaahn gūngsī
- Jyutping: Seon3dak1 zung1leoi5 syun4mou6 gun2lei5 jau5haan6 gung1si1
- IPA: [sɵ̄n tɐ́k̚ tsóŋ lɵ̬y sy̏ːn mòu kǔːn le̬i jɐ̬u hàːn kóŋ síː]

Portuguese name
- Portuguese: Shun Tak China Travel – Companhia de Gestão de Embarcações, Limitada: "TurboJET"

English name
- English: Shun Tak–China Travel Ship Management Limited: "TurboJET"

TurboJET
- Traditional Chinese: 噴射飛航
- Simplified Chinese: 喷射飞航
Transcriptions
Standard Mandarin
- Hanyu Pinyin: Pēnshè Fēiháng
Yue: Cantonese
- Yale Romanization: Panseh fēihòng
- Jyutping: pan3 se6 fei1 hong4

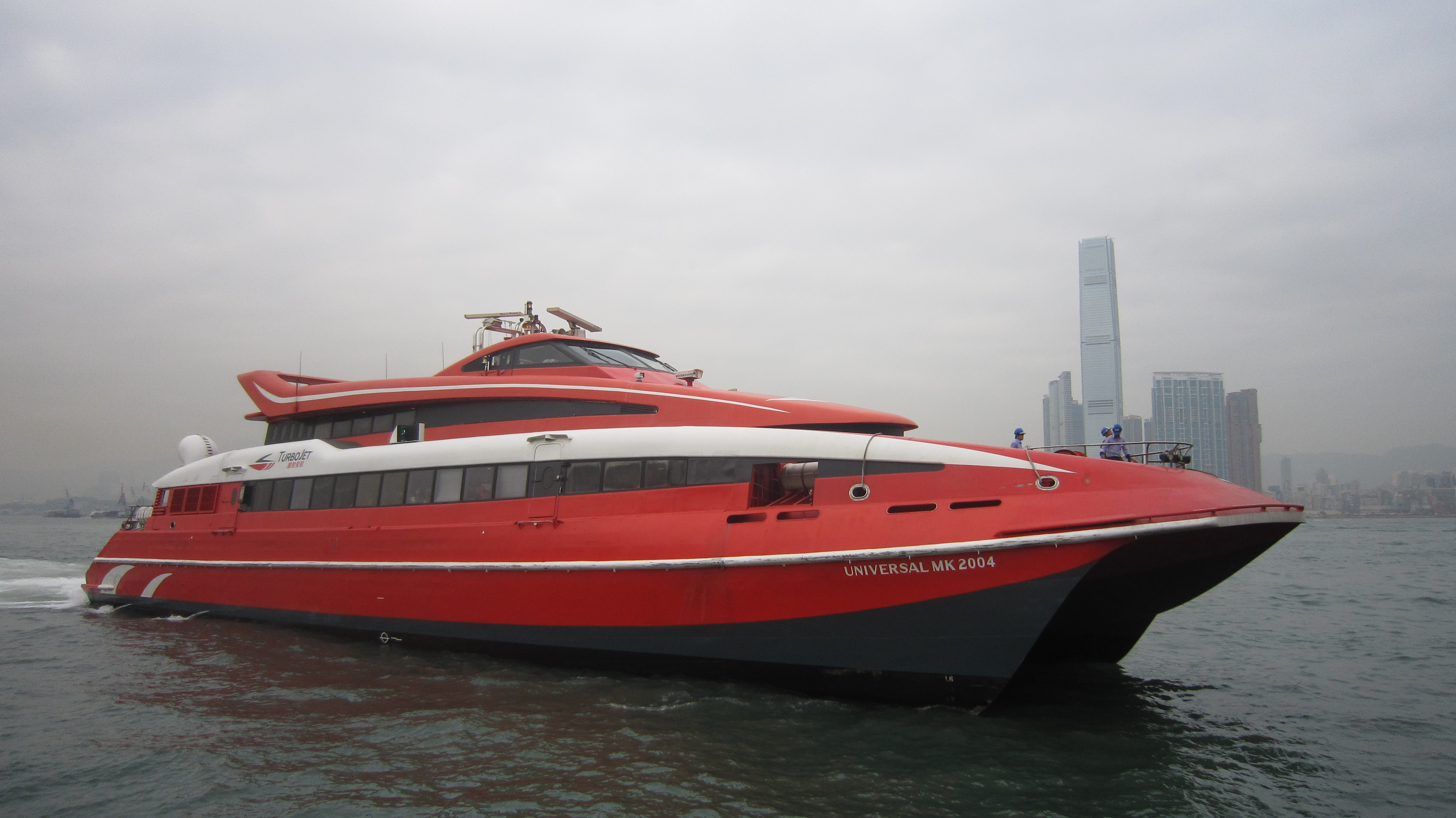
TurboJET's Universal MK 2004 TriCat

Shun Tak–China Travel Ship Management Limited, doing business as TurboJET (Chinese: 噴射飛航), is a ferry company based in Hong Kong. The company was established from the joint venture between Shun Tak Holdings and China Travel International Investment Hong Kong in July 1999. It operates hydrofoil and high-speed ferry services between Hong Kong, Macau, Shenzhen, and Zhuhai in the Pearl River Delta area.

TurboJET is one of the two companies operating high-speed ferry services between Hong Kong and Macau – the other one being Cotai Water Jet. TurboJET uses the IATA two-letter airline code 8S only for routes to and from Hong Kong International Airport. For other routes, it uses other codes instead e.g. J0, J1, TP, etc., depending on the flight time and destination.

== History ==
Shun Tak and China Travel had their own separate ferry business brands before merging as TurboJET on 1 July 1999. They were Far East Hydrofoil by Shun Tak, and Turbo Cat by CTS Parkview Company Ltd.

It acquired New Ferry – Transporte Marítimo de Passageiros Limitada (abbreviated New World First Ferry (Macau)) from NWS Holdings for HK$350 million on 11 August 2011, and completed the transaction on 30 September.

Since the opening of the Hong Kong–Zhuhai–Macau Bridge in October 2018, passenger numbers have been falling sharply due to the direct competition. The ferry service was deemed too slow and expensive. Since 2019, TurboJET started gradually cutting frequencies adjusting to the passenger numbers with the anti-extradition bill protests in Hong Kong as well as the COVID-19 pandemic.

== Routes ==
TurboJET provides services between Hong Kong, Hong Kong International Airport, Macau, Shenzhen, and Guangzhou, all located around the Pearl River Delta in southern China. The route between Hong Kong and Macau is the busiest, taking approximately one hour to travel the 70 kilometres (43 mi) journey on TurboJET's high-speed vessels.

In the past, besides the inter-city routes, Turbo Cat operated Hong Kong out-lying routes during the years 1999 to 2000. The routes were Central to Tuen Mun (on weekdays), and Central to Tai O (on weekends). After the merger, the routes were operated under the TurboJET brand.

== Fleet ==
TurboJET was the world's largest operator of Boeing's Jetfoils; all used to belong to the former Far East Hydrofoil, which also used PS-30 and FoilCat. The former Turbo Cat used Flying Cat and TriCat.

TurboJET's fleet includes seven major types of vessels (and eight minor vessels), with one of the major types (and two minor types) rented from another company.

=== Bought vessels ===
- FoilCat: 35 m length, 561 tonnes, 423 passengers catamaran hydrofoil. Propelled by waterjets powered by twin General Electric LM500 gas turbines. Maximum speed at 50 knots. Built by Kvaerner Fjellstrand of Norway.
- Flying Cat: 40m length, 479 tonnes, 303/406 passengers catamaran. Propelled by waterjets powered by twin MTU 16V 396 diesel engines, rated at 2000 kW each. Cruising speed at 35 knots. Built by Kvaerner Fjellstrand of Norway for Universal MK I and Universal MK III, and Damen Shipyard of the Netherlands for Universal MK V. All three vessels are inactive as of 2025.
- TriCat: 45 m length, 602 tonnes, 328/333 passengers catamaran. Propelled by waterjets powered by twin Caterpillar Solar Taurus gas turbines. Cruising speed at 45 knots, capable of 52 knots when empty. Built by FBM Marine of the United Kingdom for Universal MK 2001–2007, FBM–Aboitiz Shipyard of the Philippines for Universal MK 2008, and Pequot River Shipworks of the United States for Universal MK 2009–2010. (Note: Universal MK 2001–2005 are installed with 2 shorter chimneys at the back of the vessels, while Universal MK 2006–2010 are installed with two higher chimneys.)
- Jetfoil: 24.44 m length, 267 tonnes, 190/243 passengers monohull hydrofoil. Propelled by waterjets powered by twin Rolls-Royce Allison 501KF gas turbines. Maximum speed at 45 knots. Built by the Boeing Company of the United States.
- PS-30: 27.8 m length, 303 tonnes, 260 passengers Jetfoil-like monohull hydrofoil. Propelled by waterjets powered by twin Rolls-Royce Allison 501KF gas turbines. Maximum speed at 45 knots. Built by Shanghai Simno Marine Limited under licenses from Boeing. (Note: This vessel is currently inactive as of September 2011.)
- Austal 48m: 47.5 m length, 610 tonnes, 414/418 passengers catamaran. Propelled by waterjets powered by quadruple MTU 16V 4000 diesel engines, rated at 2320 kW each. Cruising speed at 43.5 knots, capable of 49 knots when empty. Built by Austal Shipyard of Australia.

=== Rented vessels (returned in December 2008) ===
- Wavemaster SuperFast 39m: 39m length, 300 passengers catamaran. Propelled by waterjets powered by twin MTU 8V 396 diesel engines, rated at 1580 kW each. Maximum speed at 36 knots. Built by Wavemaster International Proprietary Limited Company of Australia.
- Wavemaster SuperFast 42m: 42m length, 385 passengers catamaran. Propelled by waterjets powered by twin MTU 16V 396 diesel engines, rated at 1960 kW each. Maximum speed at 48 knots. Built by Wavemaster International Proprietary Limited Company of Australia.

=== Vessels information ===
Active TurboJET Fleet
Name	IMO	Type	Year Built	Seats	Builder	Notes	Image
Universal MK 2002 (宇航2002)	9087568	TriCat	1995	333	FBM Marine Limited		Universal MK 2002
Universal MK 2003 (宇航2003)	9087570	TriCat	1995	331	FBM Marine Limited	Vessel involved in collision with fishing vessel near Lung Sou Gok in August 2016	Universal MK 2003
Universal MK 2004 (宇航2004)	9087582	TriCat	1995	331	FBM Marine Limited		Universal MK 2004
Universal MK 2005 (宇航2005)	9087594	TriCat	1996	331	FBM Marine Limited	Repainted in modern livery, later in UnionPay livery, crashed in May 2025 at Macau Ferry Terminal due to a mechanical fault but is now repaired	Universal MK 2005
Universal MK 2006 (宇航2006)	9139206	TriCat	1996	331	FBM Marine Limited		Universal MK 2006
Universal MK 2007 (宇航2007)	9139218	TriCat	1996	333	FBM Marine Limited	Painted in Mastercard livery since 2018	Universal MK 2007
Universal MK 2017 (宇航2017)	9323211	Austal 48m	2004	418	Austal Shipyard	Originally purchased by First Ferry (Macau) as New Ferry LXXXVIII; sold to TurboJET before the launch of First Ferry (Macau)	Universal MK 2017

Inactive or former TurboJET Fleet
Name	IMO	Type	Year Built	Seats	Builder	Notes	Image
Penha (祥星)	9101778	FoilCat	1995	377	Kvaerner Fjellstrand Shipyard	Upgraded to Premier Status in February 2015, currently inactive and parked at Stonecutters Shipyard as of October 2026	Penha
Terceira (錫星, 929-115-012)	7910008	Jetfoil	1979	190	Boeing Company	2nd Premier Jetfoil in service since February 2010; repainted in modern livery in 2015; parked at Stonecutters Shipyard since November 2025 upon the expiration of its license; whether she is retired or not is still undecided	Terceira
Açores (恆星, 929-100-008)	7933189	Jetfoil	1977	262	Boeing Company	Sold to South Korea in 2004 (renamed as Kobee III), now retired	
Horta (海皇星, 929-115-016)	7923251	Jetfoil	1980	200	Boeing Company	3rd Premier Jetfoil in service since July 2012, crashed in October 2015 injuring 121 but was repaired, retired in January 2021 and scrapped in March 2026	Horta
Lilau (帝皇星, 929-115-014)	8332332	Jetfoil	1979	202	Boeing Company	Formerly served the Royal Navy as HMS Speedy (P296), retired in September 2019 and scrapped in July 2021. The only Boeing 929-115 that was never converted to a Premier Jetfoil	Lilau
Funchal (天皇星, 929-115-013)	7923249	Jetfoil	1979	190	Boeing Company	1st Premier Jetfoil in service since March 2009 after a crash in November 2008, often appeared in TurboJET's Premier Jetfoil promotional materials since then, retired and scrapped in May 2025	
Taipa (帝后星, 929-115-021)	8127701	Jetfoil	1981	202	Boeing Company	4th Premier Jetfoil in service since February 2013, retired and scrapped in November 2025	
Cacilhas (幸運星, 929-115-018)	8019564	Jetfoil	1981	202	Boeing Company	8th Premier Jetfoil in service since July 2014 after a beaching incident in June 2014 injuring 70. She also caught fire in October 2015 but was repaired, parked at Stonecutters shipyard as of October 2026	Cacilhas
São Jorge (銀星, 929-100-006)	7933165	Jetfoil	1976	202	Boeing Company	Originally parked since 2008, but was returned to service in October 2014 to replaced the damaged Madeira. 6th Premier Jetfoil in service since late 2014, retired in 2021 and scrapped in May 2025. The only Boeing 929-100 to be converted to a Premier Jetfoil	São Jorge
Santa Maria (金星, 929-100-005)	7523910	Jetfoil	1975	243	Boeing Company	Retired in August 2019 and scrapped in March 2021, making it the first Jetfoil scrapped	Santa Maria
Urzela (鐵星, 929-100-007)	7932898	Jetfoil	1976	243	Boeing Company	Retired in December 2018 and scrapped in April 2021	Urzela
Guia (東星, 929-100-009)	7932848	Jetfoil	1977	243	Boeing Company	Formerly Okesa of Sado Kisen. Repainted in modern livery; retired in July 2018 and scrapped in April 2021	Guia
Corvo (火星, 929-100-003)	7731555	Jetfoil	1975	242	Boeing Company	Originally as Kamehameha for SeaFlite (Pacific Sea Transportation Ltd.) in 1975; sold to South Korea in 2006 (renamed as Hijet), now retired	
Pico (土星, 929-100-004)	7737391	Jetfoil	1975	243	Boeing Company	Originally planned to be the 9th Premier Jetfoil, but was retired in February 2018 and scrapped in May 2021	Pico
Madeira (木星, 929-100-002)	7523881	Jetfoil	1975	243	Boeing Company	Crashed in November 2013 injuring 87 and has since been retired. Scrapped in February 2026 after being parked for 12 years	Madeira
Flores (水星, 929-100-001)	7737389	Jetfoil	1975	243	Boeing Company	Formerly Jetfoil One; parked since 2008 and was planned to be scrapped in October 2020, but work was suspended due to pressure from multiple organizations. Unfortunately she was still scrapped 6 years later despite strong public opposition. Following Flores' scrapping, no more Boeing 929-100 Jetfoils exist in the world	
Ponta Delgada (銅星, 929-100-008)	7932903	Jetfoil	1978	242	Boeing Company	Sold to South Korea in 2004 (renamed as Kobee V), now retired	
Barca (日星)	9101780	FoilCat	1995	378	Kvaerner Fjellstrand Shipyard	Upgraded to Premier Status in May 2014, inactive since June 2024 due to a lack of parts. Parked at Stonecutters shipyard as of November 2026	Barca
Universal MK I (宇航壹號)	9060376	Flying Cat	1992	303	Kvaerner Fjellstrand Shipyard	Currently inactive, parked at Stonecutter shipyard as of January 2026	Universal MK I
Universal MK II (宇航貳號)	9060388	Flying Cat	1993	303	Kvaerner Fjellstrand Shipyard	Sold to Indonesia in 2010 (renamed as Prima Oasis)	
Universal MK III (宇航叄號)	9060390	Flying Cat	1993	303	Kvaerner Fjellstrand Shipyard	Repainted in modern livery, currently inactive and parked at Stonecutters shipyard as of November 2026	Universal MK III
Universal MK IV (宇航肆號)	9086655	Flying Cat	1994	303	Kvaerner Fjellstrand Shipyard	Sold to South Korea in August 2011 (renamed as Namhan Angel)	
Universal MK V (宇航五號)	9236872	Flying Cat	2000	406	Damen Shipyard	Originally purchased by First Ferry (Macau) as New Ferry V, currently inactive and parked at Stonecutters shipyard as of December 2025	Universal MK V
Balsa (北星)	8878362	PS-30	1994	270	Shanghai Simno Marine Limited	Originally supposed to be sold alongside Praia, but the deal fell through in the end. Parked since November 2008 and was scrapped in September 2020	
Praia (南星)	9143960	PS-30	1994	242	Shanghai Simno Marine Limited	Sold to South Korea in 2002 (renamed as Kobee) and scrapped in 2021	
Universal MK 2001 (宇航2001)	9087556	TriCat	1994	331	FBI Marine Limited	Currently inactive	Universal MK 2001
Universal MK 2008 (宇航2008)	9139220	TriCat	1996	331	FBM–Aboitiz Shipyard, Philippines	Currently inactive	Universal MK 2008
Universal MK 2009 (宇航2009)	9160188	TriCat	1998	328	Pequot River Shipworks, New London, Connecticut, US	Second hand (joined in 2005); painted in MGM Macau livery until 2017, then repainted in standard livery, painted in Mastercard livery since 2018, currently inactive	Universal MK 2009
Universal MK 2010 (宇航2010)	9182538	TriCat	1999	328	Pequot River Shipworks, New London, Connecticut, US	Second hand (joined in 2005); currently inactive and parked at Stonecutters shipyard as of October 2026	Universal MK 2010
Universal MK 2011 (宇航201)	9444209	Austal 48m	2008	418	Austal Shipyard	Originally purchased by First Ferry (Macau) as New Ferry LXXXVII; sold to TurboJET before the launch of First Ferry (Macau), currently inactive and parked at Stonecutters shipyard as of November 2026	Universal MK 2011
Universal MK 2012 (宇航2012)	9433676	Austal 48m	2008	418	Austal Shipyard	Originally purchased by First Ferry (Macau) as New Ferry LXXXVIII; sold to TurboJET before the launch of First Ferry (Macau), currently inactive and parked at Stonecutters shipyard as of November 2026	Universal MK 2012
Universal MK 2013 (宇航2013)	9259525	Austal 48m	2002	414	Austal Shipyard	Originally purchased by First Ferry (Macau) as New Ferry LXXXI, currently inactive and parked at Stonecutters shipyard as of December 2025	Universal MK 2013
Universal MK 2014 (宇航2014)	9259537	Austal 48m	2002	414	Austal Shipyard	Originally purchased by First Ferry (Macau) as New Ferry LXXXII, currently inactive	Universal MK 2014
Universal MK 2015 (宇航2015)	9259549	Austal 48m	2002	414	Austal Shipyard	Originally purchased by First Ferry (Macau) as New Ferry LXXXIII, sold to Turkey in 2025 (renamed as Naim Tugay)	Universal MK 2015
Universal MK 2016 (宇航2016)	9323209	Austal 48m	2004	418	Austal Shipyard	Originally purchased by First Ferry (Macau) as New Ferry LXXXV, sold to Turkey in 2025 (renamed as Tayyar Tugay)	Universal MK 2016
