= StarWorld Hotel =

Hotel in Macau, China

- 星际酒店 (Yue Chinese); Mundo de Estrelas (Portuguese)
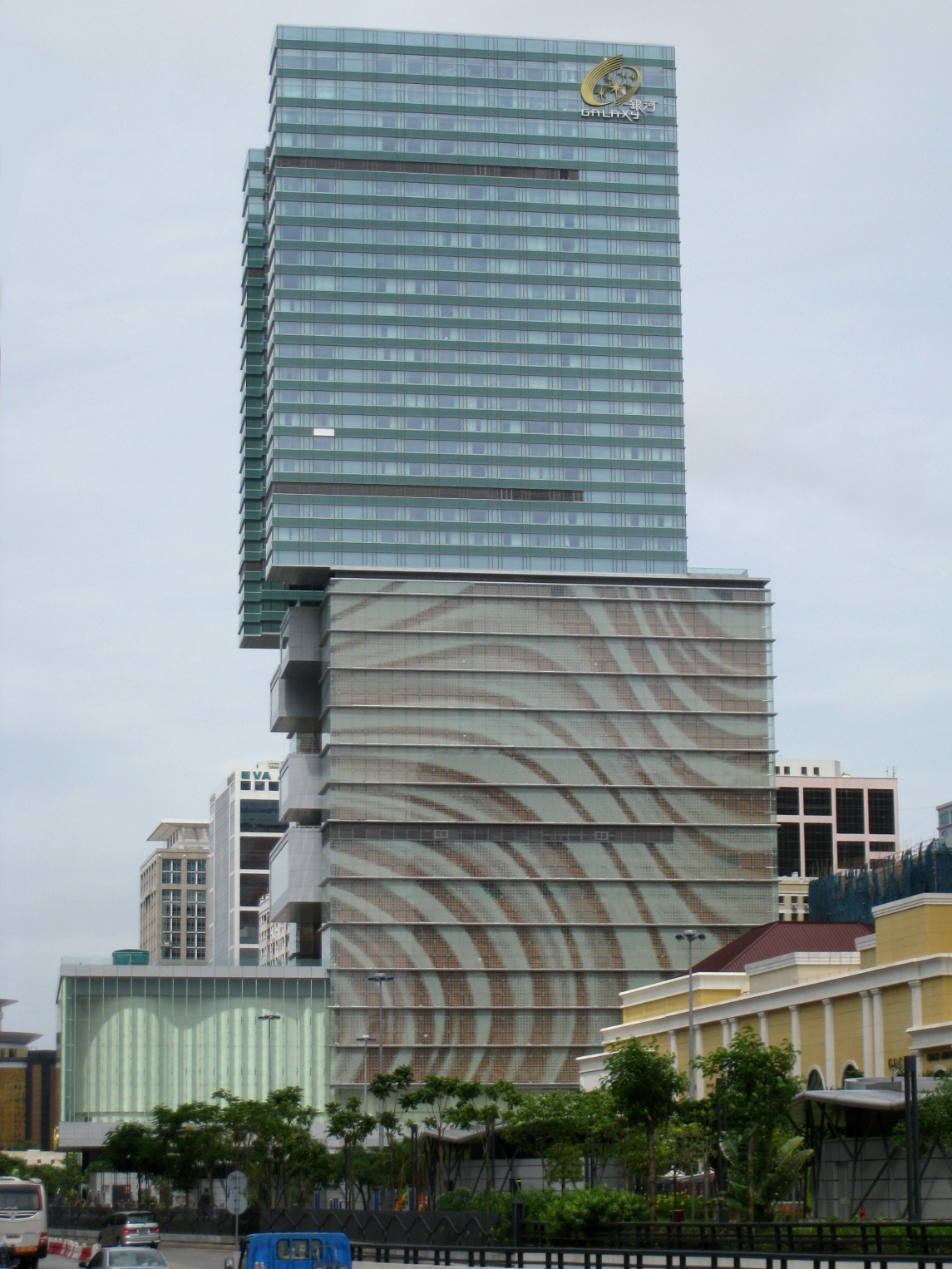

General information
- Status: Completed
- Type: Hotel, casino
- Location: Plot A2/i, Xiandeli Street, Avenida da Amizade, Sé, Macau
- Coordinates: 22.18974°N 113.54801°E
- Completed: 2006

Height
- Roof: 161.8 m (531 ft)

Technical details
- Structural system: Reinforced concrete
- Floor count: 36

Design and construction
- Architect: Rocco Design Architects
- Developer: K. Wah International
- Other information
- Theme: Time perception
- No. of rooms: 371
- Notable restaurants: Lobby Lounge; Treasure Trove; Dan Gui Xuan; Su Zhe Hui; Dao Ju Japanese Cuisine; Taste Bar; Ju Xing Lang Banquet Hall
- Casino type: Land-based
- Operating license holder: Galaxy Entertainment
- Website: Official website

StarWorld Hotel (Chinese: 星际酒店 or Hotel Mundo de Estrelas) is a luxury hotel and casino resort in Sé, Macau. Built in 2006, the complex consists of one main tower standing at 161.8 m (531 ft) tall with 36 floors which is the 28th tallest building in Macau.

== History ==
The resort is located on Avenida da Amizade in Macau's New Port area. A 3 billion pataca project invested in by Galaxy Entertainment Group, it opened on October 19, 2006. The 38-story building has a total floor area of 1.29 million square feet. Designed by Hong Kong architect Rocco Yim, with interior design by Lee Siu Design, it includes a hotel, restaurants, a casino, and a leisure and entertainment center. At its opening, StarWorld Hotel was Macau's tallest five-star hotel, offering a one-stop shop for tourism, entertainment, and leisure services.

StarWorld Hotel invited Hong Kong celebrity Tony Leung Chiu-wai to be its spokesperson, and he filmed two promotional advertisements and served as the opening ribbon-cutting guest. It is rumored that he signed the contract for a fee of tens of millions of dollars. His spokesperson contract ended at the end of 2008 after two years.

== Facilities ==
=== Casino ===
The StarWorld Hotel's casino (on the first and third floors) features two massive 10-meter-high gaming halls and a VIP floor, covering an area of 140,000 square feet. It boasts nearly 290 gaming tables (offering baccarat, Caribbean poker, blackjack, roulette, and sic bo among other games) and 371 slot machines. The hotel's 10th floor houses the VIP casino, "Golden Gate Elite Club." At its opening, the main hall featured Asia's largest indoor LED electronic display screen, but after several renovations between late 2007 and 2008, the screen was reduced to half its original size.

Starting in mid-May 2009, the casino on the first floor underwent a phased comprehensive upgrade and was scheduled to reopen in August, with the name "New StarWorld" as its selling point. Rumors circulated that this change involved the casino business and even a potential sale of the entire StarWorld Hotel.

=== Hotel ===
The StarWorld Hotel's interior design blends traditional Chinese culture, and to align with its Eastern brand image, it has specially invited renowned actor Tony Leung to be its brand ambassador. It houses a total of 507 guest rooms and suites, including two luxury 6,000-square-foot sky suites. The hotel also boasts numerous restaurants, entertainment venues, and shops. Additional amenities include a spa, a health sauna, karaoke hubs, gaming hubs, nightclub, a gym, and a rooftop infinity pool on the 17th floor.

== Controversies ==
On August 30, 2007, a Hong Kong resident was gambling at the StarWorld Casino. During the gambling session, the slot machine in front of her displayed the information that she had won HK$40 million (according to the resident) and HK$42,946,400.96 (according to the government). The casino said that the machine was broken and the winnings would not be awarded. The next day, she complained to the Hong Kong SAR government. On September 15, 2007, the Gaming Inspection and Coordination Bureau publicly ruled several responses. There was no evidence that she had placed a bet there; the machine was malfunctioning at the time; the appearance of that huge amount was caused by a betting accident (the person who made the bet was not specified); the reward information on the screen at the time was incorrect; and her claim was completely unsuccessful.

There were rumors online that the building might tilt due to its poor foundation, which would prevent it from opening on time. It opened as scheduled, but problems did occur; three months later, a crack about 75 meters long and about three inches deep appeared in the ground outside the building, and nearby residential and commercial buildings also collapsed.

== See also ==
- List of tallest buildings in Macau
