= City of Dreams Macau =

Casino resort in Cotai, Macau

Coordinates: 22°8′59″N 113°33′58″E

- 新濠天地 (Yue Chinese)
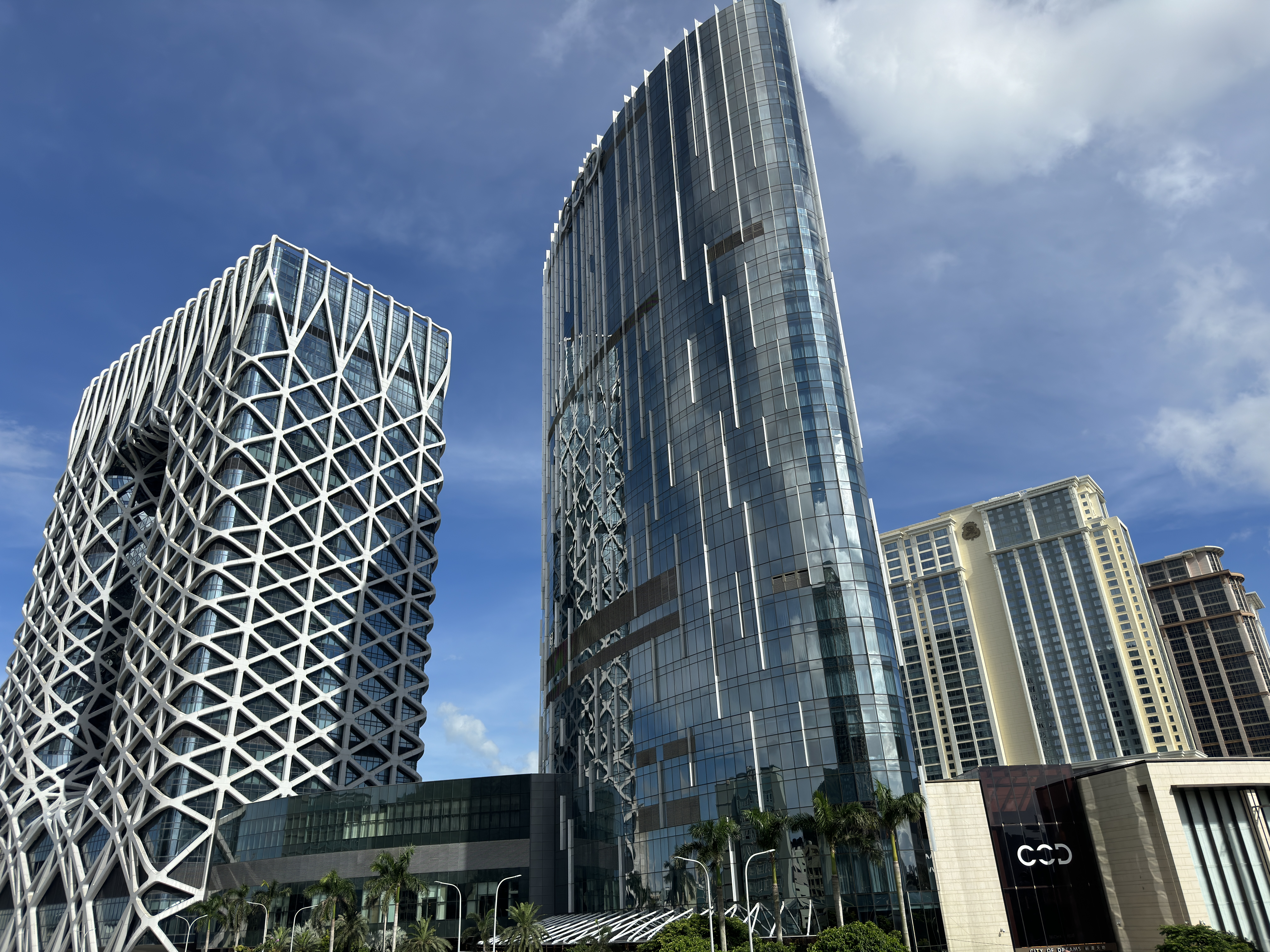
- The resort in 2024
- Interactive map of City of Dreams
- Location: Cotai, Macau; Estrada do Istmo
- Opened: 1 June 2009; 17 years ago
- Theme: Contemporary, futuristic
- No. of rooms: ~2,270
- Gaming space: 420,000 square feet (39,000 m^{2})
- Permanent shows: House of Dancing Water
- Signature attractions: Dancing Water Theatre
- Casino type: Land-based American-styled casino
- Owner: Melco Resorts & Entertainment
- Architect: Arquitectonica; Leigh & Orange; Jon Jerde; Zaha Hadid Architects
- Website: City of Dreams Macau

City of Dreams Macau
- Chinese: 新濠天地
Transcriptions
Standard Mandarin
- Hanyu Pinyin: Xīnháo Tiāndì
Yue: Cantonese
- Jyutping: san1 hou4 tin1 dei6

City of Dreams (Chinese: 新濠天地) is a casino resort in Cotai, Macau. Built, owned and managed by Melco Resorts & Entertainment, the resort, also known as CoD or CoD Macau, opened on 1 June 2009. Described as a "mega-casino" by The Guardian, in 2020 City of Dreams was the third-largest casino in the world. In total the property comprises three separate casinos, four hotels, around 1,980 total hotel rooms, over 30 restaurants and bars, and 175,000 square feet (16,300 m^{2}) of retail space.

== History ==
=== 2003–2009: Development and opening ===
The resort was commissioned and developed in Macau by Melco Crown Entertainment, a joint venture of Melco Resorts & Entertainment and Crown Entertainment. With construction lasting six years, City of Dreams was one of the few gaming developments in Macau to continue construction during the 2008 financial crisis. Total costs came to US$2.4 billion. Shortly before the 2009 grand opening, City of Dreams was the title sponsor for Matthew Marsh in the 2008 Macau Guia race. The first phase of City of Dreams, including the Hard Rock Hotel and the Crown Towers, opened on June 1, 2009. Upon opening, the resort included a 420,000-square-foot casino, 500 gambling tables, a mall, and restaurants. It was the first casino to open in Macau in almost two years after the Venetian Macao, and was Macau's second-largest casino complex. Opening attractions included a bubble fountain and dome theater featuring multimedia productions based on Chinese mythology. At the resort's entrance, four video walls at 61 feet (19 m) wide and 22 feet (6.7 m) tall displayed a virtual aquarium to visitors. The grand opening was followed by the opening of the two Grand Hyatt hotel towers in October 2009, with 424 rooms in the Grand Tower and 367 in the "premium" Grand Club Tower. The hotel's ballroom could fit up to 2,500 guests, while primary restaurants included mezza9 Macau and Beijing Kitchen.

=== 2010–2018: Changing features and expansion ===
Created by Franco Dragone, The House of Dancing Water show incorporates various design elements such as fire, water effects, and atmospheric effects, and opened in the Dancing Water Theatre at the resort on September 17, 2010. Two years later, "the show was the recipient of a Thea Award for Outstanding Achievement for a Live Show Spectacular. The largest branded poker room in Macau, hosted by PokerStars, opened at City of Dreams in February 2013. A resident cabaret show by Dragone, Taboo, also debuted at the resort's Club Cubic venue in 2013, before closing in 2016. According to Barron's, in 2015 City of Dreams contributed 80% of Melco Resorts' revenue.

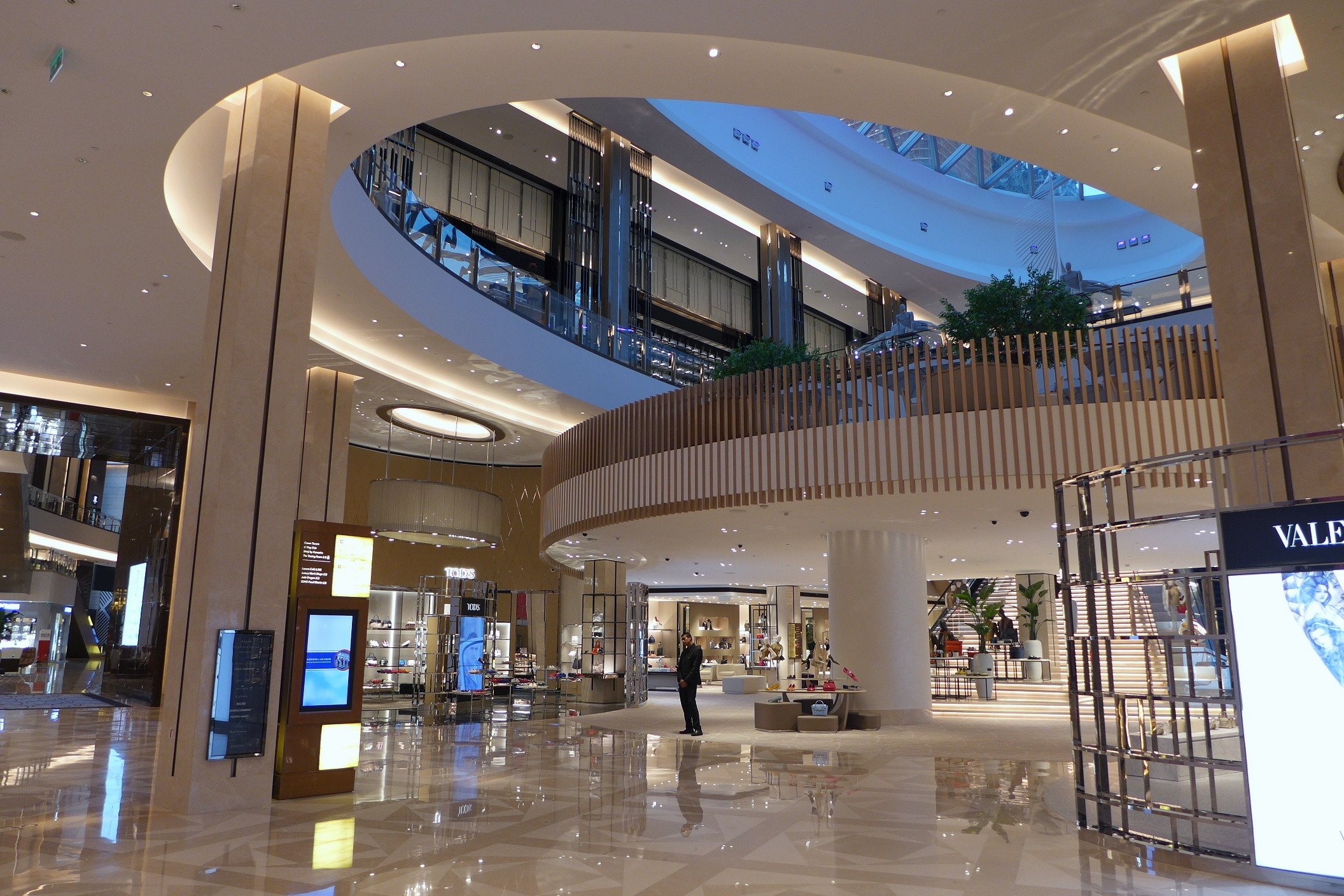
DFS T Galleria in City of Dreams, 2016

After a two year construction process, The Boulevard, which includes 175,000 square feet (16,300 m^{2}) of retail space surrounding the resort on two levels, was expanded in 2016. The project, developed with DFS, expanded on the original 70 shops and added outlets along Estrada do Istmo, Cotai's main street. In 2017 the Hard Rock Hotel was rebranded The Countdown Hotel, although the Hard Rock Café Macau retained its original branding. In May 2018, Crown Resorts ceased to be a co-owner of City of Dreams, and Crown Towers was rebranded to Nüwa. The resort's fifth tower, Morpheus, opened in 2018 with design by Zaha Hadid Architects and cuisine by Alain Ducasse.

=== 2019–2022: Revamp and hotel rebrandings ===
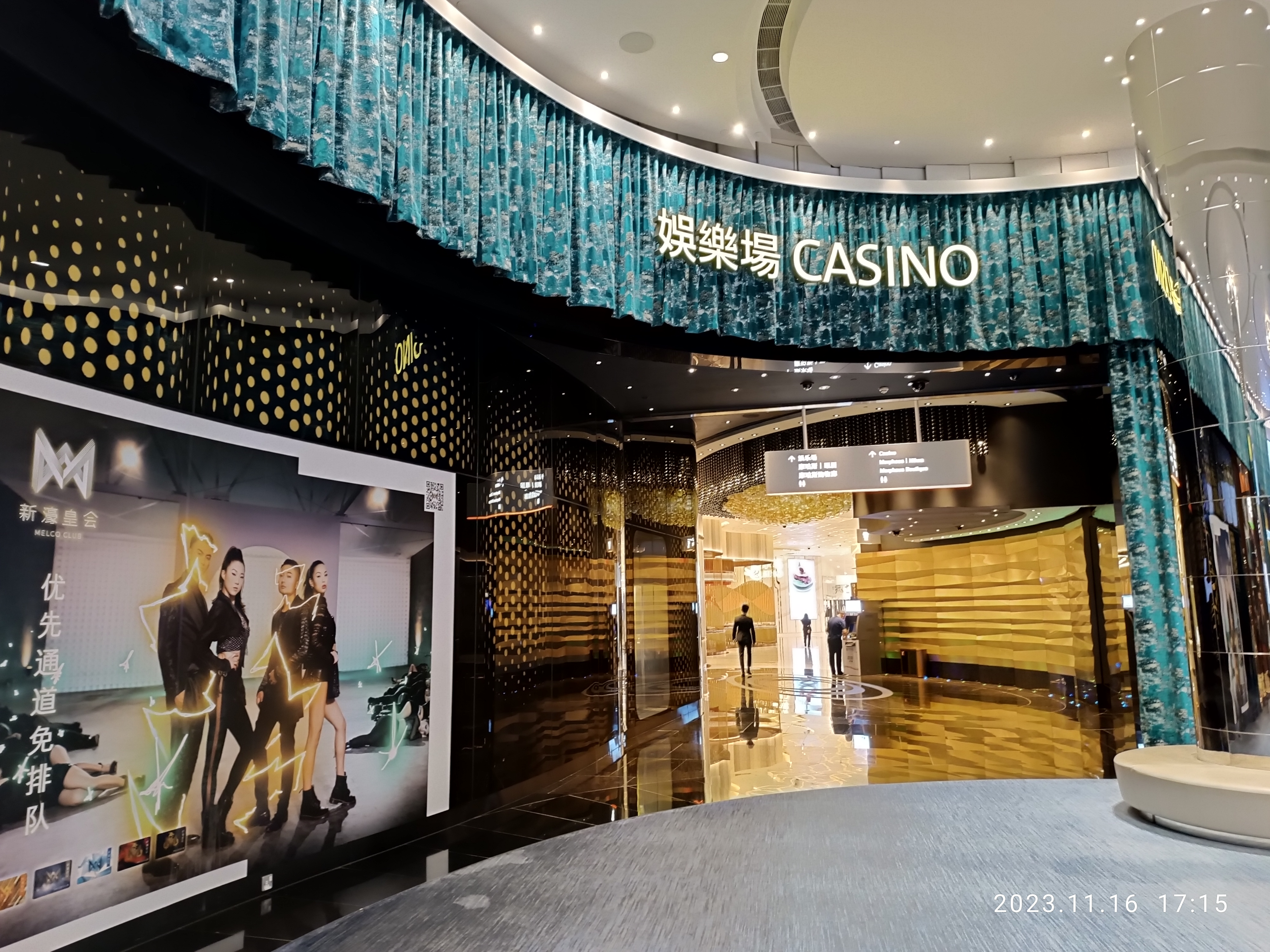
Entrance to the Casino

Melco Resorts & Entertainment Limited announced in 2019 that City of Dreams' hotels would undergo a revamp. The project includes a renovation of the Nüwa, three new luxury villas at the Morpheus, and a rebranding of The Countdown Hotel. By April 2019, The House of Dancing Water was the oldest running show on the Cotai Strip and had been seen by around 5 million spectators. In 2019, The House of Dancing Water production was purchased entirely by Melco Resorts from Dragone Macau Limitada, with Dragone retained as artistic director. After closing for a year for renovations, the Nüwa hotel reopened on March 31, 2021 with 300 hotel units, 33 of which were luxury villas. In August 2021, Inside Asian Gaming reported that the resort had seen its quarterly operating revenue increase from US$120.8 million in 2020 to $363.8 million in 2021. This comprised over half of Melco Resort's $530.8 million revenue for the quarter overall. In early October 2021, a government mandate temporarily closed all of Macau's entertainment venues, including City of Dreams's Club Cubic venue, in response to the COVID-19 pandemic. Melco Resorts announced on October 8, 2021 Club Cubic would be rebranded and that it would take over operations and management from the current operators. The club's new name was afterwards announced as Para Club.

== Design and features ==
Described as a "mega-casino" by The Guardian, in March 2020, City of Dreams was the third-largest casino in the world. Also known as CoD or CoD Macau, in total the integrated resort has three separate casinos, four hotels, five hotel towers, about 2,270 total rooms, over 30 restaurants and bars, 175,000 square feet (16,300 m^{2}) of retail space, 420,000 square feet (39,000 m^{2}) of gaming space, 496 gaming tables, and 487 gaming machines.

=== Hotels ===
Hotels	Yr. opened	Room No.
Nüwa	2009	300+
Grand Hyatt Macau	2009	791
REM	2026	149
Morpheus	2018	780

=== Entertainment ===
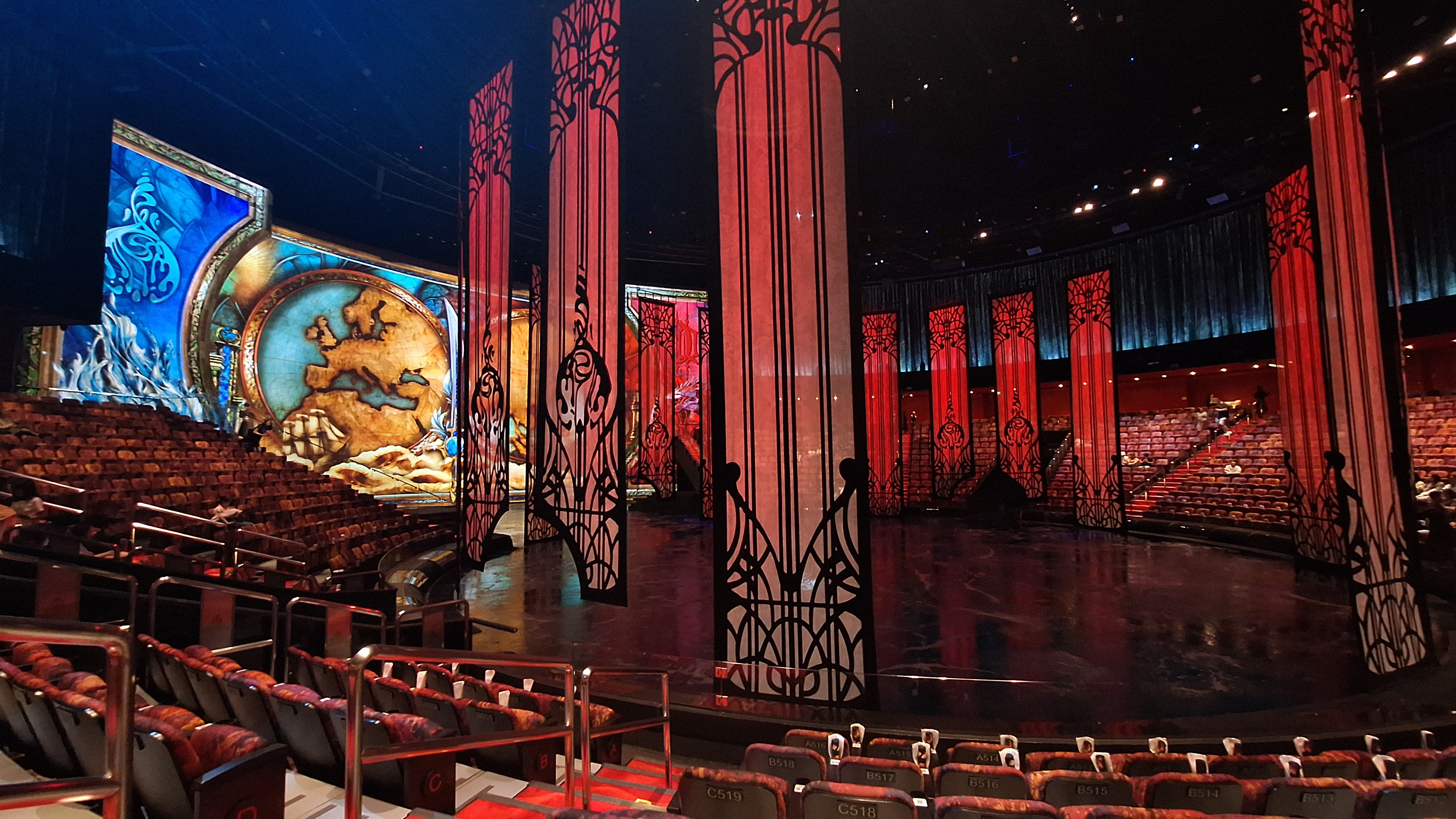
Dancing Water Theatre, a purpose-built theater for The House of Dancing Water, 2026

- Dancing Water Theatre - Located at the resort's Grand Hyatt Macau hotel, the theater contains one of the world's largest commercial pools with approximately 3,700,000 US gallons (14,000 m^{3}). There is sloped seating for as many as 2,000 theatre patrons to view acrobatics and water displays.
- Kids' City - Kids' City was Macau's largest children's attraction when it opened in 2010. The attraction provides child supervision, party planners, and music events and performances. Closed in early 2020 during the coronavirus pandemic, by 2022 the attraction had reopened for ages 2 to 12.
- Para Club - The locale operates Para Club, a large nightclub with a stage, a dance pool, VIP rooms, and bars. It was previously named Club Cubic.

== Gallery ==
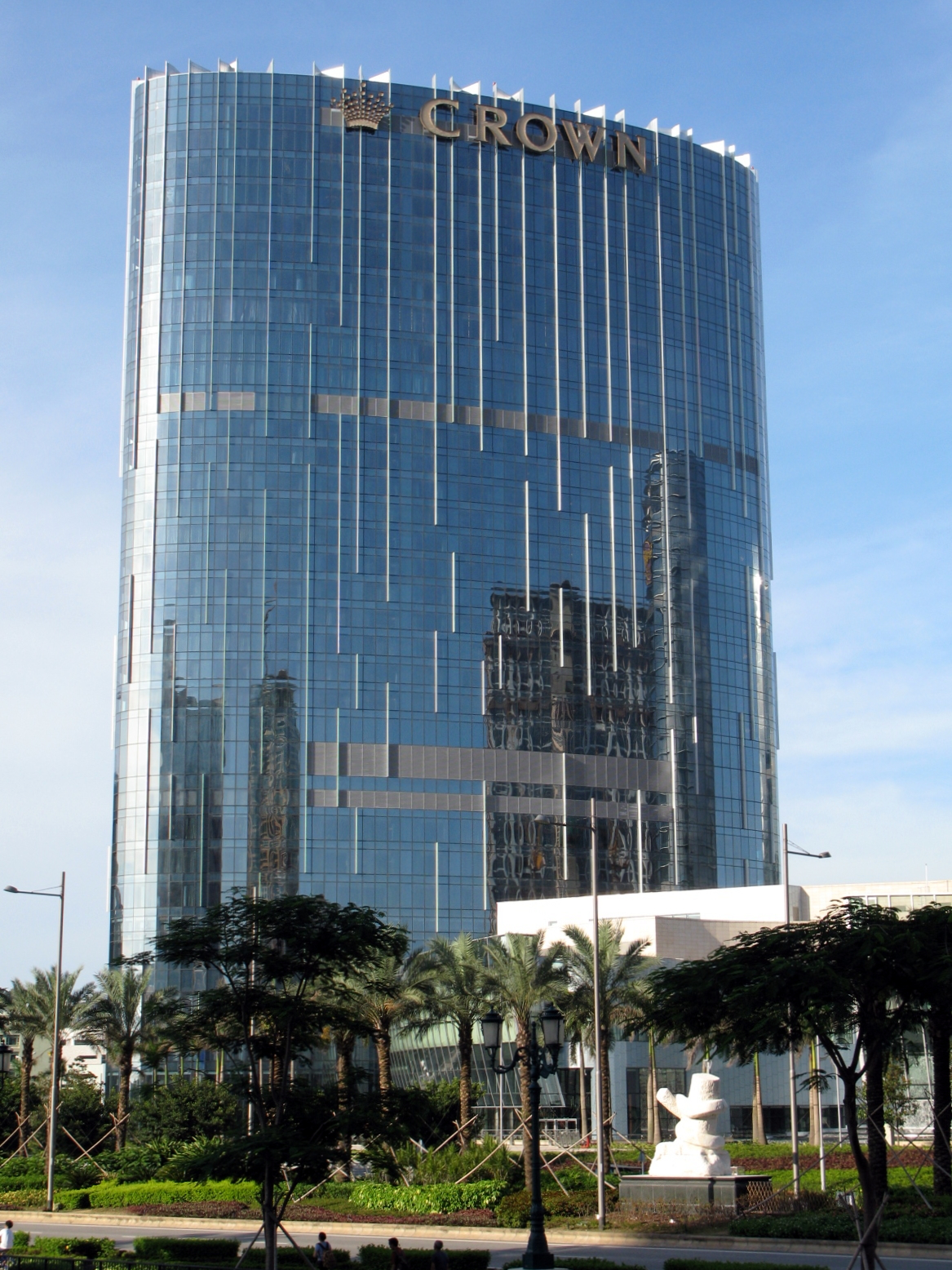
Crown Towers

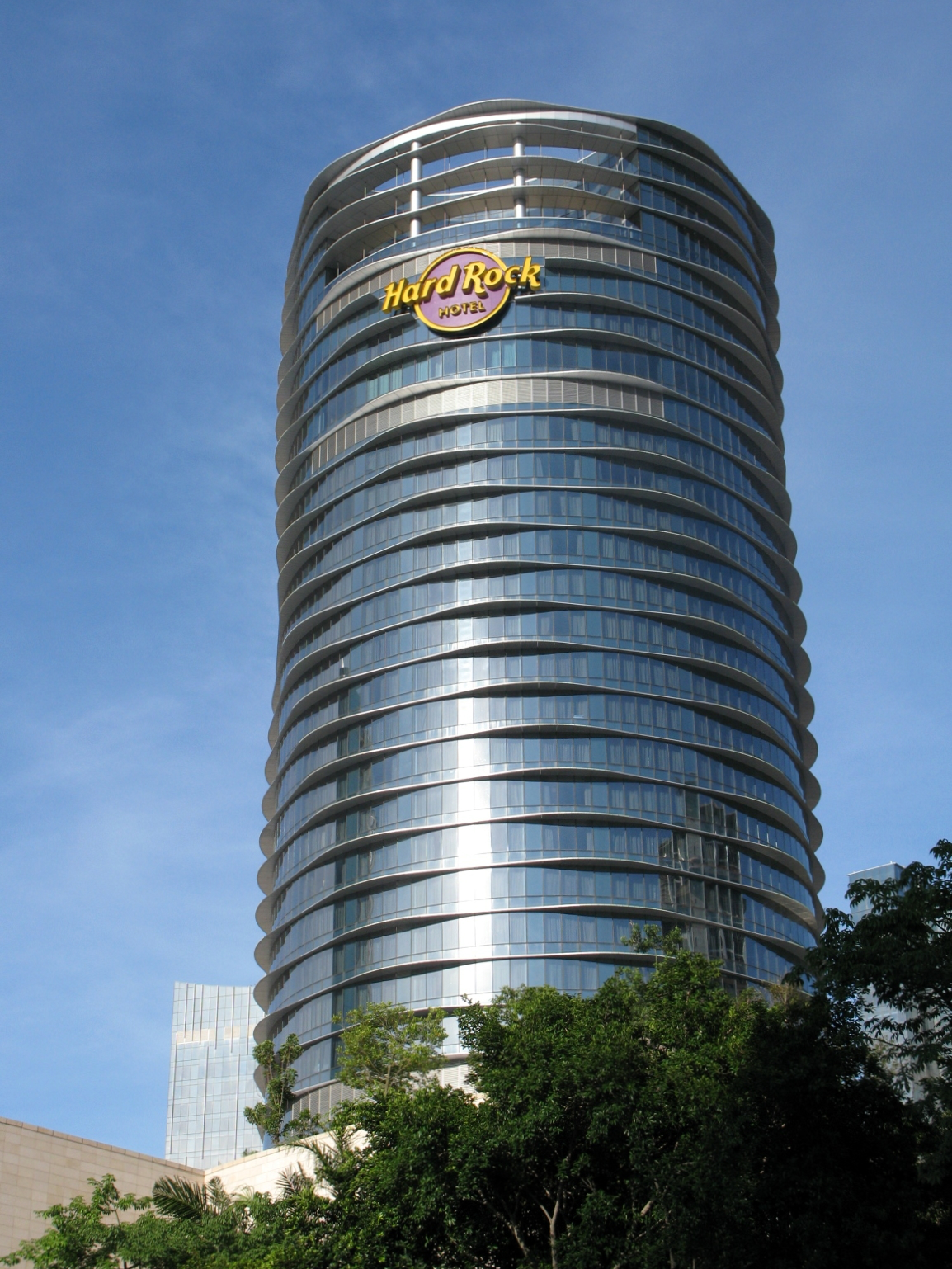
Hard Rock Hotel Macau was renamed "The Countdown" in July 2017

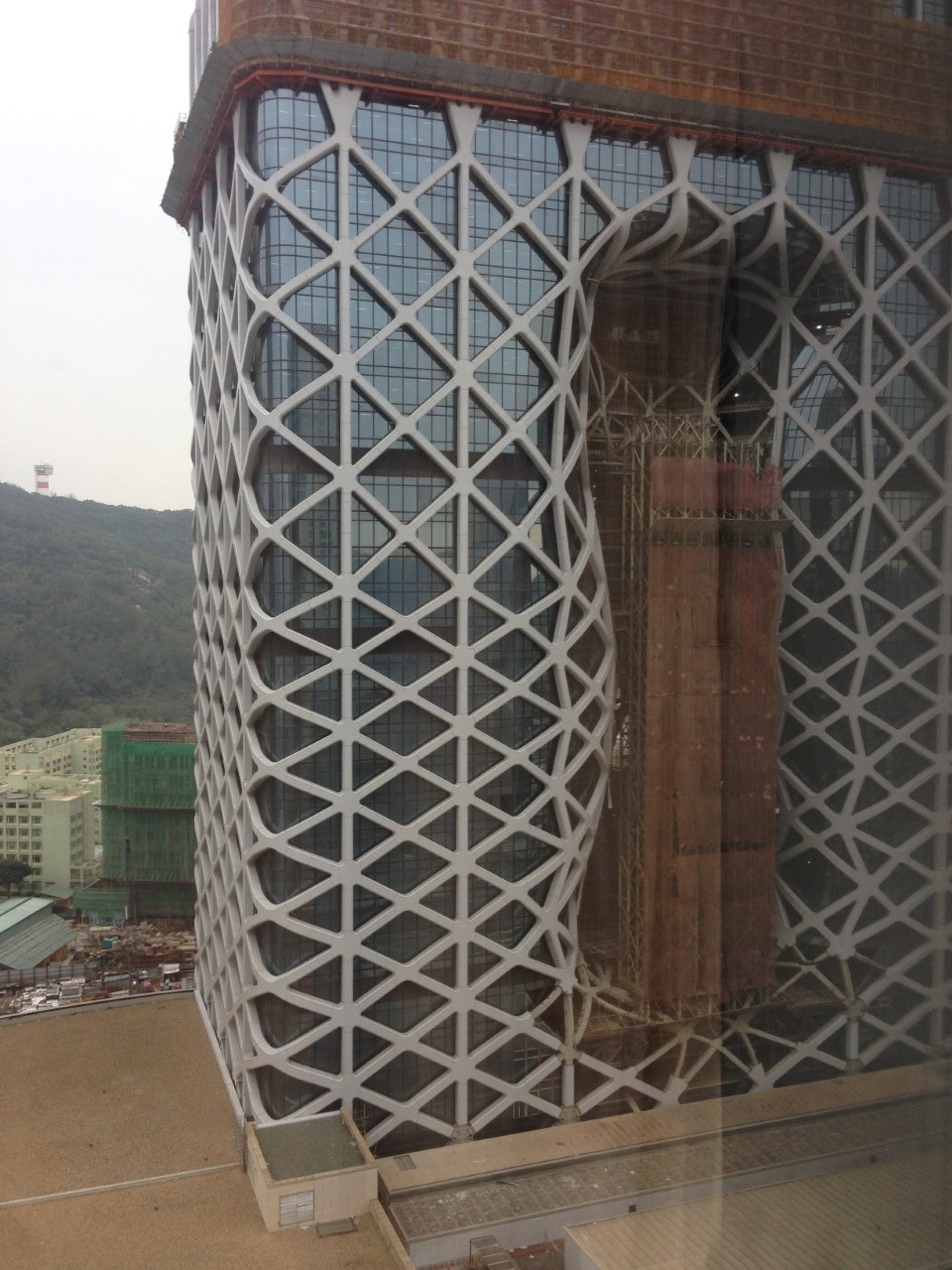
Morpheus Hotel under construction

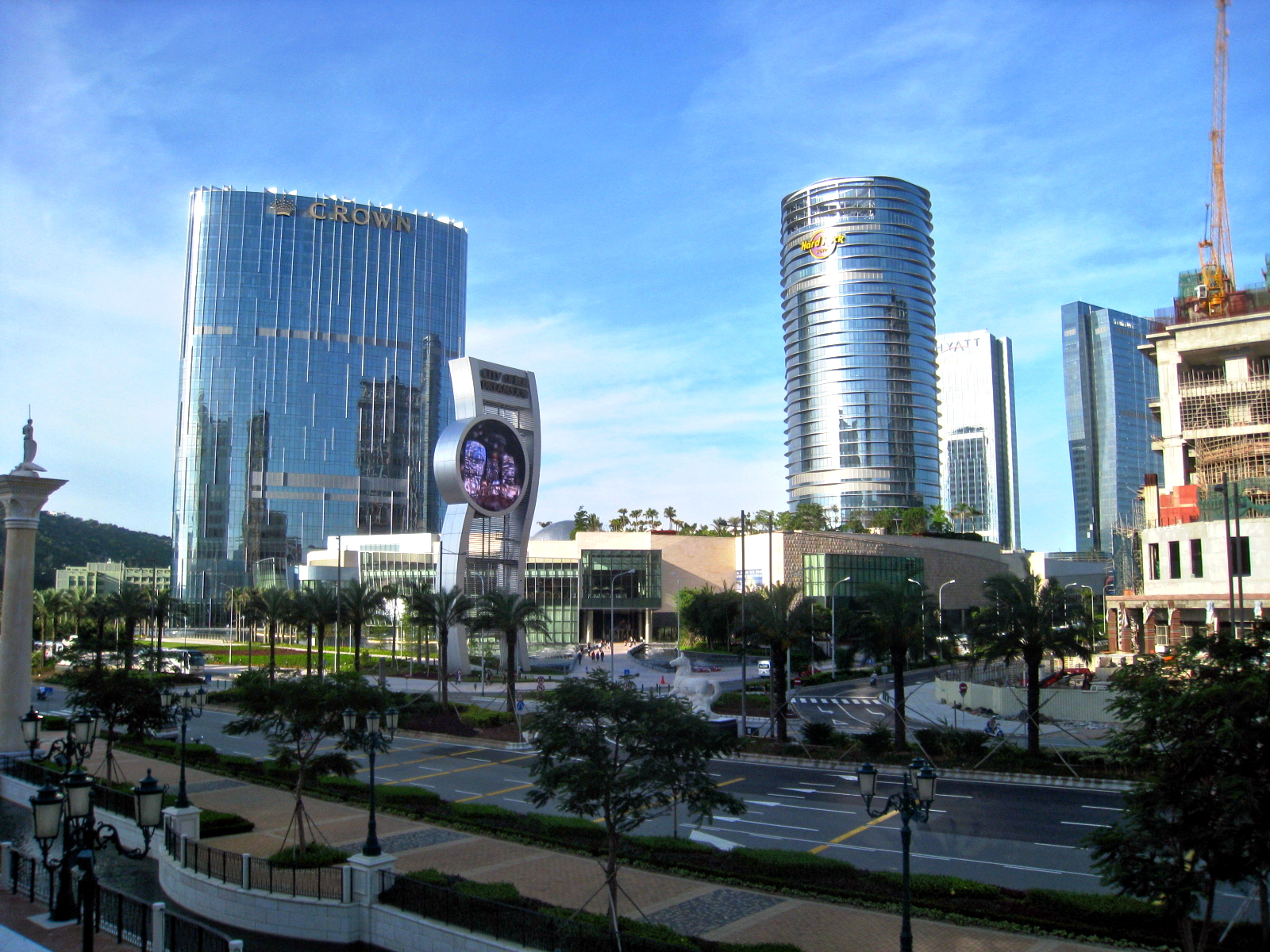
The resort in 2009

== See also ==
- Altira Macau
- Macao Studio City
- Gambling in Macau
- List of Macau casinos
- List of integrated resorts
