= Mandarin Oriental, Macau =

Hotel in Macau, China

Coordinates: 22°11′3″N 113°32′49″E

- 澳門文華東方酒店
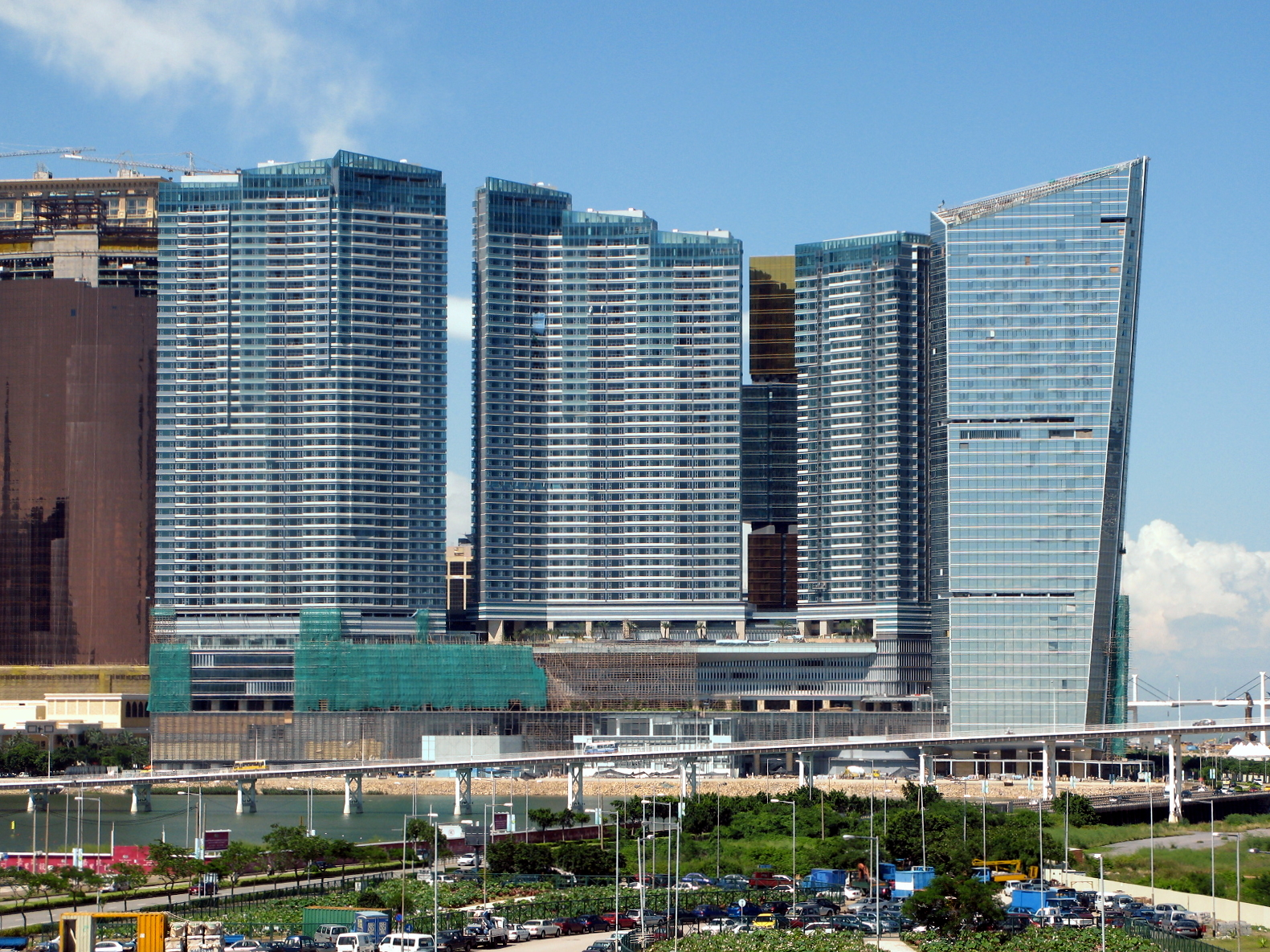

General information
- Inaugurated: 29 June 2010

Other information
- Number of rooms: 213

Website
- https://www.mandarinoriental.com/macau/one-central/luxury-hotel

Mandarin Oriental, Macau
- Traditional Chinese: 澳門文華東方酒店
- Simplified Chinese: 澳门文华东方酒店
Transcriptions
Standard Mandarin
- Hanyu Pinyin: Àomén Wénhuá Dōngfāng Jiǔdiàn
Yue: Cantonese
- Jyutping: ou3 mun4*2 man4 waa4 dung1 fong1 zau2 dim3

The Mandarin Oriental, Macau (Chinese: 澳門文華東方酒店) is a luxury hotel on Avenida Dr. Sun Yat-sen in Sé, Macau, Special administrative regions of China. The hotel overlooks the Outer Harbour and Nam Van Lake, and is part of the One Central development connected to the MGM Macau and immediately to the south of the Wynn Macau. The Mandarin Oriental has 213 rooms and is managed by Mandarin Oriental Hotel Group.

The hotel opened on 29 June 2010. Despite being in Macau, the property does not have a casino so as to differentiate itself and provide a non-gaming alternative to guests and is the only non-gaming five-star hotel in Macau. The hotel is described by Lonely Planet as a "refreshing alternative" to the many casino hotels of the city.

The property also features 92 residences and serviced apartments, located on the fifteen floors above the hotel.
