= Nova Taipa Gardens =

Housing estate in Macau, China

- 濠景花園; Urbanização Jardim Nova Taipa
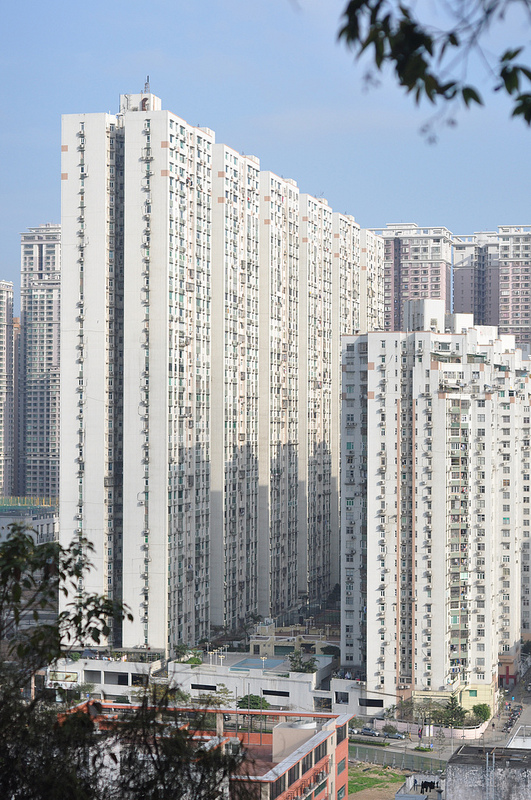
- A view of Nova Taipa Gardens from adjacent hills

- Location within Macau

General information
- Location: Taipa, Macau, Taipa, Macau
- Coordinates: 22.15932°N 113.55295°E

Nova Taipa Gardens (Chinese: 濠景花園; Portuguese: Urbanização Jardim Nova Taipa) is a large residential development in northern Taipa, Macau, occupying a 176,000-square-metre site in Baixa da Taipa. The estate was built in phases from the late 1990s as a joint-venture project, and on completion was planned to hold more than 4,000 apartments together with commercial, office, hotel and amenity space. By 2012, the completed portion comprised 13 buildings with 2,271 registered independent units, and that year the owners elected a management committee to oversee the common areas. Local reporting has since focused on proposed uses for the adjoining land and on efforts by community groups to address windows falling from the estate and the neighbouring Nam San Garden.

== Development and management ==
Nova Taipa Gardens is located in Baixa da Taipa, Macau's major residential district and the site of many of the city's large housing developments. Nova Taipa Gardens was developed as a joint venture combining residential, commercial, social-amenity, office and hotel uses on a 176,000 m^{2} site on Taipa Island. The 2004 annual report said that the project was planned in five phases and, on completion, was expected to contain more than 4,000 residential units and 4,000 parking spaces. Hopewell also reported that phase 1 had been completed in 1997 and that phase 2 was planned in three sub-phases, the first of which, phase 2C, comprised five residential blocks with about 680 apartments and 800 parking spaces; construction of phase 2C began in August 2004. In its 2005 annual report, Hopewell referred to this part of the scheme as Nova City, gave a slightly revised figure of 684 apartments, and said that pre-sales were expected in the second half of that year. The same report said that the joint venture company had disposed of its development right in phase 4 to one of its shareholders. In November 2012, Nova Taipa Gardens held its first owners' assembly. By that date the estate comprised 13 buildings grouped into eight sub-parts, with 2,271 registered independent units used for residential, commercial, social-amenity, nursery and parking purposes, including 2,123 parking spaces. The meeting elected a 50-member management committee and approved a common reserve fund for the upkeep of common areas.

== Nearby land-use planning ==
In early 2023, the government was preparing detailed planning for Taipa Central District 2, including a proposal to turn the unused land behind Nova Taipa Gardens into public green space; an earlier tyre-park idea had been treated only as a temporary land-use concept.

Later that year, plots BT8 and BT9a, located between Nam San Garden and Nova Taipa Gardens, were put up for auction for private residential development; BT8 attracted no bids and BT9a received one.

In 2025, the government said that BT11 and BT12, adjoining those sites, would be developed as a public park above an underground public car park, after earlier plans for a temporary tyre park and, later, an ice-skating rink were dropped.

== Maintenance and safety issues ==
In 2020, Macau Post Daily reported that the Islands District Community Service Consultative Council had formed a "falling window concern group" and had called for a combination of owner precautions, official testing, and, eventually, legislation requiring regular window inspections by qualified technicians. The report added that representatives of the Synergy of Macau Association said Nova Taipa Gardens had recorded 168 falling-window incidents over the previous two years. It also said that a free inspection programme for Nova Taipa Gardens and Nam San Garden had drawn only 85 participating flats, fewer than 3 percent of households, and that the association estimated that 70 to 80 percent of windows in the two estates were at risk of falling.

A December 2020 report by the Islands District Community Service Consultative Council said that more than 200 windows had fallen from Nova Taipa Gardens and neighbouring Nam San Garden between 2015 and 2019, and linked the problem chiefly to corroded or worn hinges, inadequate maintenance and exposure to weather. In late 2021 and early 2022, neighbourhood groups launched a pilot scheme to install anti-fall chains in 100 flats in the two estates. In a 2024 report, the Macau General Union of Neighbourhood Associations said that the anti-fall-chain installation scheme had noticeably improved the falling-window problem in the participating estates.

== See also ==
- List of tallest buildings in Macau
