= Hotung family =

Eurasian family in Hong Kong

Hotung family 何東家族
- Hong Kong Eurasian family
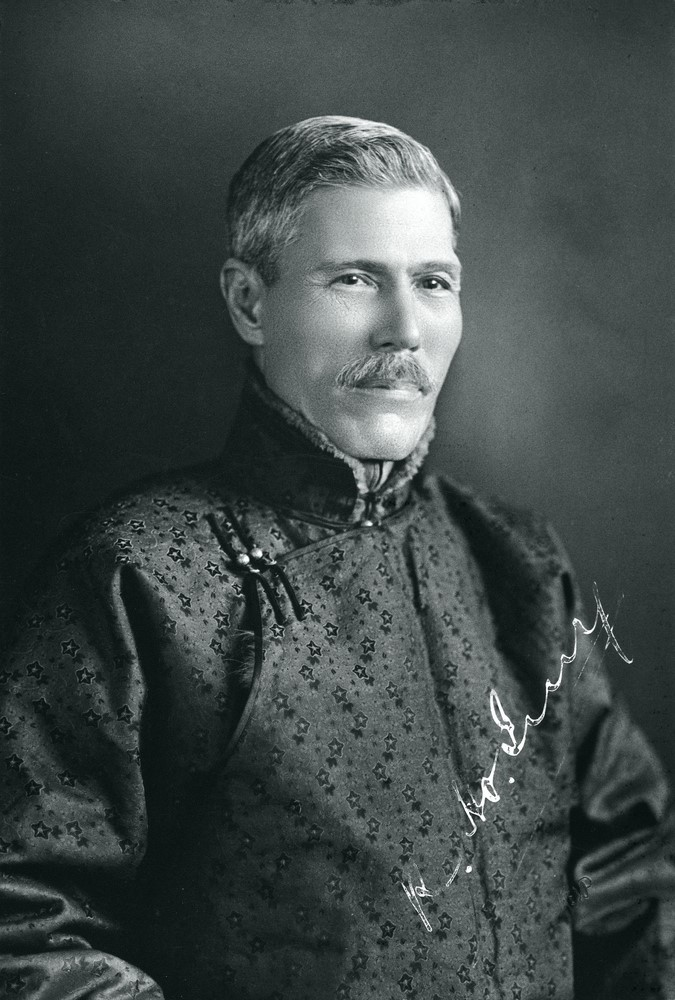
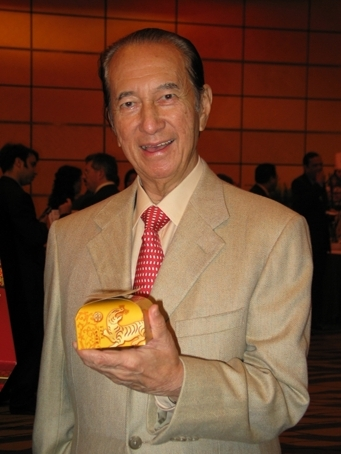
- Robert Hotung, c. 1910s Stanley Ho, 2006
- Current region: Hong Kong; Macau
- Founded: 1890s
- Founder: Robert Hotung

Hotung family (Chinese: 何東家族) or Ho family is a prominent Eurasian family in Hong Kong. Originated in the 1890s during British rule in Hong Kong, the family was considered one of the four big families of Hong Kong during the colonial period. While the Hotungs are no longer seen as part of the contemporary big four (popularly called the four major real estate families), they remain the most renowned and the most compelling family.

Stanley Ho, the grandnephew of Robert Hotung, founder of the family, expanded his influence through gambling industry in Macau and established his house as one of the four great families of Macau.

== History ==
Arms of Hotung Secondary School, and possibly similar to that of Sir Robert Hotung

Charles Henry (Note: The middle name "Henry" was engraved on the headstone at his grave, but some sources wrote it as "Henri".) Maurice Bosman (29 August 1839 – 10 November 1892) was born in Rotterdam, Netherlands as Mozes Hartog Bosman into a Dutch Jewish family. Bosman arrived at Hong Kong in around 1859 and worked in the city for some 15 years. He was described as a businessman of very considerable attainments, and also served as Consul for the Netherlands at Hong Kong. During his stay in Hong Kong he met Madam Sze (1841 – 20 April 1896), a Chinese lady also known as Sze Tai (施娣). Their first child was Ho Kai-tung (何啟東), later known as Robert Hotung, born in 1862. While of mixed Eurasian parentage, Hotung identified himself as native Chinese. One theory claims that his surname "Ho" derives from Holland, where Bosman was born.

Bosman left Hong Kong in 1873 for London to establish his Eastern Agency. Hotung was raised solely by his mother, and eventually became the richest man in Hong Kong. He was nicknamed "Far East JP Morgan" and "Grand Old Man of Hong Kong".

== Family tree ==
=== Bosman family ===
- Levie Jacob Bosman (born c. 1700)
  - Jacob Levy Bosman (1746–1829)
    - Mozes Jacob Bosman (1793–1862) ∞ Antje Hertog van Straaten
      - Hartog Mozes Bosman (1820–49) ∞ Anna de Vries (1822–91)
        - Mozes Hartog Bosman / Charles Henry Maurice Bosman (何仕文, 1839–92) ∞ Sze Tai (施娣, 1841–96), Mary Agnes Forbes
          - (Note: ∞ Sze) Ho Kai-tung / Robert Hotung
            - Ho's second family
          - Ho Kai-fook
            - Ho's third family
          - Ho Kai-moon
          - Ho Kai-gai / Walter Bosman
          - (Note: ∞ Forbes) Alexander Bosman
            - Barbara Bosman ∞ Peter Hamilton Holmes
              - Simon Holmes ∞ Vivienne
                - 3 children (Christabel, Louisa, Jonathan)
              - Jonathan Holmes
                - 2 children
            - Jean Inglis Bosman ∞ Robert
              - 3 daughters
          - Irene Bosman ∞ Hay Matthey
            - H.I. Bill Matthey
            - Imogen Matthey ∞ Reay Geddes
              - 2 sons and 3 daughters
          - 3? other children
        - Jansje Bosman (born 1842)
        - Annetje Bosman (born 1845)
        - Gloria Sophia Bosman (born 1847)

=== Ho family ===
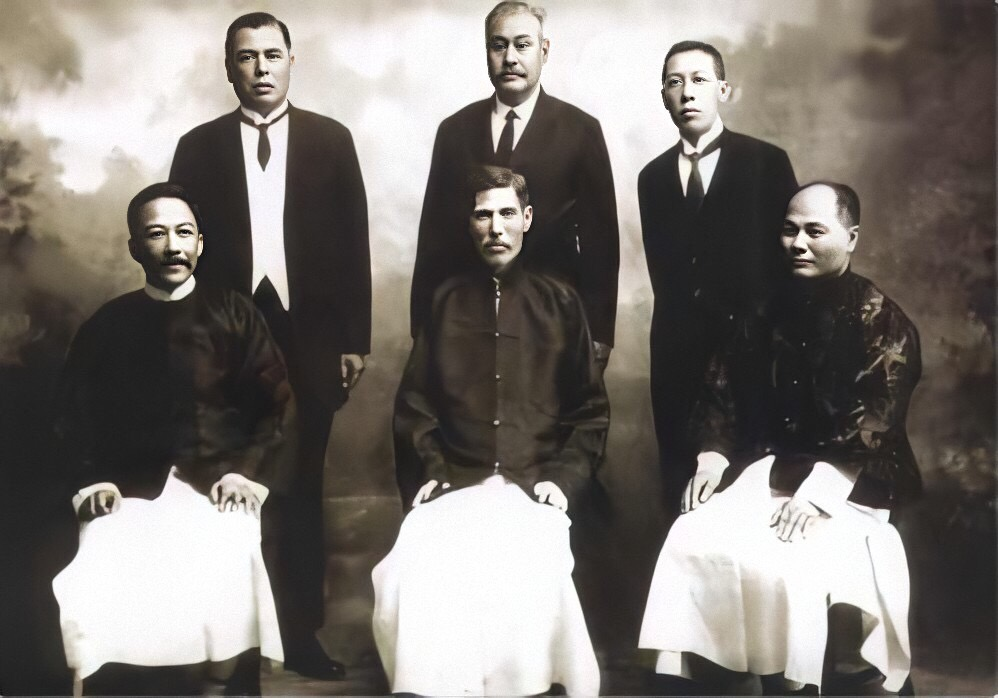
Ho Kai-tung (seated, middle), his brother Ho Kai-fook (left, standing) and his maternal half-brother Ho Kom-tong (seated, right)

==== Ho's first family ====
Ho's first family (何一宅) refers to descendants of Ho Pak-ngan, of an unknown European and Sze Tai.

- Unknown European ∞ Sze Tai
  - Ho Pak-ngan (何柏顏, 1861–97) ∞ Tsoi Sing-nam
    - 1 son and 1 daughter (Note: The 2 childnre are: Tsoi Po-sang (蔡浦生), Tsoi Kit-ching (蔡潔清))

==== Ho's second and third family ====
Ho's second, third, fourth, and sixth family are descendants of children of Bosman and Sze Tai.

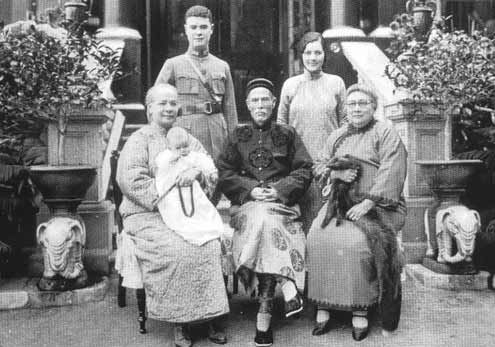
(seated from left to right) Clara Cheung, Sir Robert Hotung, Margaret Mak; (standing from left to right) Ho Shai-lai, Hesta Hung

Ho's second family (何二宅), also known as the Hotung family or "Ho Cheung Sing Tong" (何昌盛堂), refers to descendants of Robert Hotung. Ho's third family (何三宅), also known as Ho Cheung Yuen Tong (何昌遠堂) refers to descendants of Ho Kai-fook. Ho's fourth family and Ho's sixth family both have no issue as, respectively, Ho Kai-moon and Ho Kai-gai, later known as Walter Bosman, died childless.

- Charles Henry Maurice Bosman ∞ Sze Tai
  - Robert Hotung / Ho Kai-tung (何啟東, 1862–1956) ∞ Margaret Mak Sau-ying (麥秀英, 1865–1944), Clara Cheung Ching-yung (張靜蓉, 1875–1938), Chau Yee-man (周綺文)
    - (Note: ∞ Mak, adopted from Ho Kai-fook) Ho Sai-wing (何世榮, 1884–1946) ∞ Kitty Anderson (洪蘊芝, 1885–1964)
      - 10 children (Note: The 10 children are: Alexandra Ho Wai-kwan (何煒君), Diana Ho Miu-kwan (何妙君), Ernest Ho Hung-kwan (何鴻鈞), Florence Ho Kwai-kwan (何季君), Gertrude Ho Che-kwan (何智君), Horace Ho Hung-pong (何鴻邦), Ivan Ho Hung-chung (何鴻宗), Julia Ho Wing-kwan (何穎君), Kenneth Ho Hung-mun (何鴻敏), Louise Ho Chi-kwan (何懿君))
    - (Note: ∞ Cheung) Victoria Jubilee Hotung (何錦姿, 1897–1992) ∞ Lo Man-kam (羅文錦, 1893–1959)
      - Lo Tak-shing (羅德丞, 1935–2006)
        - 2 sons and 2 daughters
      - 5 other children
    - Henry Hotung / Ho Sai-kan (何世勤, 1898–1900) {no issue}
    - Daisy Hotung (何慧姿, 1899–1975) ∞ Au-Yeung Pak-cheong (歐陽伯祥) {no issue}
    - (Note: ∞ Chau) Mary Patrica Hotung Shun-chee (何純姿, 1900–71) ∞ Wong Sik-lam (黃錫霖, 1893–1971)
      - David Wong Yat-suen (黃日煊, adopted)
    - Edward Hotung / Ho Sai-kim (何世儉, 1902–1957) ∞ Alice Maud Newman
      - Eric Hotung / Ho Hung-cheung (何鴻章, 1926–2017) ∞ Patricia Anne Shea (佘安妮)
        - Michael Hotung (何猷浩)
          - 2 daghters
        - Robert Hotung (何猷源)
          - 2 sons
        - Eric Hotung (何猷威)
          - 3 daughters
        - Sean Hotung (何猷彪)
        - Anthony Hotung (何猷豹)
          - 1 son
        - 3 other daughters (Note: The three daughters are: Mara, Gabrielle, Sheridan)
        - Michael Eric Hotung / Mak Shun-ming (see Winnie Ho Yuen-ki)
        - Barbara Mak (see Winnie Ho Yuen-ki)
      - Patrick Hotung / Ho Hung-hin (何鴻憲)
      - Joseph Hotung / Ho Hung-hing (何鴻卿, 1930–2021)
      - Antonia Hotung / Ho Hang-kwan (何杏君)
      - Mary Hotung / Ho To-kwan (何桃君)
    - Eva Hotung Han-chee (1903/1993, 何嫻姿) {no issue}
    - Irene Hotung Ki-chee (何奇姿, 1904–2007) ∞ Cheng Hsiang-hsien (鄭湘先)
      - June Cheng Ka-yuk (鄭家玉)
    - Robert Hotung / Ho Shai-lai (何世禮, 1906–98) ∞ Hesta Hung (洪奇芬)
      - Robert Ho Hung-ngai (何鴻毅, 1932–2025)
      - Margaret Ho Min-kwan (何勉君)
    - Jean Hotung (何文姿, 1908–95) ∞ William M. Gittins, Serge Hohlov
      - 2 children (Note: The 2 children are: John Gittins, Elizabeth Gittins)
    - Grace Hotung (何堯姿, 1910–2001) ∞ Horace Lo (羅文灝), John Gittins
      - Shirley Lo Pui-yee (羅佩儀)
    - Florence Hotung (何孝姿, 1915–2011) ∞ Yeo Kok-cheang (楊國璋, 1903–2004)
      - 3 children (Note: The 3 children are: Richard Yeo Yau-shing (楊允誠), Daphne Yeo Chi-lim (楊紫簾), Wendy Yeo Chi-ha (楊紫霞))
    - (Note: ∞ Katie Archee, an illegitimate child) George Ho Cho-chi (何佐芝, 1918–2014) ∞ Jessie Fung (馮月燕)
      - Linda Kwan (何騉)
      - George Joseph Ho Kay (何驥)
  - Ho Kai-fook (何啟福, 1863–1926) ∞ Lucy Rothwell (羅絮才)
    - Ho Sai-wing
    - Bessie Ho Bo-chi (何寶姿) ∞ Cheung Pui-kai (張沛階)
      - 4 children (Note: The 4 children are: Margaret Cheung Yun-min (張燄綿), Lily Cheung Yun-yau (張燄柔), Howard Cheung Shui-hong (張瑞康), James Joseph Cheung Shui-ling (張瑞寧))
    - Ho Sai-iu (何世耀) ∞ Ethel Zimmern (施燕芳)
      - Stella Ho Yuen-duen (何婉端)
      - Helen Ho Yuen-yee (何婉宜)
      - John Ho Hung-chiu (何鴻超, 1916–2005)
      - Vivienne Ho Yuen-fun (何婉芬)
      - Audrey Ho Yuen-ming (何婉明)
      - Kenneth Ho Hung-kin (何鴻堅)
      - Daphne Ho Yuen-bun (何婉彬)
      - David Ho Hung-sui (何鴻瑞, by concubine)
      - Ho Hung-fai (何鴻輝, by concubine)
    - Ho Sai-kwong (何世光, 1886–1974) ∞ Flora Hall (冼慶雲)
      - Bertram Ho Hung-yan (何鴻恩)
      - Mary Ho Yuen-wo (何婉和)
      - Ernest Reginald Stewart Ho (何鴻展)
      - John Stephen Ho (何鴻威)
      - Priscilla Ho Yuen-cheung (何婉璋)
      - Patricia Ho Yuen-man (何婉文)
      - Joseph Ho Hung-tao (何鴻韜)
      - Nanette Ho Yuen-hung (何婉鴻, 1920–2023)
      - Stanley Ho Hung-sun (何鴻燊, 1921–2020) ∞ Clementina Ângela Leitão (黎婉華, 1923–2024), Lucina Azul Laam King-ying (藍瓊纓, 1937/8–2022), Ina Chan Un-chan (陳婉珍, 1954–), Leong On-kei (梁安琪, 1961–)
        - (Note: ∞ Leitão) Jane Francis Ho (何超英)
        - Robert Ho Yau-kwong (何猷光, 1948–81) ∞ Suki Potier (1947–81)
        - Angela Ho (何超賢)
        - Deborah Ho (何超雄)
        - (Note: ∞ Laam) Pansy Catalina Ho Chiu-king (何超瓊, 1962–) ∞ Julian Hui (許晉亨, 1962–)
        - Daisy Ho Chiu-fung (何超鳳, 1964–)
        - Maisy Ho (何超蕸)
        - Josie Ho (何超儀, 1974–) ∞ Conroy Chan (陳子聰)
        - Lawrence Ho Yau-lung (何猷龍, 1977–)
        - (Note: ∞ Chan) Florinda Ho (何超雲)
        - Laurinda Ho (何超蓮)
        - Orlando Ho (何猷啟)
        - (Note: ∞ Leong) Sabrina Ho Chiu-yeng (何超盈, 1990–)
        - Ho Yau-bong (何猷邦)
        - Arnaldo Ho (何猷亨)
        - Mario Ho (何猷君) ∞ Ming Xi (奚夢瑤, 1989–)
        - Alice Ho (何超欣)
      - Winnie Ho Yuen-ki (何婉琪)
        - 2 other children
        - (Note: ∞ Eric Hotung) Michael Eric Hotung / Mak Shun-ming (何東舜銘/麥舜銘)
          - Michel Mak (麥景榕)
        - Barbara Mak (麥慧玉)
      - Susie Ho (何婉婉) ∞ Teddy Yip (葉德利, 1907–2003)
      - Ho Hung-tuen (何鴻端)
      - Louise Ho Yuen-wing (何婉穎)
    - Ho Sai-leung (何世亮) {no issue}
    - Ho Sai-chuen (何世全, 1891–1938)
      - Iris Ho (何婉[?])
      - Pansy Ho Yuen-lan (何婉蘭)
    - Ho Sai-cheuk (何世焯) ∞ Florence Hall (冼慶祥)
      - Helen Ho Yuen-hang (何婉衍)
      - Kathleen Ho Yuen-kwan (何婉坤)
      - Yvonne Ho Yuen-yuen (何婉元)
      - Elaine Ho Yuen-kei (何婉基)
      - Ho Hung-chi (何鴻志)
      - Mamie Ho Yuen-min (何婉綿)
    - Elizabeth Ho Bo-yung (何寶容) ∞ Arthur Waller
      - 6 children (Note: The 6 children are: Raymond Arthur Waller, Beatrice Elizabeth Waller, Edmund Arthur Waller, Lewis Arthur Waller, Francis Henry Waller, Edgar Joseph Waller)
    - Ho Sai-ki (何世奇) ∞ Doris Lo How-jing (羅巧貞)
      - Algernon Ho Hung-ching (何鴻政)
      - Ronald Ho Hung-ka (何鴻嘉) ∞ Laura Fan Elizabeth Choa (蔡慧廉) {no issue}
      - Pamela Ho Yuen-yeung (何婉揚) ∞ Douglas Hunt (洪淳釗)
        - 2 daughters (Note: The 2 daughters are: Sandra Hunt, Sheila Hunt)
      - Cecilia Ho Yuen-lun (何婉倫) ∞ John Greaves
        - Stanley Greaves
      - Eric Peter Ho (何鴻鑾, 1927–2015) ∞ Grace Irene Young Tsin-kiu (何楊展翹, 1929–2007)
        - Doris Anne Ho (何頌德) ∞ Gordon Jamieson
          - 3 children (Note: The 3 children are: Ruth Jamieson, Duncan Jamieson, Samuel Jamieson)
        - 2 other children (Note: The 3 children are: Albert Victor Ho (何猶幹), Doris Anne Ho, David Ronald Ho (何猶慶) ∞ Christine Ramsden)
    - Victoria Ho Bo-lin (何寶蓮) ∞ James Bush {no issue}
    - Nancy Ho Bo-ji (何寶芝) ∞ A. E. Kew
      - 2 children (Note: The 2 children are: Geoffrey Kew, Gordon Kew)
    - Phyllis Ho Bo-yin (何寶賢) ∞ Edward Law {no issue}
  - Ho Kai-moon (何啟滿, 1865–1892, adopted by Pau family) {no issue}
  - Walter Bosman / Ho Kai-gai (何啟佳, 1867–1945/6) {no issue}

==== Ho's fifth family ====
Ho's fifth family (何五宅), also known as the Hotung family or "Ho Cheung Sin Tong" (何昌善堂), refers to descendants of non-Eurasian Ho Kom-tong, of Sze Tai and an unknown Chinese.

- Unknown Chinese ∞ Sze Tai
  - Ho Kom-tong (何甘棠, 1866–1950)
    - Ho Sai-kit (何世傑) ∞ Winnie Choa, Tung Yim-king (董琰琼)
      - 10 children (Note: The 10 children are: Ho Hung-to (何鴻圖), Pansy Ho Ching-chui (何晴翠), Ho Hung-shu (何鴻書), Ho Hung-kei (何鴻基), Lilian Ho Ching-ha (何晴霞), John Ho Hung-yip (何鴻業), Ho Hung-wai (何鴻惠), Richard Ho Hung-tik (何鴻迪), Wendy Ho Ching-siew (何晴笑), Ho Hung-hang (何鴻亨))
    - Ho Sai-wah (何世華) ∞ May Zimmern (施瑞芳)
      - 2 children (Note: The 2 children are: Connie Ho Ching-hei (何晴熹), Gertrude Ho Ching-ho (何晴灝))
    - Ho Sai-man (何世文) ∞ Ivy Tang Oi-wah (鄧愛華)
      - 3 children (Note: The 3 children are: Rita Ho Ching-lai (何晴麗), Ho Hung-yiu (何鴻堯, adopted by concubine), Ho Bo-chu (何寶珠, adopted by concubine))
    - Ho Sai-cheong (何世昌) ∞ Lai Chung-yu (黎宗愉)
      - 2 children (Note: The 2 children are: Gerald Ho Hung-fat (何鴻發), Jane Ho Ching-fai (何晴暉))
    - Ho Sai-on (何世安) {no issue}
    - Ho Sai-lok (何世樂) ∞ Chiu Wai-jan (趙慧真)
      - 3 children (Note: The 3 children are: Peter Ho Hung-sum (何鴻森, adopted), Ho Hung-sing (何鴻星), Ho Ching-long (何晴朗, adopted))
    - Ho Sai-hong (何世康) {no issue}
    - Ho Sai-kin (何世健) {no issue}
    - Ho Sai-wai (何世威) ∞ Cheung Yi-lin (張意蓮) {no issue}
    - Ho Sai-yung (何世勇) ∞ Mak Bik-sim (麥碧嬋)
      - 1 son and 4 daughters (Note: The 5 children are: Simon Ho Yiu-ming (何耀明), Vivien Ho Wai-man (何慧敏), Miranda Ho Wai-ling (何慧玲), Helen Ho Wai-kei (何慧姬), Esther Ho Wai-lan (何慧蘭))
    - Ho Sai-hung (何世雄) ∞ Lo Sui-ying (羅瑞英)
      - 4 children (Note: The 4 children are: Sabrina Ho Che-wai (何智慧), Belinda Ho Che-wing (何智穎), David Ho Che-chung (何智聰), Christina Ho Che-ming (何智明))
    - Ho Sai-kong (何世剛) ∞ Chow Sik-yi (周式宜)
      - 2 children (Note: The 2 children are: Stanley Ho Wang-tat (何宏達), Stephen Ho Wang-yan (何宏恩))
    - Ho Sai-keung (何世強) {no issue}
    - Paul Ho Sai-mang (何世猛) ∞ May Wong Mei-fu (黃美芙) {no issue}
    - Ho Sai-lit (何世烈) {no issue}
    - Ho Sai-kut (何世吉) {no issue}
    - Elizabeth Ho Pak-ling (何柏齡) ∞ Tse Ka-po (謝家寶)
      - Kathleen Eunice Cheung (謝琮賢, 1912–2013) ∞ Philip Cheung Wing-min (張榮冕, 1906–85)
      - 5 other sons and daughters (Note: The 6 children are: Andrew Tse (謝德安), Lucy Tse (謝珮賢), Agnes Tse (謝俏賢), Mary Tse (謝慧賢), Ann Tse (謝瑞賢), Kathleen Tse (謝琮賢))
    - Elise Ho Pak-ching (何柏貞) ∞ Choa Po-yiu (蔡寶耀)
      - 6 children (Note: The 6 children are: Agnes Choa Wai-chung (蔡慧中), Mollie Choa Wai-woon (蔡慧媛), Phyllis Choa Wai-chun (蔡慧真), Leatrice Choa Wai-hung (蔡慧鴻), Daisy Choa Wai-haam (蔡慧箴, by concubine), Gerald Choa Wing-yip (蔡永業, by concubine))
    - Flora Ho Pak-kin (何柏堅) ∞ Ng Chiu-yan (伍朝恩) {no issue}
    - Ho Pak-yin (何柏頤) {no issue}
    - Pensy Ho Pak-siu (何柏韶) {no issue}
    - Rebeca Ho Pak-fong (何柏芳) ∞ Peter Pang Sau-san (彭秀山)
      - 6 children (Note: The 6 children are: Jenny Pang Ki-ling (彭綺玲), Ruby Pang Yuen-ling (彭婉玲), Winnie Pang Cho-ling (彭楚玲), Becky Pang Tsui-ling (彭翠玲), Angela Pang Fook-ling (彭福玲), Peter Pang Kin-sing (彭建成))
    - Genevive Ho Pak-tuen (何柏端) {no issue}
    - Nancy Ho Pak-shui (何柏瑞) ∞ Lam Hin-kwong (林顯光) {no issue}
    - Rose Ho Pak-sheung (何柏嫦) ∞ Charles Ma Suen-hung (馬煊洪)
      - 3 children (Note: The 3 children are: Rosaline Ma Bo-chu (馬寶珠), Philip Ma Bo-kwong (馬寶洸), Christina Ma Bo-shan (馬寶姍))
    - Stella Ho Pak-ngor (何柏娥) ∞ Peter Mak Chi-hin (麥志顯)
      - Anthony Mak Shun-on (麥信安)
    - Ho Pak-bun (何柏奔) {no issue}
    - Ho Pak-ngan (何柏顏) {no issue}
    - Monica Ho Pak-woon (何柏媛) ∞ Philip Kwok Sang-choi (郭生材)
      - 2 children (Note: The 2 children are: Eric Kwok Shu-kin (郭澍堅), Serena Kwok Nga-sin (郭雅倩))
    - Grace Ho Pak-yung (何柏蓉, 1907–96, adopted) ∞ Lee Hoi-chuen (李海泉, 1901–1965)
      - Peter Lee Jung-sum (李忠琛, 1939–2008) ∞ Eunice Lam (林燕妮, 1943–2018), Mary Cheung (張瑪莉, 1952–)
        - 2 children
      - Bruce Lee Chun-fan (李振藩 or 李小龍, 1940–1973) ∞ Linda Lee Cadwell (1945–)
        - Brandon Lee (李國豪, 1965–1993)
        - Shannon Lee (李香凝, 1969–)
      - Robert Lee Jun-fai (李振輝, 1948–) ∞ Sum Sum (黎小斌, 1951–)
        - 1 son
      - 2 older daughters: Phoebe Lee (李秋源, 1937-2026) and Agnes Lee Chan (李秋鳳, 1939-2025) (Note: The 5 children are: Pheobe Lee Chau-yuen (李秋圓), Agnes Lee Chau-kan (李秋勤), Peter Lee, Bruce Lee, Robert Lee)

==== Other family members ====
- Kwok Hing-yin (1818–80, 郭興賢) ∞ Sze Tai
  - Ho Sui-ting (何瑞亭, 1868–1942, adopted surname of Kwok) ∞ Wong Kam-fuk (黃金福, 1870–1931)
    - 9 children (Note: The 9 children are: Wong Sik-lam (黃錫霖), Wong Sik-to (黃錫滔), Wong Sik-man (黃錫文), Wong Sik-chung (黃錫松), Rose Wong Wai-yin (黃煒賢), Pansy Wong Wai-yu (黃煒茹), Wong Sik-kuen (黃錫權), Jasmine Wong Wai-sheung (黃煒嫦), Wong Sik-hon (黃錫漢))
  - Ho Pak-kuen (何柏娟, initially adopted surname of Kwok)
  - Kwok Mou-chiu (郭茂超, remained with Kwok family)

== Notable persons ==
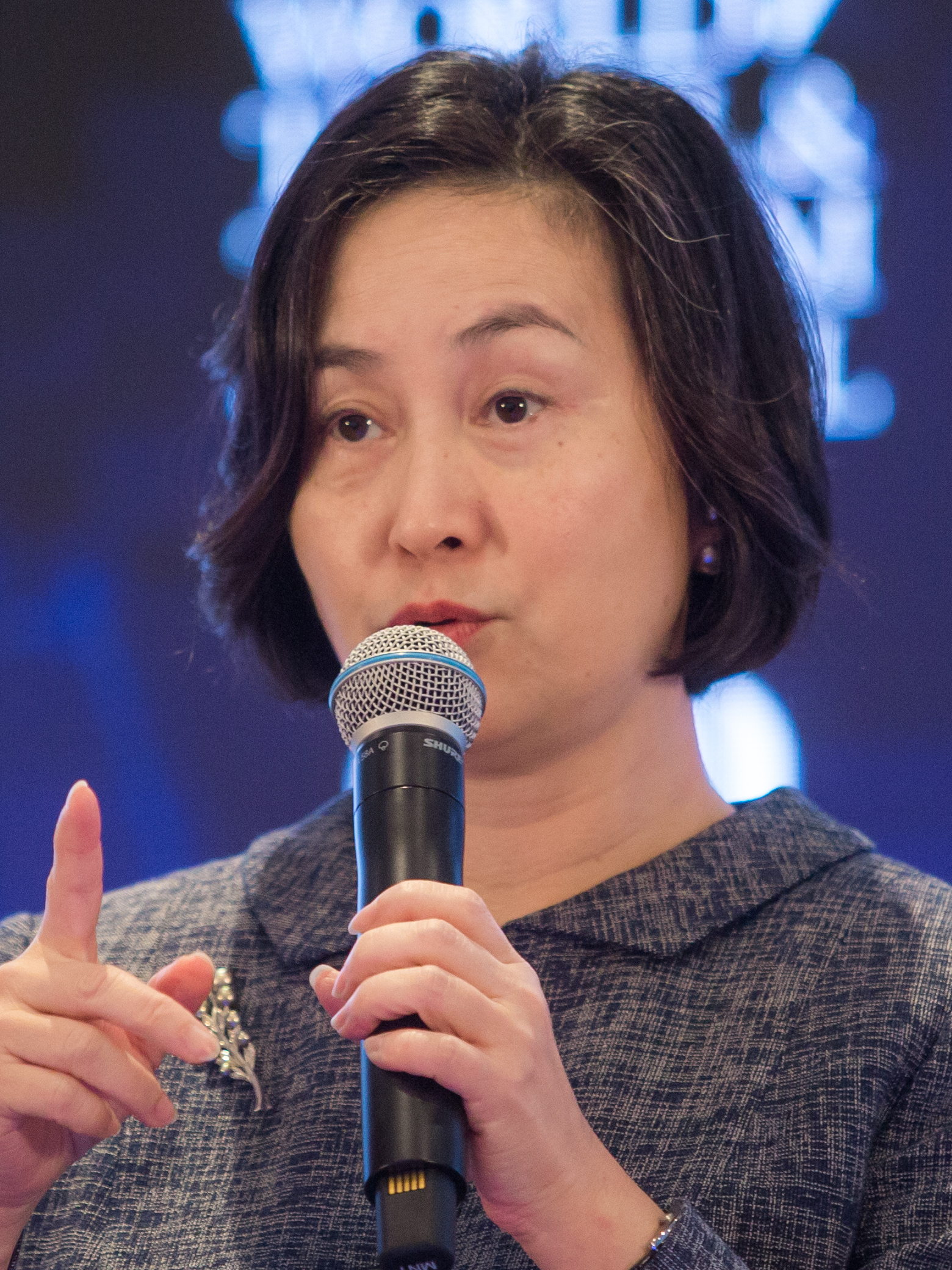
Pansy Ho in 2018

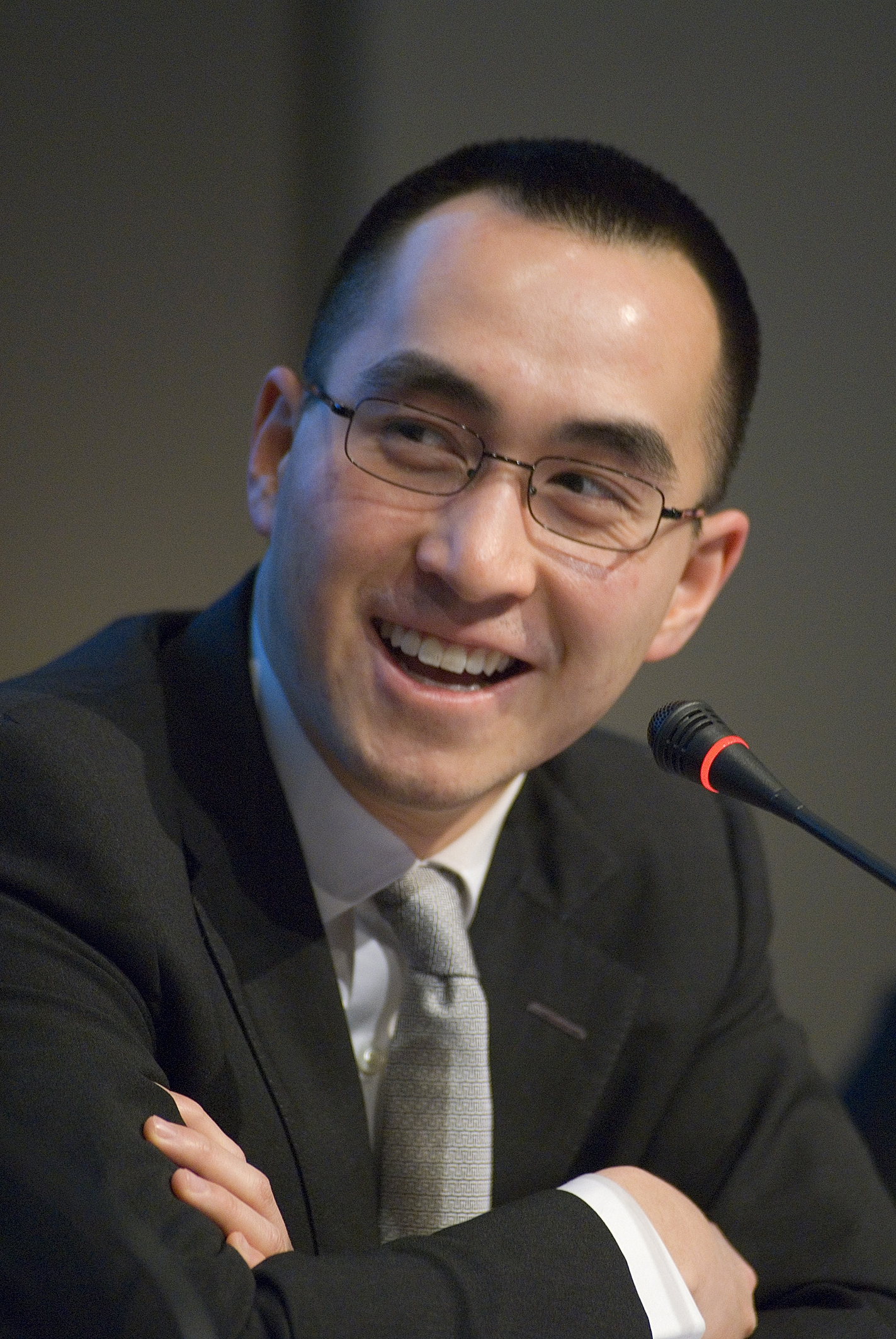
Lawrence Ho in 2007

=== Businesses ===
- Sir Robert Hotung – merchant known as "Grand Old Man of Hong Kong", awarded KBE in 1955
- Ho Kai-fook – comprador of Jardines and former Unofficial Member of the Legislative Council
- Ho Sai-wing – comprador of Hong Kong & Shanghai Bank
- Eric Hotung – businessman, awarded CBE in 2001
- Stanley Ho – businessman known as "King of Gambling", founder of Sociedade de Turismo e Diversões de Macau and Shun Tak Holdings, awarded GML in 2007, GBM in 2010, OBE in 1990, GCIH in 1995
- Pansy Ho – businesswoman and managing director of Shun Tak Holdings
- Daisy Ho – businesswoman and director of Sociedade de Turismo e Diversões de Macau
- Lawrence Ho – businessman and CEO of Melco International
- Mario Ho – chairman of NIP Group, co-owner of the Boston Celtics
- George Ho – media mogul and founding chairman of Commercial Radio, awarded GBS in 2001

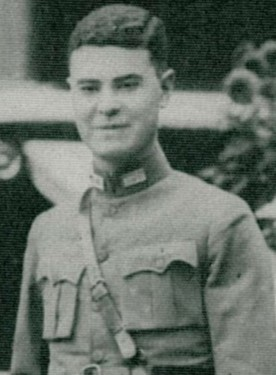
Ho Shai-lai, c. 1930s

=== Politics ===
- Ho Shai-lai – former army officer and later National Policy Advisors to President Chiang Kai-shek, awarded Order of the Sacred Tripod in 1948
- Eric Peter Ho – civil servant and former Secretary for Social Services, awarded CBE in 1981

=== Arts and culture ===
- Sir Joseph Hotung – art collector, first chairman of Hong Kong Arts Development Council and former trustee of British Museum, knighted in 1993
- Josie Ho – singer and actress

=== Medical ===
- Ho Sai-chuen – doctor and member of Sanitary Board
- John Ho Hung-chiu – radiologist and oncologist, awarded OBE in 1966

=== Others ===
- Irene Cheng, née Hotung – educationalist and first Chinese woman graduate of the University of Hong Kong, awarded OBE in 1961
- Robert Ho Hung-ngai – former journalist, awarded CM in 2018
