= Dhaneswar Khera Buddha image inscription =

Dhaneswar Khera
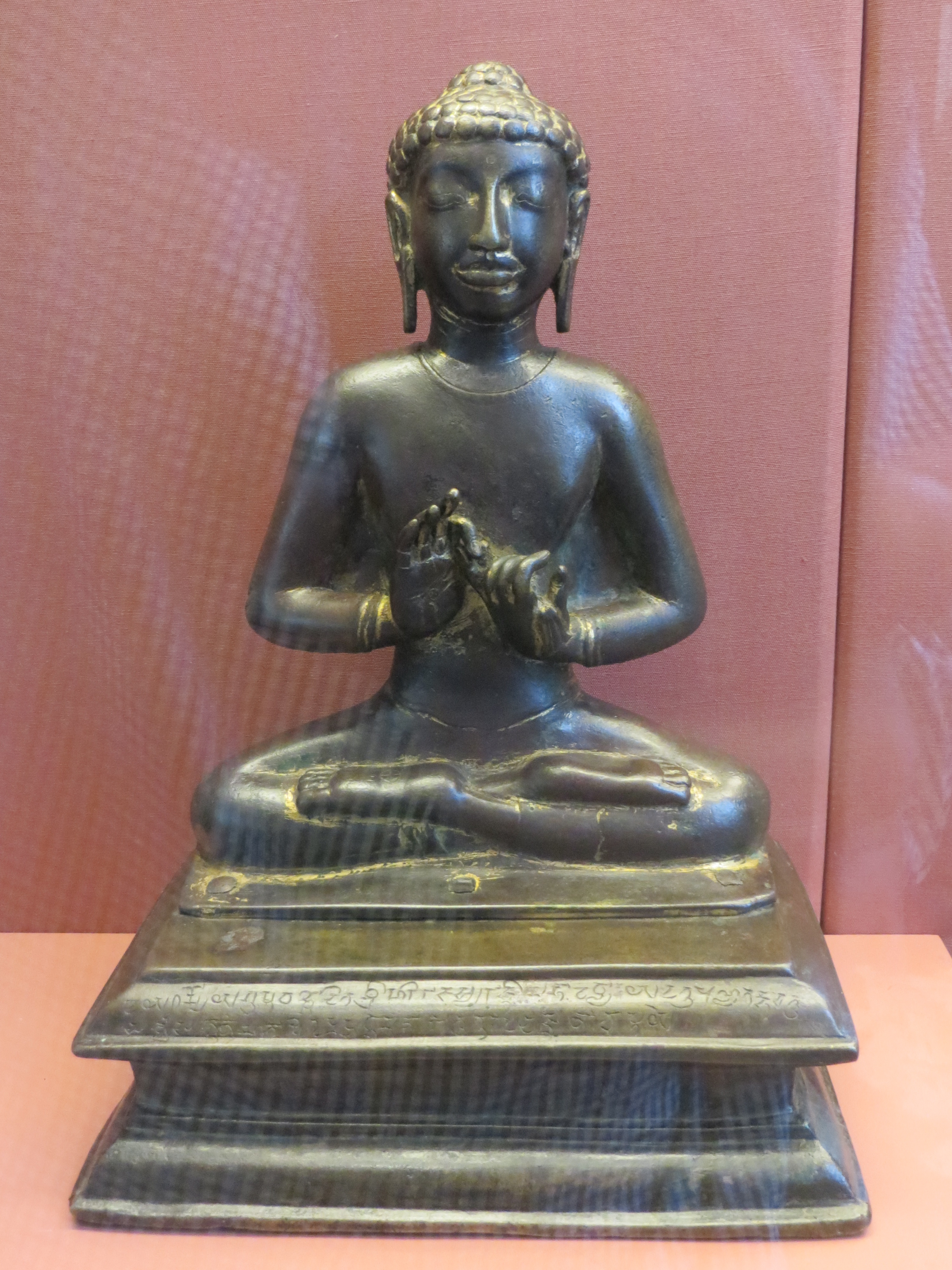
- The Dhaneswar Khera Buddha with Sanskrit inscription on display in the British Museum

- Location in Uttar Pradesh, India Dhaneswar Khera (Uttar Pradesh)
- Coordinates: 25.28°N 80.57°E
- Country: India
- State: Uttar Pradesh
- District: Banda
- Elevation: 124 m (407 ft)

The Dhaneswar Khera Buddha image inscription is an epigraphic record on the base of a bronze image of the Buddha recording its dedication by the wife of Harirāja of the Gupta lineage. The inscription provides an important documentation on the local Gupta dynasty and has been dated to the early 5th Century AD, or early 6th century AD.

== Discovery ==
Dhaneswar Khera (sometimes also referred to as Danesar Khera) is located near the village of Icchāwar or Nicchāwar in Jaspura Tahsil, Banda District, Uttar Pradesh, India. The bronze statue was discovered in the nineteenth century with two others and published by William Hooey and Vincent Arthur Smith in 1895. Since 1969 it has been kept in the British Museum where it is displayed in the Sir Joseph Hotung Gallery for China and South Asia. The other two statues from the hoard are in the Bangkok National Museum and the Nelson Atkins Museum of Art in Kansas City.

== Inscription ==
The inscription is written in Sanskrit on the pedestal of the sculpture. It was first noted in 1949 and subsequently published by D. C. Sircar in Epigraphia Indica. The record was later discussed by P. L. Gupta.

== Translation ==
A literal translation of the text is below:

1) deya-dharmmo=ya[ṃ*] Gupta=vaṅśo [read: vaṃś]-odita-śrī-Harirājasya ra [read: rā]jñī-mahādevyā[ḥ] [|*] yad=attra puṇya[ṃ*] tad=bhavatu

2) sa[rvva]-sa[TV(ttvā)nā][ṃ*] māta(tā)-pitṛ-pū[rvva]ṅgama(me)na anuttara-pada-jñāna (n-ā)vāptaye [||*]

The inscription records that the statue of the Buddha was the meritorious gift (deyadharma) of Mahādevī, the queen of Harirāja. The ruler Harirāja is described as being ‘born in the Gupta lineage’ who is also recorded on a copper-plate charter from Vārānasī.
