= Chiu Yuen Cemetery =

Cemetery in Hong Kong

Coordinates: 22.275943°N 114.129065°E

- Traditional Chinese: 昭遠墳場
- Simplified Chinese: 昭远坟场
Transcriptions
Standard Mandarin
- Hanyu Pinyin: Zhāo Yuǎn Fénchǎng
Yue: Cantonese
- Yale Romanization: Chīu yúhn fàhn chèuhng
- Jyutping: Ciu1 jyun5 fan4 coeng4

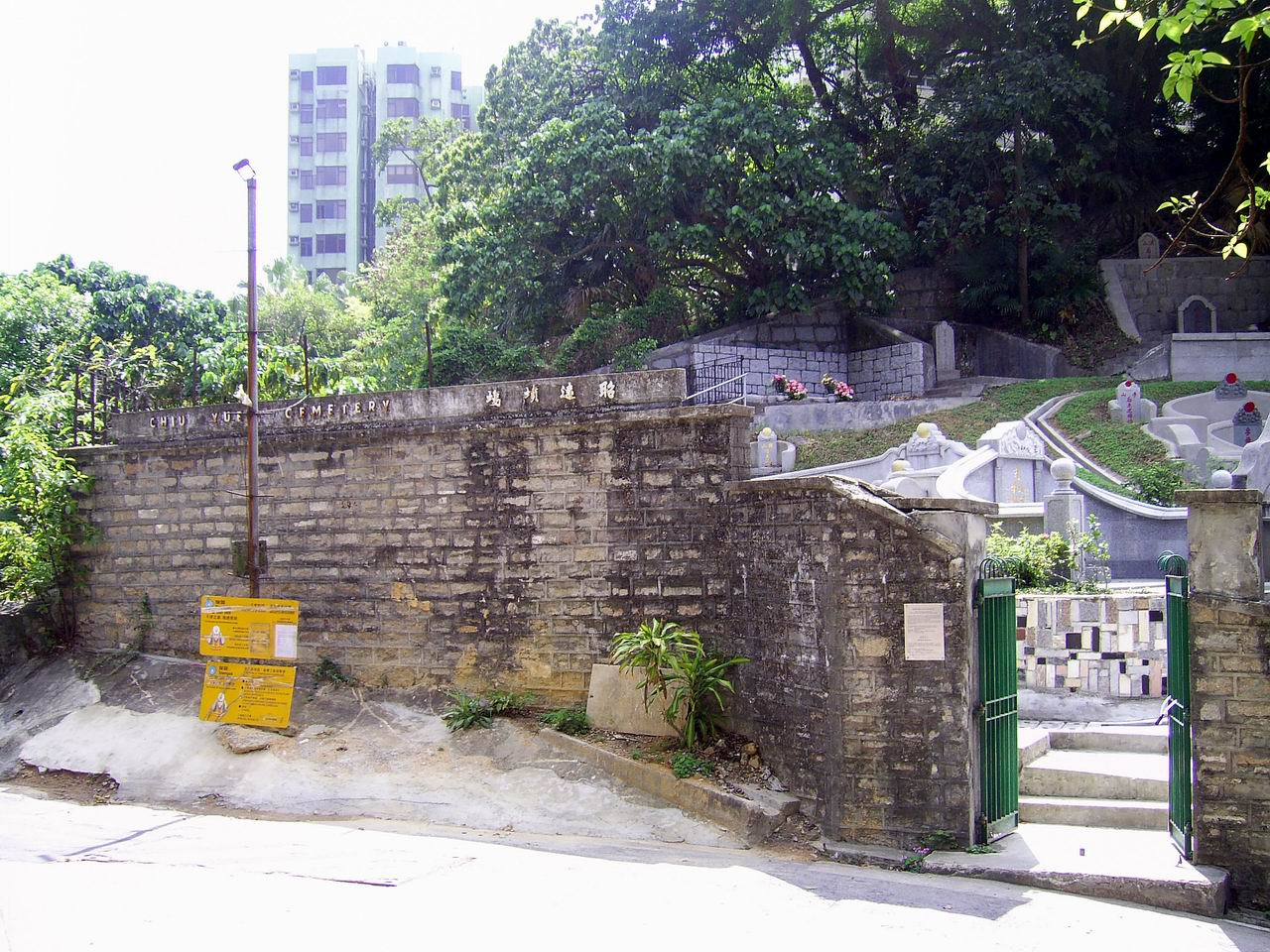
Chiu Yuen Cemetery

Chiu Yuen Cemetery is a private cemetery located on Mount Davis, on Hong Kong Island, Hong Kong.

== History ==
The cemetery was established in 1897 under the initiative of Sir Robert Ho Tung and Ho Kam Tong. It was the only cemetery in Hong Kong created exclusively for members of the local Eurasian community.

A World War II pillbox is located within Chiu Yuen Cemetery.

== Notable burials ==
- Clara Cheung Lin-kok (1875–1938), wife of Robert Hotung
- Victoria Lo, daughter of Robert Hotung
- Henry Hotung, son of Robert Hotung
- Daisy Hotung, daughter of Robert Hotung
- Edward Hotung, son of Robert Hotung
- Eva Hotung, daughter of Robert Hotung
- Robert Hotung, Ho Shai-lai, son of Robert Hotung
- Grace Lo, daughter of Robert Hotung
- Mary Wong, daughter of Robert Hotung
- George Ho, son of Robert Hotung
- Bobbie Kotewall (1916–1996) – Principal of SPCC (1952–1984), daughter of Robert Kotewall British Hong Kong civil servant and businessman.

== See also ==
- List of cemeteries in Hong Kong
