= Li Wei-ling =

Hong Kong journalist

- Chinese: 李慧玲
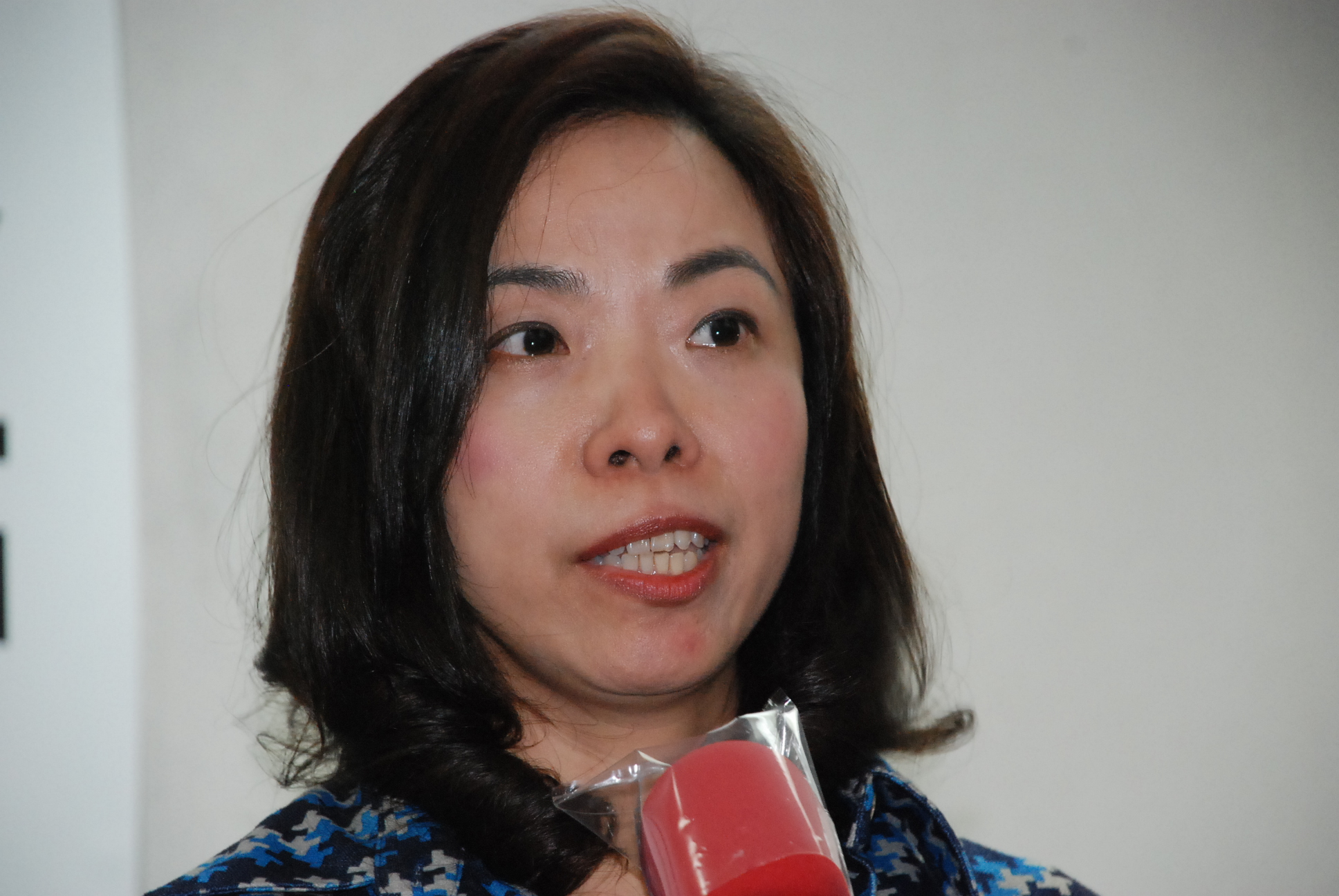
- Li Wei-ling in 2014
- Born: October 4, 1965 (age 60)
- Occupations: Journalist, Radio talk show host
- Spouse: Ex-husband: Ho Wing-hong

Chinese name
- Traditional Chinese: 李慧玲
Transcriptions
Standard Mandarin
- Hanyu Pinyin: lei5 wai6 ling4

Li Wei-ling (born 4 October 1965) is a radio talk show host in Hong Kong. Apart from her experience as a journalist in Ming Pao, Next Media and Commercial Radio, she contributes column articles to AM730 and Ming Pao.

== Career ==
=== Ming Pao career 1986 - 2001 ===
Upon graduation in 1986, Li Wei-ling started her first journalist career in Ming Pao reporting about politics. Despite having no professional training, she possessed great news sense and made herself known in the industry very quickly by reporting many exclusive articles.

=== Next Media / Apple Daily career 2001 - 2004 ===
Li Wei-ling joined Next Media as Apple Daily's deputy managing editor.

=== Commercial Radio Hong Kong career 2004 - 2014 ===
Li joined Commercial Radio Hong Kong on 1 June 2004.

On 12 February 2014, CRHK announced immediate termination of the employment contract with Li. CRHK refused to comment on the termination of contract.

Li's office was forcibly cleared. During Li's hosting of talk radio on CRHK, her opinion always directed against the Hong Kong Government and the mainland China. While she was supported by the Hong Kong pan-democracy camp, her talk show was criticized by pro-establishment camp as "inadequate neutrality" and "extreme" opinion. On 13 February 2014, Li held a press conference telling her own feeling and claiming "the suppression of freedom of the press and freedom of speech by the CY Leung administration" was behind her dismissal.

While AFP was reporting the Committee to Protect Journalists report about the deterioration of the freedom of the press in Hong Kong, Li's dismissal was used as an example to confirm the concern about the status of the press freedom.

== List of talk shows ==
- Green Paper Raiders (Chinese: 《綠皮書攻略》)
- Deep Talk (Chinese: 《無底深談》)
- The Tipping Point' (Chinese: 《左右大局》)
- On a Clear Day - Chaos (Chinese: 《在晴朗的一天出發 - 左右亂局》)
- On a Clear Day (Chinese: 《在晴朗的一天出發》)
