= Philip Cheung Wing-min =

Hong Kong educator

- 張榮冕
- Born: 4 March 1906; Xiangshan County, Guangdong Province, Qing dynasty
- Died: July 3, 1985 (aged 79); Hong Kong
- Occupation: Educator

Philip Cheung Wing-min, OBE^{[?]} (4 March 1906 – 3 July 1985) was a Hong Kong educator and educational administrator who served as the founding principal of Grantham Training College from 1951 to 1961.

Cheung served as the principal of Grantham Training College for ten years and oversaw its relocation to the Gascoigne Road campus in Yau Ma Tei, Kowloon, in 1952, laying the foundation for the college's early development. At the time, the college only offered a one-year primary school teacher's diploma course. The student body grew from an initial 61 students to over 300 in 1956. Among the many students he taught was the prominent politician and activist Szeto Wah.

Cheung graduated from the University of Hong Kong and joined the Education Department of the Hong Kong Government in 1929. The following year, he was sponsored by the government to pursue further studies at the University of Oxford in the United Kingdom for two years. After returning to Hong Kong, he taught science at the government-run King's College. Following the fall of Hong Kong in 1941, Cheung assisted the British military forces. After the war, he rejoined the Education Department in 1948 as an Inspector of Vernacular Schools.

Cheung's father, Cheung Chung-kau, was a wealthy merchant in Macau with ancestral roots in Xiangshan County, Guangdong. Together with his nephew Cheung Sau-bo, they were prominently known as the "Two Cheungs of Nanping". His wife, Margaret Cheung Tse Cho-yien, was a descendant of the prominent Hong Kong tycoon Ho Kom-tong. She worked alongside her husband in the Education Department and served as the founding principal of the Ho Tung Technical School for Girls.

== Biography ==
=== Family background ===
Philip Cheung Wing-min's ancestral home was in Nanping, Xiangshan (the predecessor of Zhongshan), Guangdong. He was born in his ancestral hometown of Xiangshan County on 4 March 1906. The Cheung family originally hailed from Qujiang County in northern Guangdong before moving to Xiangshan, and Cheung's particular branch later settled in Macau, where they accumulated great wealth through trade and became a prominent local clan. Cheung's grandfather, Cheung Kin-see (1838–1893), had conducted business in Hong Kong; while his father, Cheung Chung-kau (12 June 1870 – 26 June 1950), also known by his courtesy name Yougong, given name Jaci, and dharma name Guanyuan, was the second son of Cheung Kin-see and a prominent Macau merchant alongside his eldest brother, Cheung Sum-woo. During the late Guangxu era, Cheung Chung-kau joined his nephew Cheung Sau-bo (later Venerable Guanben) in promoting the Reform Movement in Macau, earning them the moniker "Two Cheungs of Nanping". Cheung Chung-kau had six sons and two daughters; besides Philip Cheung Wing-min, his other sons were Cheung Wing-lai, Cheung Wing-fan, Cheung Wing-heung, Cheung Wing-tung, and Cheung Wing-pou, while his two daughters were named Cheung Yuen-yuen and Cheung Yuen-tsing.

Many members of the Cheung family were heavily involved in education. For instance, Cheung's father, Cheung Chung-kau, co-founded the Yuansheng Academy with Cheung Sau-bo and others in Macau in 1894 to teach modern knowledge. Cheung Sum-woo's eldest son, Cheung Wing-kue, served as a board member of Hong Kong's St. Stephen's College, and his wife, Cheung Chan Yee-ching, was the founding principal of Hong Kong's Heep Yunn School. Furthermore, Cheung Sum-woo's third son, Cheung Wing-yau, was also an educator; his fourth son, Cheung Wing-ngai, was a chief instructor at St. James' Settlement in Hong Kong; and his fifth son, Assistant Bishop Cheung Wing-ngok, served as the principal of St. Stephen's College Preparatory School.

=== Educational career ===
In his youth, Cheung was sent by his family to study at St. Joseph's College in Hong Kong. He later entered the University of Hong Kong, majoring in education, and graduated with a Bachelor of Arts degree in 1928. Following his graduation, he joined the Education Department of the Hong Kong Government as a Graduate Master in 1929. The following year, he was sent by the Hong Kong Government to the University of Oxford in the United Kingdom for advanced studies, majoring in chemistry. During this period, he co-published a paper titled "The Photodecomposition of Chlorine Dioxide Solutions" with E. J. Bowen (1898–1980) in the Journal of the Chemical Society in 1932, and graduated with a Bachelor of Science degree in the same year. Upon returning to Hong Kong, Cheung taught science at the prestigious government school King's College, gaining extensive teaching experience over the years.

Following the fall of Hong Kong on 25 December 1941, Cheung successfully escaped from occupied Hong Kong. He initially retreated to Guilin with the British forces, where he served as a professor of chemistry at National Guangxi University. In 1944, when Guilin fell to the Imperial Japanese Army, Cheung moved with the British forces to India, where he served as a translator for Force 136 under the Special Operations Executive until the end of World War II in 1945. Having earned the trust of the colonial government through his wartime service, Cheung returned to the Education Department after the liberation of Hong Kong, assuming the post of Inspector of Vernacular Schools on 1 April 1948. The following year, he took on the concurrent role of member of the Special Committee to Investigate Political Activities in Schools, tasked with ensuring that local educational institutions remained free from political interference.

=== Principal of Grantham Training College ===
In September 1951, the Governor of Hong Kong, Sir Alexander Grantham, founded Grantham Training College (commonly known as "Grantham", which was later merged into the Hong Kong Institute of Education in 1994) named after himself, in order to address the acute shortage of primary school teachers in post-war Hong Kong. Cheung was appointed as the college's inaugural principal. His rank was upgraded to Senior Education Officer in 1952, and he was further promoted to Senior Principal in 1957, a rank equivalent to an Assistant Director of Education.

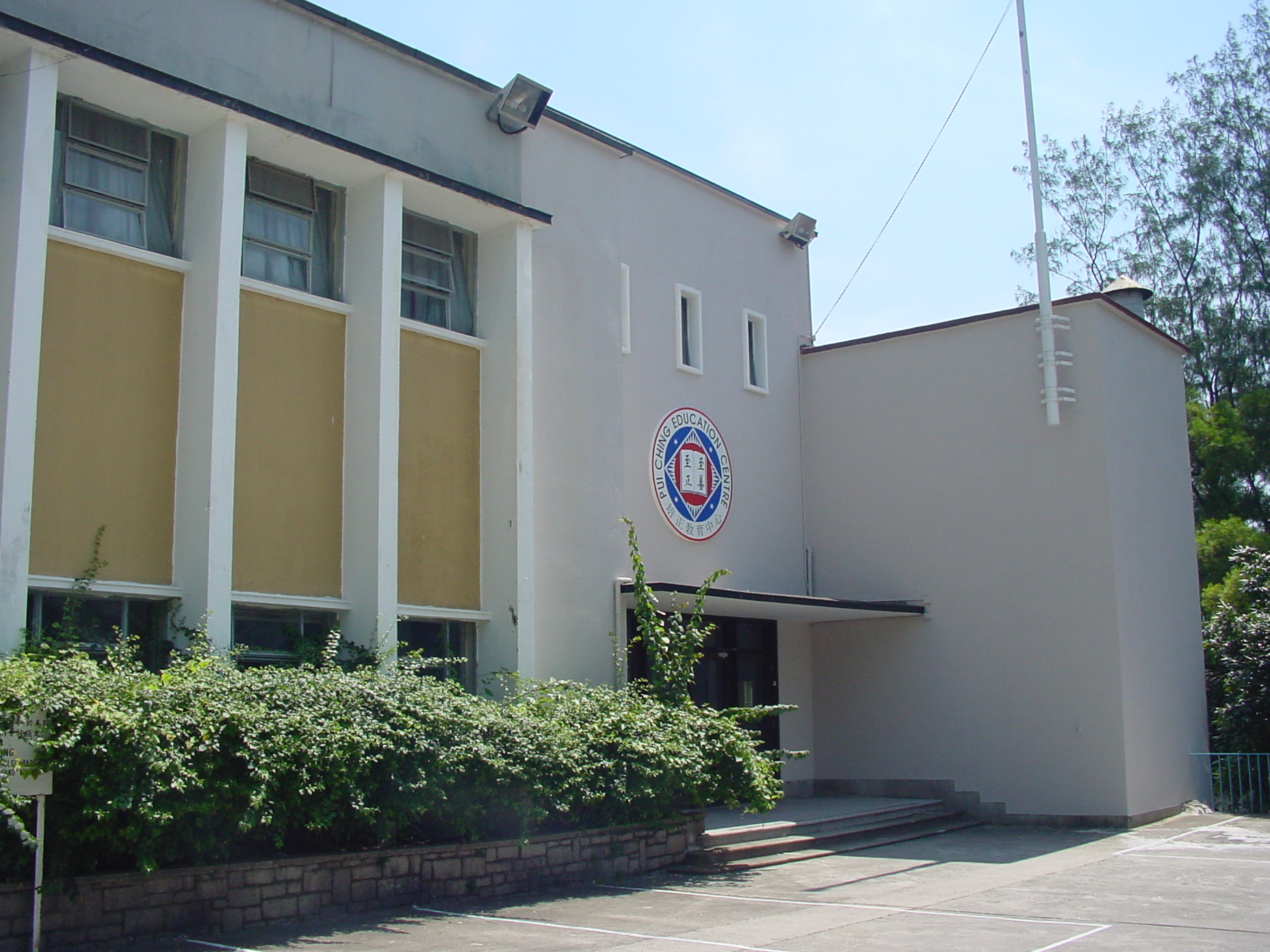
The campus of Grantham Training College originally located on Gascoigne Road in Yau Ma Tei. After the college was merged into the Hong Kong Institute of Education, the site was temporarily used by the Pui Ching Education Centre (the photo shows the site during its occupancy by the Pui Ching Education Centre, where the original Grantham crest above the main entrance was replaced by the Pui Ching crest)

Cheung exercised a profound influence on the early development of the college. Under his direction, the college initially borrowed the premises of King's College before relocating in May of the following year to a brand new, large-scale campus on Gascoigne Road in Yau Ma Tei, Kowloon. The new campus featured a main hall, lecture theatres, demonstration classrooms, a library, natural science laboratories, domestic science rooms, handicraft workshops, and a gymnasium. In its early years, Grantham only offered a one-year primary teacher's certificate course. While enrollment stood at just 61 students during its first year in 1951, it rapidly expanded to over 120 students by 1953. In the same year, the Hong Kong Government Rural Training College ceased operations, and its students were absorbed by Grantham, pushing numbers even higher to over 300 students by 1956. To cope with the surging student population, Cheung also arranged to borrow the nearby Methodist School premises to run evening classes.

At the inception of the college, Cheung visited the United Kingdom to observe its teacher training systems. Under his stewardship, Grantham's early curriculum required students to take core courses in Chinese, mathematics, social studies, natural science, audio-visual instruction, demonstration and criticism teaching, teaching practicum, and General English, along with electives in fine arts, music, home economics, and woodwork. All courses were taught using Chinese as the medium of instruction. It was only after Cheung stepped down in 1961 that Grantham introduced a two-year curriculum in 1966 to meet practical needs, followed by a three-year curriculum in 1968. Furthermore, in 1952, Cheung witnessed the establishment of the Grantham Training College Alumni Association. Among the many students he personally nurtured was Szeto Wah, who later became the principal of the Grantham Alumni Association Kwun Tong School, the founding chairman of the Hong Kong Professional Teachers' Union (HKPTU) and the Hong Kong Alliance in Support of Patriotic Democratic Movements of China, and an elected member of the Legislative Council. According to Szeto Wah's recollections, although Cheung's background was in chemistry, he possessed a keen interest in modern literature. Every week, he personally taught "Art Appreciation", lecturing on the works of modern literary masters such as Qian Zhongshu and Zhu Ziqing. He also repeatedly encouraged and assisted students in staging plays by Oscar Wilde, including public performances of Lady Windermere's Fan.

Cheung held the reins at Grantham for ten years until he stepped down as principal in 1961 to begin his retirement, with the vacancy filled by the promotion of Vice-Principal Woo Hei-tak. In January of that year, the Education Department hosted a farewell banquet at a Chinese restaurant on Des Voeux Road Central in Central to honor Cheung, along with the concurrently retiring Principal of Queen's College, H. N. Williamson, and Senior Education Officer Leung Fung-ki. The event was attended by the Director of Education, D. J. S. Crozier; to commend Cheung for his outstanding contributions to education, the British Crown appointed him an Officer of the Order of the British Empire (OBE) in the 1961 New Year Honours list.

=== Later life ===
Following his retirement, Cheung briefly remained in public service as the chairman of the Joint Establishment Board of Post-Secondary Colleges, a position he had held since 1959. He lived a low-profile life in his later years and passed away after an illness in Hong Kong on 3 July 1985 at the age of 79. His funeral was held at the Hong Kong Funeral Home on 7 July of the same year, and a memorial mass was celebrated by his family the following day at St. Joseph's Church on Garden Road. On 25 August of the same year, the Grantham Training College Alumni Association organized a large-scale memorial service in the college hall to commemorate his vital contributions to the founding and early years of the institution. The condolence donations collected during the service were subsequently used to establish the Principal Philip Cheung Wing-min Memorial Scholarship.

== Personal life ==
Philip Cheung Wing-min was a devout Catholic. He married Margaret Cheung Tse Cho-yien (1912–2013) on 28 March 1940 at St. Joseph's Church on Garden Road, and the couple had one daughter and three sons. Margaret Tse was a descendant of the wealthy Hong Kong tycoon Ho Kom-tong. Like her husband, she worked in the Education Department and served at the British military liaison office in Guilin during World War II. After the war, she became the founding principal of the Ho Tung Technical School for Girls and was appointed a Member of the Order of the British Empire (MBE) by the British Crown in 1967.

Career Highlights
- Graduate Master, Education Department (1929); Pursued further studies at the University of Oxford, UK (1930–1932); Taught at King's College (1932–1941); Taught at National Guangxi University (1942–1944); Translator for Force 136 (1944–1945); Inspector of Vernacular Schools, Education Department (1948–1951); Principal of Grantham Training College (1951–1961)

== Honors ==
=== Distinctions ===
- The full names and abbreviations of honors are listed below:
  - Officer of the Order of the British Empire (O.B.E.) (1961 New Year Honours list）

=== Things named after him ===
- Principal Philip Cheung Wing-min Memorial Scholarship: Awarded to students studying in primary schools run under the Grantham Training College Alumni Association.
- Grantham Alumni Association Principal Philip Cheung Wing-min Room: A student discussion room located on the 2nd floor of the Education University of Hong Kong Library. In 2004, the Grantham Training College Alumni Association donated HK$100,000 to the then Hong Kong Institute of Education to secure the naming rights.

== See also ==
- Grantham Training College
- Hong Kong Institute of Education
- Margaret Cheung Tse Cho-yien
- Szeto Wah
- Cheung Wing-kue

== Notes ==
Academic offices
Previous: New creation	Principal of Grantham Training College; 1951–1961	Next: Woo Hei-tak
