= Lions Gate Hospital =

Hospital in North Vancouver, British Columbia, Canada

- Vancouver Coastal Health
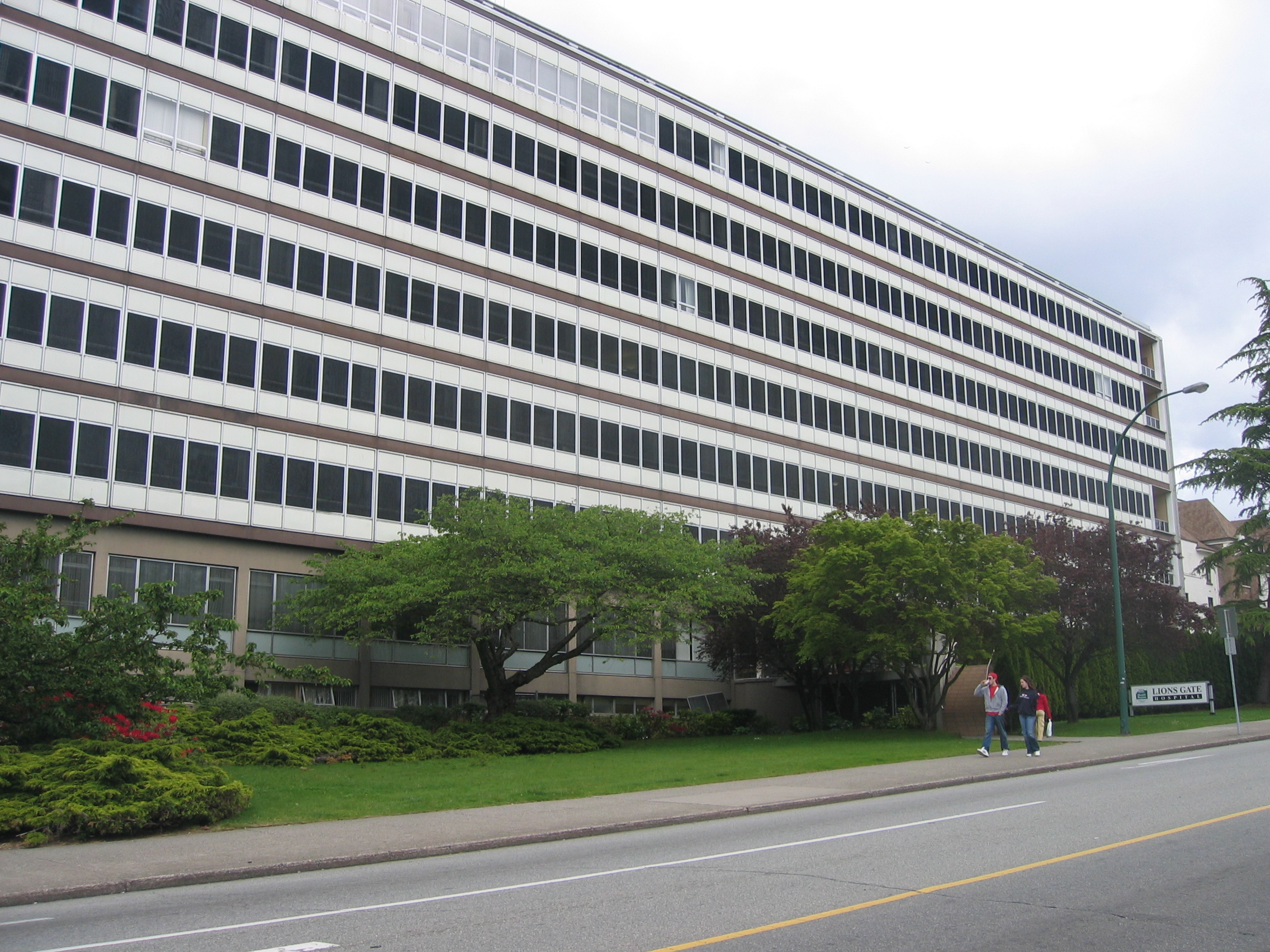

Geography
- Location: 231 East 15th Street, North Vancouver, British Columbia, Canada

Organization
- Care system: Public Medicare

Services
- Emergency department: Level III Trauma Centre
- Beds: 268

Links
- Website: www.vch.ca/en/location/lions-gate-hospital
- Lists: Hospitals in Canada

Lions Gate Hospital (LGH) is a 268-bed medical facility located in North Vancouver, British Columbia. The hospital is part of and operated by Vancouver Coastal Health (VCH), the regional health authority for the North Shore.

== History ==
The hospital formally opened on April 22, 1961. Opened in 2014, the Greta and Robert H.N. Ho Psychiatry and Education Centre (HOpe Centre) provides mental health services both at the hospital and in outpatient clinics. It is the fourth busiest hospital in Greater Vancouver, and one of only five neurosurgery centres in British Columbia proper.
