= Eric Peter Ho =

Hong Kong government official

Eric Peter Ho CBE, JP
- 何鴻鑾

Secretary for Social Services
- In office 12 April 1977 – 6 February 1983
- Governor: Sir Murray MacLehose; Sir Edward Youde
- Preceded by: Li Fook-kow
- Succeeded by: Henry Ching

Personal details
- Born: 30 December 1927 British Hong Kong
- Died: 25 March 2015 (aged 87) Norwich, Norfolk, England
- Spouse: Grace Irene Young
- Children: 3
- Parent(s): Ho Sai Ki; Doris Lo
- Education: University of Hong Kong

Eric Peter Ho Hung-luen
- Traditional Chinese: 何鴻鑾
- Simplified Chinese: 何鸿銮
Transcriptions
Standard Mandarin
- Hanyu Pinyin: Hé Hóngluán
Yue: Cantonese
- Jyutping: ho4 hung4 lyun4

Eric Peter Ho Hung-luen, CBE, JP (Chinese: 何鴻鑾; 30 December 1927 – 25 March 2015) was a Hong Kong government official. He was the Secretary for Social Services in the 1970s, becoming one of the first Chinese policy secretaries.

== Biography ==
Ho was born in Hong Kong on 30 December 1927 to the prominent Hotung family. Eric's grandfather Ho Fook was a prominent Eurasian compradore and philanthropist. He was the chief compradore to the Jardine, Matheson & Co. and unofficial member of the Legislative Council of Hong Kong. Eric's father Ho Sai Ki was the compradore of trading firm E. D. Sassoon. Eric's mother Doris Lo was sister of Sir Lo Man-kam, unofficial member of the Executive and Legislative Councils.

Eric Peter Ho was educated at the St. Joseph's College but his education was interrupted during the Pacific War and the Japanese occupation of Hong Kong. He attended the Wah Yan College, Hong Kong and then studied Economics at the University of Hong Kong. He also joined the Hong Kong Volunteer Defence Corps in 1948.

He was appointed Cadet Officer by the Hong Kong government in 1957. He worked as the Assisting Secretary for Chinese Affairs and then was appointed Assisting Secretary for the Office of the Unofficial Members of the Executive and Legislative Councils. In 1963, he was appointed Assisting Financial Secretary and official Justice of the Peace.

In 1968, Ho was appointed Deputy Director of Commerce and Industry and acted as Director of Commerce and Industry in 1973. On that capacity, he was also an official member of the Legislative Council. He became the Director of Home Affairs in 1973 and Secretary for Social Services in 1976. In the 1981 Birthday Honours, he was appointed a Commander of the Order of the British Empire (CBE).

He was appointed Secretary for Commerce and Industry in 1983 and unofficial member of the Executive Council in 1985. He was also a British representative in the Sino-British Liaison Group on the negotiation process the after the 1984 Sino-British Joint Declaration. He retired from the civil service in 1987. After his retirement, he was appointed chairman of the Public Service Commission until 1991.

He moved to the United Kingdom before 1997 and wrote a few books, including Times of Change and Tracing My Children's Lineage. On 25 March 2015, he died at the Hethersett Hall Care Home in Norwich, Norfolk, England. His wife, Grace Irene Tsin-kiu Young who died in 2007 was also a public figure, businesswoman of Yaumati Ferry and appointed member of the Urban Council.

== See also ==
- Four big families of Hong Kong

Government offices
| Preceded by Li Fook-kow | Secretary for Social Services; 1977–1983 | Succeeded by Henry Ching |
