= George Ho =

Hong Kong businessman

George Ho Cho-chi 何佐芝
- Born: 3 November 1919; United States
- Died: 4 June 2014 (aged 94); Hong Kong
- Other name: Ho Sai Yee (何世義)
- Education: King's College, Hong Kong; University of California, Berkeley
- Occupation: Entrepreneur
- Board member of: Commercial Radio Hong Kong
- Children: 1
- Parent: Robert Hotung

George Ho Cho-chi
- Chinese: 何佐芝
Transcriptions
Standard Mandarin
- Hanyu Pinyin: Hé Zuǒzhī
- Wade–Giles: Hó Tsǒ-chīh
Yue: Cantonese
- Yale Romanization: Ho4 Jo3ji1
- Jyutping: Ho4 Zo3zi1

George Ho Cho-chi, GBS, OBE, JP (3 November 1919 – 4 June 2014) was a Hong Kong media mogul. The fifth son of the influential businessman Robert Hotung, George Ho was the founder of the Commercial Radio Hong Kong and Commercial Television with his low key business partner, David Miao who was a major shareholder.

== Family and career ==
George Ho was the illegitimate son of Robert Hotung, then the most influential Eurasian compradore in Hong Kong, and Kate Archer. George was bequeathed a substantial amount of money directly and indirectly. His grandfather through Robert Hotung was a Jewish Dutch man, Charles Henry Maurice Bosman. George Ho studied at King's College, Hong Kong and the University of California, Berkeley.

Instead of joining the family flagship company, George Ho founded his own business, Commercial Radio Hong Kong by obtaining a radio broadcasting licence through the connections and HK$50,000 inheritance from his father. George Ho gradually became an influential tycoon in the colony. He branched out into television, founding Commercial Television in 1975. But the station closed three years later.

He had also been director of Jardine Matheson Holdings, Hongkong Land and Bank of East Asia.

In 2001, George Ho was awarded a Gold Bauhinia Star for his contribution to society.

George Ho had 2 children. His older daughter, Linda, attended St. Paul's Co-educational College and his son George, 2 years younger than Linda, attended St. Stephen's College in Stanley before attending St. Paul's Co-educational College at Form 6.

His son, George Joseph Ho, succeeded him as chairman of Commercial Radio.

== See also ==
- Hotung family
