= Modern literature =

Modern literature may refer to:

- Modernist literature, the literary form of modernism
- Xiandai wenxue, a Taiwanese literature journal in publication from 1960 to 1973

== See also ==
- Contemporary literature, literature with its setting generally after World War II
- Postmodern literature, post World War II literature characterized by techniques such as fragmentation, paradox, and the unreliable narrator
- Modern Kannada literature, in the Kannada language, spoken mainly in the Indian state of Karnataka
- Modern African literature
- Modern Arabic literature
- Modern Greek literature, in common Modern Greek, from the late Byzantine era in the 11th century AD
- Modern Tajik literature
- Modern world literature
