= Eric Hotung =

Hong Kong billionaire businessman, financier, and philanthropist

- Born: Eric Edward Hotung; June 8, 1926
- Died: September 20, 2017 (aged 91)
- Occupations: Businessman, financier, and philanthropist
- Parents: Edward Hotung (father); Alice Maud Newman (mother)
- Relatives: Robert Hotung (grandfather)

Eric Edward Hotung CBE (Chinese: 何鴻章, June 8, 1926 – September 20, 2017) was a Hong Kong billionaire businessman, financier, and philanthropist.

== Biography ==
Hotung was born to Robert Hotung's second son, Edward Hotung, and his wife, Alice Maud Newman (aka "Mordia O'Shea"), in 1926 in Hong Kong. His father founded the Chinese Gold and Silver Exchange in Hong Kong. His brother was art collector and philanthropist Sir Joseph Hotung.

He moved to Shanghai as a child and attended St. Francis Xavier's College. He returned to Hong Kong during World War II and worked in Tung Wah Hospital. After the Japanese invasion of Hong Kong, he returned to Shanghai with his family, which was put under house arrest by the Japanese.

Hotung went to the United States for his studies after the war, graduating from Georgetown University in 1951. He returned to Hong Kong in 1957 after the death of his father and grandfather, inheriting the family business.

Hotung maintained good relations with political leaders from around the world, including Chinese leaders Deng Xiaoping, Jiang Zemin, and Li Peng and United States Presidents Bill Clinton and Ronald Reagan. He also helped arrange Premier Zhu Rongji's trip to Washington, D.C. in 1990. He also helped negotiate the release of dissident physicist Fang Lizhi, who was seeking refuge in the U.S. Embassy in Beijing. He also campaigned for the release of Communist Party General Secretary Zhao Ziyang, who was put under house arrest for his sympathies with the demonstrators in Tiananmen Square in 1989.

During the 1999 East Timorese crisis, Hotung bought a former Australian navy ship, HMAS Moresby, to transport 12,800 East Timorese refugees back to their home. After the country became independent, Hotung was named its ambassador-at-large.

In 2000, Hotung made a $5 million donation to Georgetown University Law Center and founded the Eric E. Hotung International Law Center.

Hotung was named a Commander of the British Empire in 2001.

== Personal life ==
Hotung was married to U.S.-born Patricia Anne Shea. In his earlier life, he was known in Hong Kong for his love affair with his cousin, Winnie Ho Yuen-kin, a sister of gambling tycoon Stanley Ho. Hotung had eight children, including two with Winnie Ho. He was a resident at the Osborne Apartments in New York City.

He and Winnie Ho were sued in 2006 by their son, Anthony Hotung, who was not told of his interests in two family trusts upon turning 21. In 2012, Hotung was ordered by a Fairfax County, Virginia court to pay his son, Michael Hotung, $1.2 million for libel.

Hotung died on September 20, 2017.
