= Irene Cheng =

Hong Kong educationalist

Irene Cheng, née Hotung, also known as Tsi-dsi Irene Ho (October 21, 1904 – February 17, 2007; Chinese: 鄭何艾齡), was a Hong Kong educationalist. The first Chinese woman to graduate from the University of Hong Kong, she went on to become the highest-ranking woman in the city's Education Department. Throughout her career, she also worked as an educator in mainland China and in the United States.

== Early life and education ==
Irene Cheng was born Irene Hotung in 1904. She was the daughter of very wealthy Eurasian parents in Hong Kong. Her father, Robert Hotung, was a businessman and philanthropist known as the "grand old man of Hong Kong." Her mother was Hotung's second "co-equal" wife, Clara Hotung. Hers was the first non-white family to live in Hong Kong's elite Victoria Peak neighborhood.

After studying at the Diocesan Girls' School, in 1921 Cheng became one of the first women admitted to the University of Hong Kong. In 1925, she became the first Chinese woman to graduate from the university, earning a degree in English.

She then traveled to Britain to attend King's College London, but her education there was cut short due to family responsibilities; however, she eventually completed a master's in education at Columbia University's Teachers College in 1929. She later attended the University of London, Institute of Education, where she obtained a Ph.D. in 1936. In between, she returned to China in the early 1930s to teach at Lingnan University in Guangzhou.

== Career ==
Throughout her career, Cheng focused her efforts on education, first in China and later in the United States. She was a strong proponent of bilingual and special education.

While studying in London in the 1930s she founded the Chung Hwa Club in London's East End district of Limehouse, supporting the community of Chinese sailors and their mixed-heritage children. The club offered instruction in Chinese language and culture to the children, as well as non-academic activities and support to the whole community. After obtaining her Ph.D., she returned to China the year after and served on the staff of the Ministry of Education in Nanjing. In 1940, she married an engineer from Beijing, Cheng Hsiang-hsien, and they had a daughter. Two years into their marriage, her husband died. As was customary, Chang never remarried.

In 1948 she went to Hong Kong and began working in the city's Education Department, eventually rising to become the highest-ranking female staff member there. She also served on the executive board of the World Federation for Mental Health from 1956 to 1959.

Cheng retired from her position in the Education Department in 1961. For her service as an education officer, she was named an officer of the Order of the British Empire that year. For a few years after her retirement from government, she served as principal of the Confucian Tai Shing School in Hong Kong's Wong Tai Sin. In 1967, she moved to the San Diego area to be closer to where her daughter and other relatives were living.

Cheng wrote two memoirs chronicling her time in British Hong Kong: "Clara Ho Tung. A Hong Kong Lady: Her Family and Her Times" (1976), about her mother, and "Intercultural Reminiscences" (1997), an autobiography.

== Later years ==
In her retirement, Cheng continued her advocacy for educational opportunities, founding the Chung Hwa School, which taught Chinese culture, in San Diego in 1970. She also taught at the University of California, San Diego, in this period, as well as teaching citizenship and other classes for immigrants to the United States.

She died in 2007 at age 102.
