= Robert Hotung =

Hong Kong businessman (1862–1956)

Sir Robert Ho Tung KBE JP
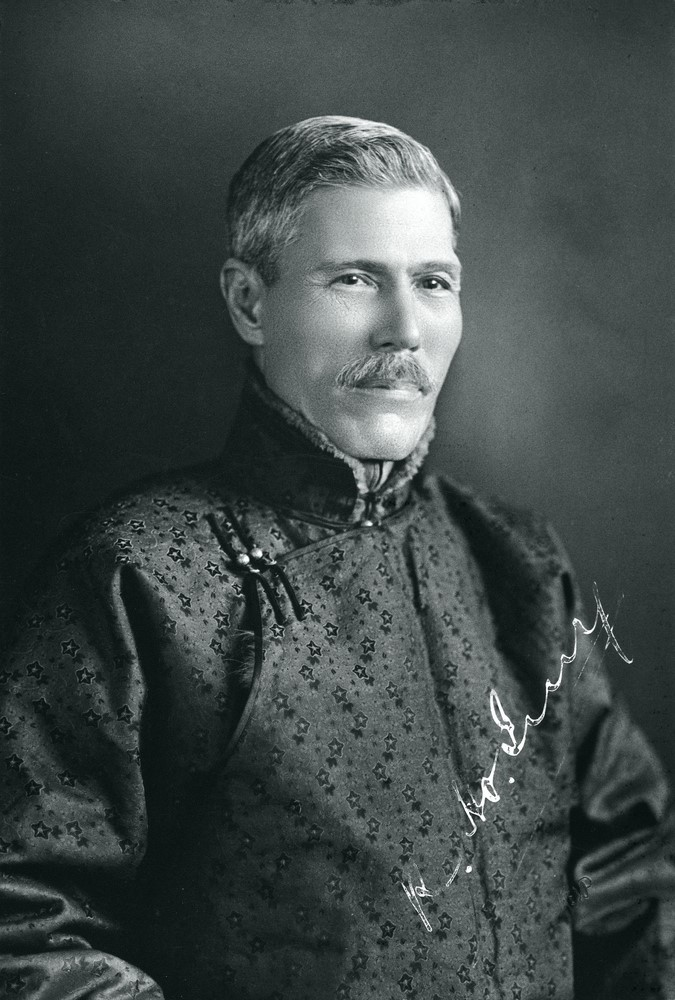
- Portrait of Sir Robert Ho Tung Bosman
- Born: Robert Ho Tung Bosman; 22 December 1862; Hong Kong Island, British Hong Kong
- Died: 26 April 1956 (aged 93); British Hong Kong
- Education: Queen's College
- Occupation: Merchant
- Spouses: Margaret Maclean (m. 1881) Clara Cheung Lin-kok (m. 1895)
- Children: 12, including George
- Parent(s): Charles Henry Maurice Bosman (father); Sze Tai (mother)
- Relatives: Ho Fook (brother); Eric Hotung (grandson); Joseph Hotung (grandson); Stanley Ho (grand-nephew); Grace Ho (niece); Bruce Lee (grand-nephew)

Signature
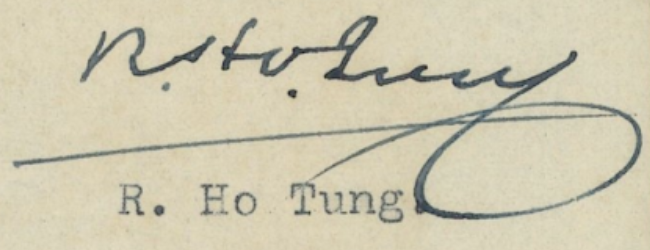

Robert Hotung
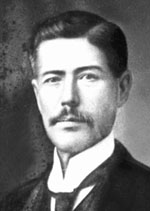
- Sir Robert Ho Tung in 1916
- Traditional Chinese: 何東
- Simplified Chinese: 何东
Transcriptions
Standard Mandarin
- Hanyu Pinyin: Hé Dōng
Yue: Cantonese
- Jyutping: Ho4 Dung1

Alternative Chinese name
- Traditional Chinese: 何曉生
- Simplified Chinese: 何晓生
Transcriptions
Standard Mandarin
- Hanyu Pinyin: Hé Xiǎosheng
Yue: Cantonese
- Jyutping: Ho4 Hiu2 Sang1

Second alternative Chinese name
- Traditional Chinese: 何啟東
- Simplified Chinese: 何啟东
Transcriptions
Standard Mandarin
- Hanyu Pinyin: Hé Qǐdōng
Yue: Cantonese
- Jyutping: Ho4 Kai2 Dung1

Sir Robert Ho Tung, KBE JP (Chinese: 何東; 22 December 1862 – 26 April 1956) was a Hong Kong businessman and philanthropist. Also known as "the grand old man of Hong Kong" (Chinese: 香港大老), he was knighted in 1915 (Knight Bachelor) and 1955 (KBE).

== Biography ==
Ho Tung was Eurasian. His father, Charles Henry Maurice Bosman (1839–1892), was of wealthy Jewish ancestry, while his Boat Dwellers mother was Sze Tai (施娣), born at present-day Shenzhen. His father was a merchant who owned Bosman and Co., was part-owner of the Hong Kong Hotel that opened in 1868, and was a director of the Hong Kong and Whampoa Dock Company. By 1869, Charles Bosman was also the Dutch consul, running his own marine insurance business with important clients that included the British-owned trading conglomerate Jardine, Matheson & Co.

He later left for England, where he became naturalised in 1888. In Cantonese, Bosman was pronounced Bo-se-man, which transliterated into Cantonese to become Ho Sze Man. When Robert Ho Tung travelled, he carried a certificate from the governor of Hong Kong stating that his father was Dutch. He was educated at Queen's College, Hong Kong (previously known as the Central School).

=== Career ===
After graduating from Queen's College in 1878, Ho Tung went to Canton, where he worked as a clerk for the Chinese Imperial Maritime Customs. In 1880, he returned to Hong Kong and joined Jardine Matheson as an assistant in the compradore department. His bilingual skills and business acumen eventually propelled him to become Head Compradore in 1894. Although he was of mixed parentage, Ho Tung considered himself Chinese, a fact reflected in his sartorial preference. By the age of 35, he was believed to be the richest man in Hong Kong. He was awarded an honorary Doctorate of Laws by the University of Hong Kong in 1916.

In 1927, his wife Clara expanded "The Falls", one of the four Peak houses owned by Ho Tung, into a sumptuous residence now known as Ho Tung Gardens at 75 Peak Road.

Ho Tung himself lived in a nearby house named The Neuk, although he did entertain visiting notables such as US vice-president John Nance Garner and playwright George Bernard Shaw at Ho Tung Gardens.

Ho Tung identified himself both as Chinese and as a permanent resident of British Hong Kong. He gave generously to Dr. Sun Yat-sen's campaigns to establish the Republic of China, but saw no contradiction in civic participation in British Hong Kong. As a millionaire with significant influence in the colony, he heavily emphasised to the British colonial administration that no part of the Chinese demographic were "purely indigenous". Many were "birds of passage" on their way to Southeast Asia, but many, like himself, became permanent residents, a testimony to their "faith in the permanent prosperity of the colony and the safety of domicile under the folds of the British flag".

Ho Tung was the director of many Hong Kong companies, including Hong Kong Land, and served on the boards of influential charitable organisations, including the Tung Wah Hospital. He was founder and first chairman of The Chinese Club, which was created in response to the Hong Kong Club's unofficial policy of excluding any non-Europeans from joining. His second wife, Clara, was a devout Buddhist. Through her educational charity, to which Sir Robert gave HK$100,000 on their 50th wedding anniversary in 1931, the Po Kok Day and Evening School and the Tung Lin Kok Yuen in Happy Valley were founded.

== Family ==
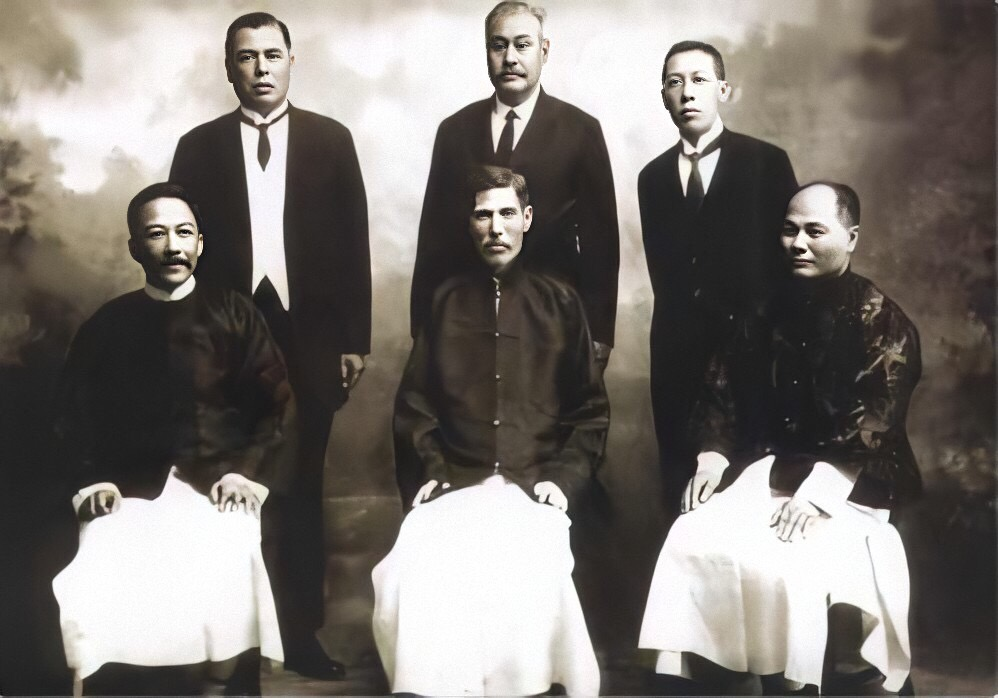
Ho Tung (seated, middle), his brother Ho Fook (left, standing) and his maternal half-brother Ho Kom-tong (seated, right)

Robert Ho Tung had four sisters and five brothers, including:

- Ho Fook (1863–1926), a younger brother, succeeded Robert as Head Compradore at Jardines in 1889. He had 13 sons, five of whom worked as compradores for various foreign companies. One of Ho Fook's grandsons was Stanley Ho, the casino and shipping magnate.
- Ho Kom-tong (1866–1950) was a younger maternal half-brother of Robert's. The son of a Chinese father, he was a prominent businessman and philanthropist who succeeded Ho Fook as Head Compradore at Jardines. He had 12 wives and reportedly more than 30 children. One of his children, Grace Ho Oi-yu (何爱瑜) (1907–1996), was the daughter of Cheung King-sin (張瓊仙), a Eurasian who was Ho Kom-tong's mistress in Shanghai. Grace was adopted by him and later became the mother of martial artist and actor Bruce Lee. Kom Tong Hall, the former Hong Kong residence of Ho Kom-tong, now houses the Dr. Sun Yat-sen Museum.

=== Marriage ===
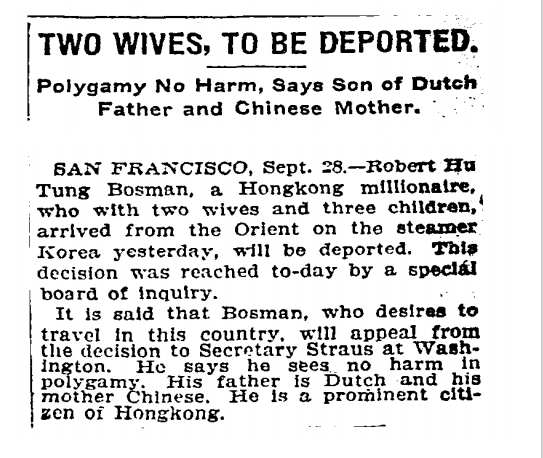
the New York Times reported in 1908 that "Robert Ho Tung Bosman... with two wives and three children.. will be deported"

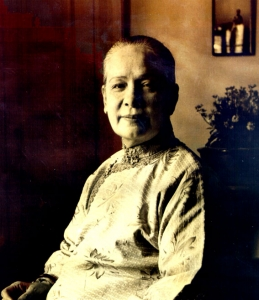
Ho Tung's second wife, Clara Cheung

At age 15, Robert was informally engaged to the Eurasian daughter of Hector Coll Maclean of Jardines, Margaret Mak (aka Maclean, 麥秀英; 1865–1944). They married when he was 18, and she was 16. Since she was unable to bear children, Robert adopted Ho Fook's first son, Ho Wing, following Chinese tradition, and took Chau Yee-man (周綺文) as a concubine in 1891. Still childless after three years (Chau Yee-man later gave birth to Mary Hotung (何純姿)), Margaret persuaded her maternal cousin Clara Cheung Lin-kok (張靜容 a.k.a. 張蓮覺; 1875–1938), to accept his hand as a "co-equal" wife; they married in 1895. Clara Ho Tung later gave birth to three sons and seven daughters.

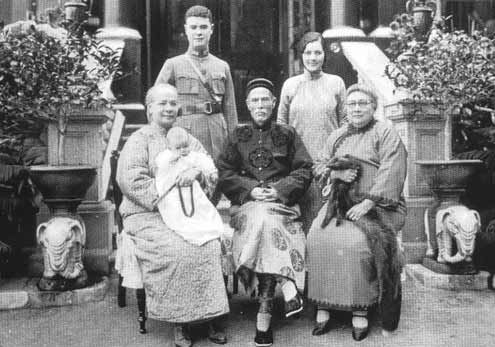
Sir Robert Hotung, with his two wives and son's family

Robert and Margaret were baptised as Christians late in life and interred at the Hong Kong Cemetery. The rest of his family, including Clara, are buried in the Eurasian cemetery, Chiu Yuen Cemetery, located on Mount Davis.

=== Progeny ===
Robert and Clara's eldest son, Edward Hotung (1902–1957), became a prominent banker and philanthropist in Hong Kong. He was a founder of the Chinese Gold and Silver Exchange in Hong Kong, as well as Treasurer of the Chinese War Chest in Shanghai during the Japanese occupation. He had two sons, Sir Joseph Hotung KBE (1930–2021) and Eric Hotung CBE (1926–2017); and two daughters, Mary Ketterer, who received the Royal Order of the Golden Ark for her work in conservation, and Antonia.

Joseph Hotung was a businessman, philanthropist and art collector who received an LLB from the University of London. He served on the boards of HSBC and Hongkong Electric Holdings Ltd, and was chair of the Arts Development Council in Hong Kong and member of the SOAS Governing Body. A trustee of the British Museum from 1994 to 2004, he funded the creation of two new galleries, including the Joseph E. Hotung Gallery of Oriental Antiquities.

Eric Hotung was a businessman and ambassador-at-large and economic advisor to Timor-Leste (East Timor). He was born in Hong Kong and grew up there and in Shanghai. Eric attended Georgetown University in 1947 and graduated in 1951. Afterwards, he worked at the New York Stock Exchange and at General Motors before returning to Hong Kong. He married Patricia Anne Shea and they had five sons and three daughters. He died in 2017, aged 91.

Robert and Clara's second son, Robbie Ho Shai-lai (1906–1998), was a general under the Kuomintang regime. He renounced his British nationality and became a Chinese citizen. He was also ambassador to Japan for the Republic of China from 1952 to 1956 and a member of the Nationalist China military delegation to the United Nations from 1956 to 1966. Robbie's son Robert Hung-Ngai Ho, a former journalist and publisher in Hong Kong, is the founder of the Tung Lin Kok-yuen Canada Society, a Buddhist charity. He resides in West Vancouver, Canada, and is a recipient of the Order of British Columbia for his philanthropic work in that province.

A third son, Henry, was born to Clara but died of tuberculosis when he was four.

Robert had another son, George Ho Cho-chi, born out of wedlock. George went on to become founder of Commercial Radio Hong Kong.

Robert and Clara's eldest daughter, Victoria, married Sir Man-kam Lo, a prominent Eurasian lawyer and legislator who was knighted by Queen Elizabeth II after World War II. Their son, Lo Tak-shing, was a former lawyer and legislator in Hong Kong who ran against Tung Chee Hwa in the elections for Chief Executive in 1997.

Three other daughters – Irene Cheng, Jean Gittins and Florence Yeo – wrote memoirs chronicling their war-time experiences in colonial Hong Kong. Jean Gittins migrated to Melbourne, Australia, after the War, where she worked in the Pathology Department of Melbourne University. She also wrote six books: I Was at Stanley, Eastern Windows – Western Skies, The Diggers from China, Stanley: Behind Barbed Wire, A Stranger No More and Prizes, Books and Papers (1879/1969).

Irene Cheng (1904–2007) was one of the first female undergraduate students admitted to study English at the University of Hong Kong in 1921. She went on to earn a Diploma in Education at King's College in London in 1925. In 1936, she received her PhD from the University of London. She is the author of Clara Ho Tung. A Hong Kong Lady: Her Family and Her Times and Intercultural Reminiscences.

Florence Yeo married Malaysian-born doctor K.C. Yeo and settled in the UK. Her memoir is called My Memories.

== Honours ==
He was appointed Knight Bachelor in 1915 and made a Knight Commander of the Order of the British Empire (KBE) in 1955.

He was a Justice of the Peace since 1889, Knight of Grace of St. John of Jerusalem (1925), Order of Christ of Portugal (promoted Grand Officer in 1930), First Class Order of the Excellent Crop with Sash of China 1922, Knight Commander of the Legion of Honour 1932, First Class German Red Cross Decoration 1932, Knight Commander of the Order of the Crown of Italy 1933, Knight Commander of the Crown of Leopold of Belgium 1933, and Knight Commander of the Imperial Order of the Dragon of Annam 1936.

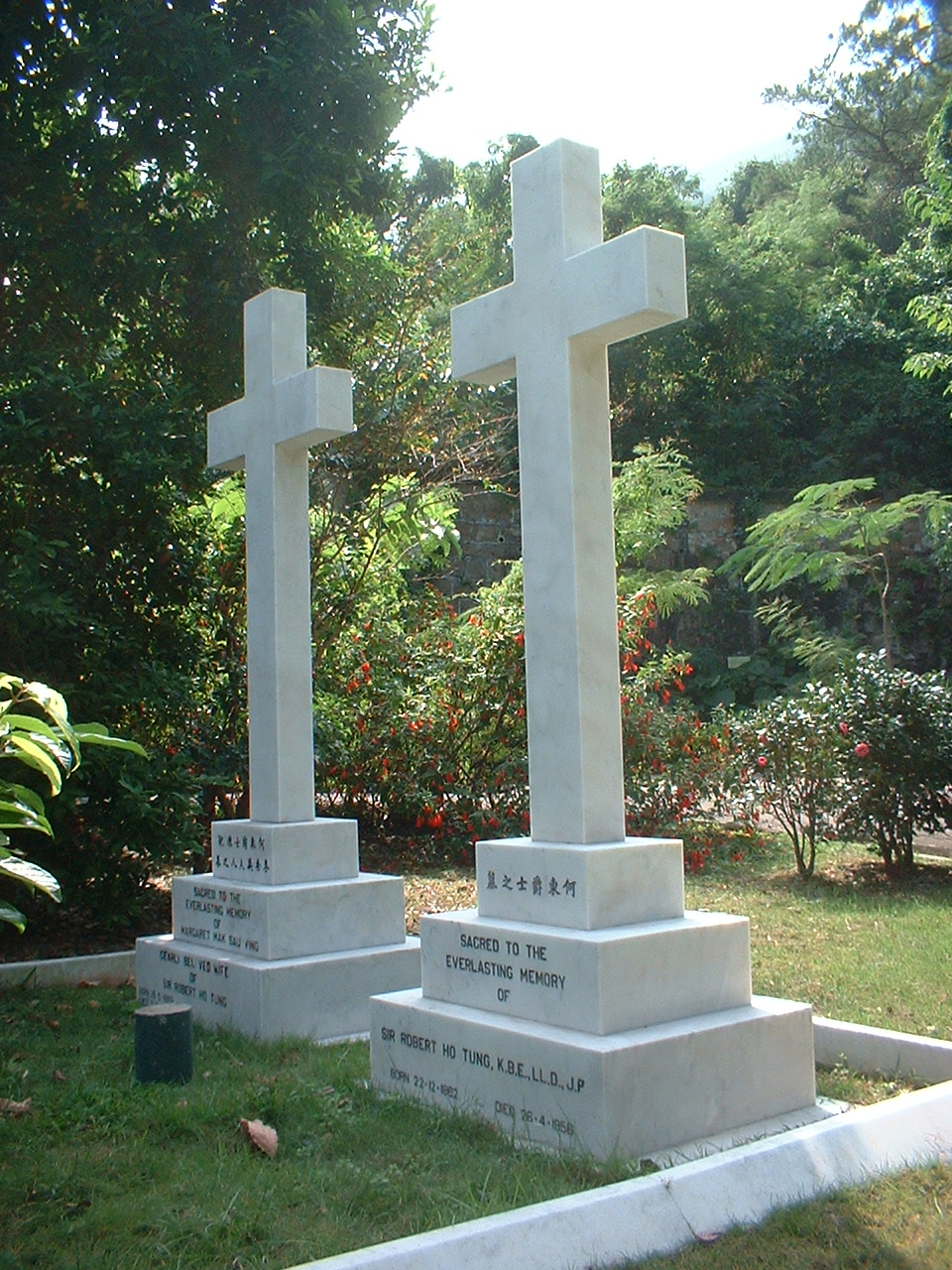
The grave of Ho Tung and Lady Margaret in Hong Kong Cemetery

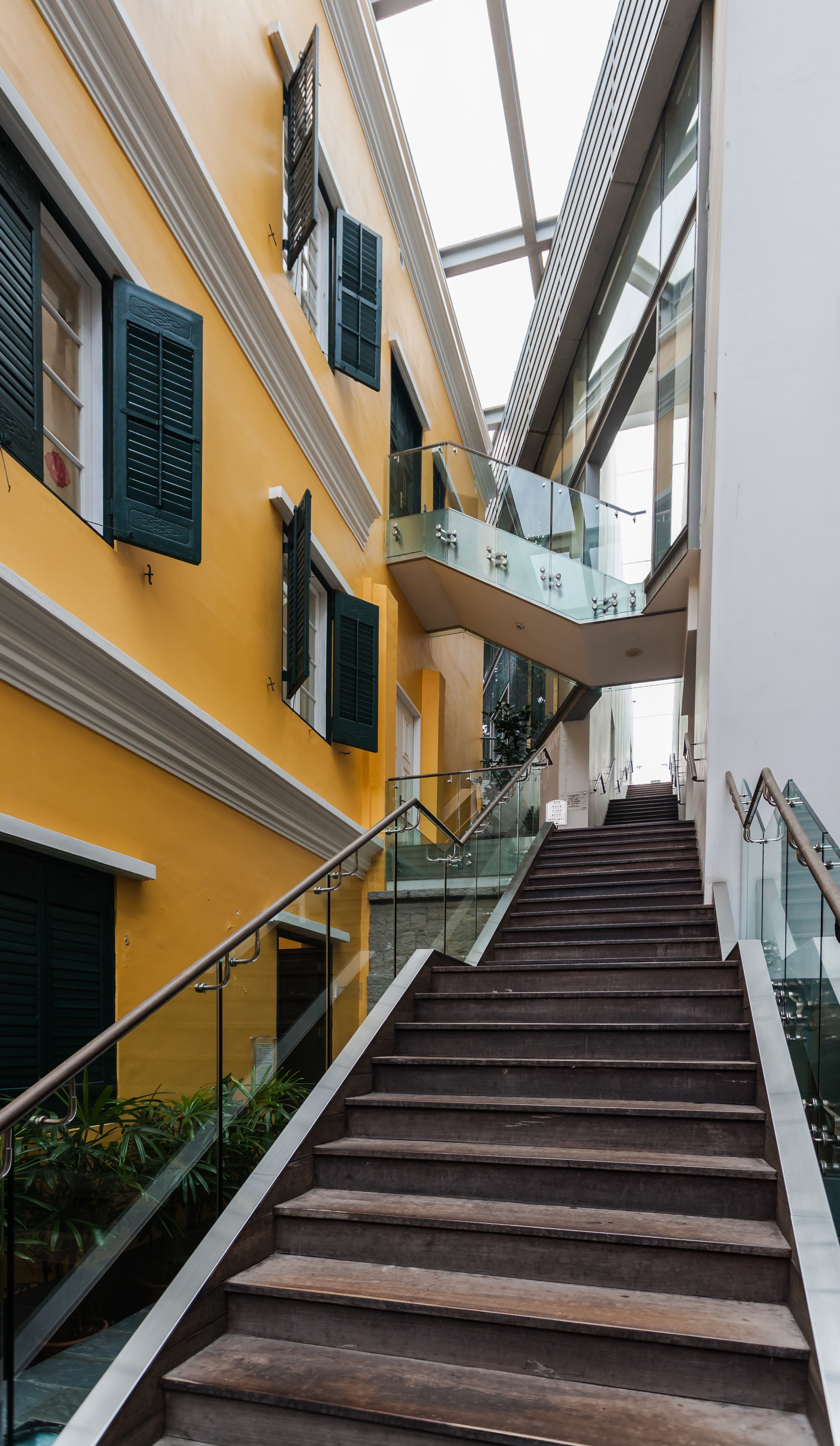
Sir Robert Ho Tung Library in Macau

There are many parks, schools, and buildings named after or founded by Robert Ho Tung in Hong Kong, including Lady Hotung Hall at Hong Kong University, Hotung Secondary School, Tung Lin Kok-yuen Buddhist temple, and King George V School.

In Macau, the Sir Robert Ho Tung Library is housed in a mansion once owned by Ho Tung, who resided there during the Japanese occupation of Hong Kong, under the protection granted by Portuguese neutrality in Macau. Also, there is a school named after him called Escola Primária Oficial Luso-Chinesa Sir Robert Ho Tung (何東中葡小學).

== See also ==
- Ho Tung Lau
- Tung Ying Building
