= Robert Hung-Ngai Ho =

Chinese Canadian-American philanthropist and journalist (1932–2025)

- Born: 1932; British Hong Kong
- Died: 30 November 2025 (aged 93); Vancouver, British Columbia, Canada
- Education: B.A., 1956, Colgate University; M.A., 1958, Columbia University Graduate School of Journalism
- Occupations: Philanthropist, journalist
- Spouse: Greta
- Relatives: Robert Ho Tung (grandfather); Ho Fook (granduncle); Stanley Ho Hung-sun (second cousin)

Chinese name
- Traditional Chinese: 何鴻毅
- Simplified Chinese: 何鸿毅
Transcriptions
Standard Mandarin
- Hanyu Pinyin: Hé Hóngyì
Yue: Cantonese
- Jyutping: Ho4 Hung4 Ngai6

Robert Hung-Ngai Ho CM OBC (1932 – 30 November 2025) was a Chinese Canadian-American philanthropist and former journalist.

== Background ==
Ho was born in British Hong Kong in 1932 to one of the richest families in the then-British colony. Ho's grandfather, Robert Ho Tung, was a prominent businessman and philanthropist. Although born into a religiously Buddhist family, Ho did not become religious himself until adulthood.

He graduated from Colgate University in 1956 with a Bachelor of Arts degree and from the Columbia University Graduate School of Journalism in 1958 with a Master's degree in journalism. He then worked for The Pittsburgh Press, National Geographic, and Hong Kong's Kung Sheung Daily News, then owned by the Hotung family.

Ho died on 30 November 2025, at the age of 93.

== Philanthropy ==
Ho moved to Canada in 1989, settling in West Vancouver, British Columbia. There he established the Tung Lin Kok Yuen Canada Society in 1994, named in honour of his grandmother, Lady Clara Hotung (born Cheung Lin Kok); the Vancouver Tung Lin Kok Yuen temple was consecrated in 1995. He further founded the Tung Lin Kok Yuen Canada Foundation in 2005 to fund Buddhist studies.

In 2005, Ho launched the Robert H.N. Ho Family Foundation, which encourages younger children to learn about Chinese culture. The following year, he donated $4 million to the University of Toronto to fund Buddhist studies programs and another $4 million to the University of British Columbia (UBC) for the same purpose. In 2008, Stanford University renamed its Buddhist Studies Center in his honour after he donated $5 million.

In 2009, Ho donated $15 million towards the establishment of a research centre at Vancouver General Hospital for the Vancouver Prostate Centre, the Centre for Hip Health and Mobility, and the Ovarian Cancer Research Initiative. As a result of his philanthropy, Ho received an honorary degree from Hong Kong University in 2009, from UBC in 2012 and from Hong Kong Baptist University in 2015. He was also named Member of the Order of British Columbia in 2013 and Member of the Order of Canada in 2018 in recognition of his philanthropic work.

In 2019, Ho donated $15 million to his alma mater Colgate University to establish the Robert Hung Ngai Ho Mind, Brain, and Behavior Initiative. He and his wife Greta also donated $10 million to Lions Gate Hospital in North Vancouver to help build a mental health centre.
