= Commercial Radio Hong Kong =

Radio broadcasting company in Hong Kong

- Type: Private
- Industry: Radio broadcasting webcasting
- Founded: 1959
- Founder: George Ho
- Headquarters: Kowloon Tong, Hong Kong
- Key people: Stephen Chan Chi-wan (chief executive)
- Website: https://www.881903.com/

Commercial Radio Hong Kong
- Traditional Chinese: 香港商業電台
Transcriptions
Standard Mandarin
- Hanyu Pinyin: Xiānggǎng Shāngyè Diàntái
Yue: Cantonese
- Yale Romanization: Hēung góng sēung yihp dihn tòih
- Jyutping: Hoeng1gong2 Soeng1jip6 Din6toi4

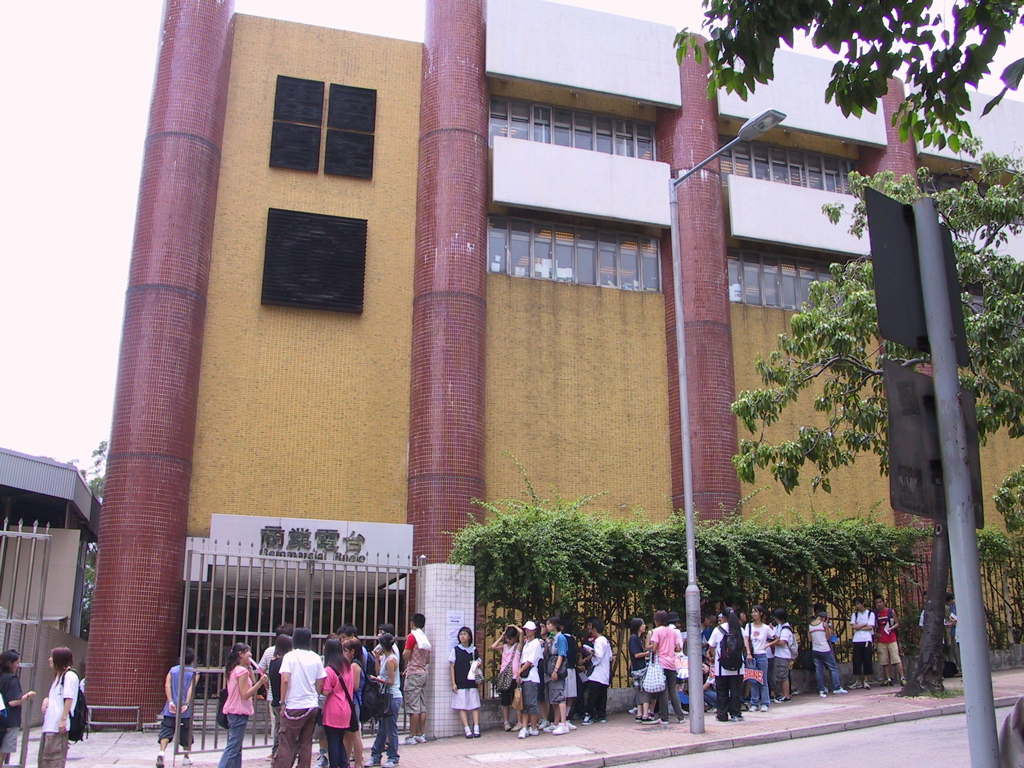
The Commercial Radio House on Broadcasting Drive

Commercial Radio Hong Kong (CRHK, Chinese: 香港商業電台), also known as Hong Kong Commercial Broadcasting Company Limited, is one of the two commercial radio broadcasting companies in Hong Kong, alongside Metro Radio Hong Kong. CRHK operates two Cantonese FM channels and one English AM channel, broadcasting news, music, and talk programming.

== History ==
CRHK was founded by George Ho Cho-chi on 26 August 1959, after he inherited HK$50,000 from his father, Sir Robert Ho Tung. The 10-year franchise of Radio Rediffusion ended its radio operations in 1959. CRHK then joined Radio Rediffusion and Radio Television Hong Kong.

Initially, Commercial Radio was located in Lai Chi Kok, near Mei Foo Sun Chuen. Nine years later, on 25 July 1966, the station relocated to Broadcast Drive. However, at that time, the new five-story building was still under refurbishment, so the station was temporarily housed in Yau Yat Chuen until 26 August 1971. G.J. Ho, the son of George Ho, is the current chairman of CRHK.

== Channels ==
Currently, CRHK broadcasts through two Cantonese channels on the FM band and an English channel on the AM band. All of the channels are 24-hour broadcasts, each with its own distinct program formats and audience.

=== FM 88.1 ===
CR1 FM 88.1 (雷霆881) is a talk-based channel that broadcasts current affairs, traffic and financial information, as well as audience talk shows.

=== FM 90.3 ===
CR2 FM 90.3 (叱咤903) is a music-based channel focused on pop music.

The programs feature the latest news in pop music, including Cantonese, Japanese, and English songs. This channel also organizes one of the four annual music awards in Hong Kong.

=== AM 864 ===
AM 864 (豁達864) is an English-language channel broadcasting hip-hop, R&B, jazz, rock and roll, and grunge, alongside international hits.

Listeners can stay updated with the latest news, especially on global issues, through AM 864. News is broadcast every hour throughout the day, along with weather forecasts and traffic reports. In addition, the channel regularly produces news reports and public affairs programs.

From 2000 to 2003, AM 864 partnered with HMV and was known as HMV 864. Among other names, "Quote 864" was also used as an on-air name.

In 2004, the station became automated and jockless, meaning it no longer had presenters (except for the hourly news). The format is adult hits, featuring popular music from the 1960s to the 2010s, catering to music lovers from every generation.

== Notable programmes ==
=== FM 88.1 ===
Among all the programs on 88.1, three actively discuss contemporary political, social, and economic issues in Hong Kong every day.

"On a Clear Day" airs on weekdays, from Monday to Friday, from 6:00 am to 10:00 am. This four-hour program is hosted by Stephen Chan, Chan Chung, and Ken Kwok. During the program, the hosts invite some members of the audience, as well as occasional guests, to join in the discussion of current issues. The program features a segment called "Voice Column," where some Commercial Radio DJs participate as columnists, sharing their own viewpoints on various topics. One example is the column "陶言無忌" by To Kit, who worked for the British Broadcasting Corporation for 8 years.

"Circles" airs Monday to Friday, from 3:00 pm to 5:00 pm. It focuses on interviews with celebrities and special guests.

"Summit" airs Monday to Friday, from 11:00 pm to 12:00 am. It is hosted by Chip Tsao, among others. The program is a talk show focusing on current affairs in Hong Kong, international relations, and culture-related topics.

=== FM 90.3 ===
Among all the programs on 90.3, two actively discuss contemporary political, social, and economic issues in Hong Kong every day.

"On a Clear Day" airs on weekdays, from Monday to Friday, from 8:00 am to 10:00 am. It is hosted by Jan Lamb, Ken Yuen, and Michelle Lo. The hosts invite some members of the audience, as well as occasional guests, to join in the discussion of current issues in a more comedic way. The program features a segment called "Voice Column," in which some Commercial Radio DJs participate as columnists, sharing their own viewpoints on various topics. One example is the column "陶言無忌" by To Kit, who worked for the British Broadcasting Corporation for eight years.

"Good Morning King" airs on weekdays, from Monday to Friday, from 10:00 am to 12:00 pm. It is hosted by Sammy Leung, Kitty Yuen, and Marco Hung. Marco Hung is no longer part of the program as of 3 March 2023.

=== AM 864 ===
Two foreign-language radio programs—"Hong Kong-Pak This Evening" in Urdu and "Nepal Darshan" in Nepali—were launched jointly by Commercial Radio and the Home Affairs Bureau on 18 June 2005 to promote multiculturalism in Hong Kong. The programs aimed to strengthen the sense of belonging among ethnic minorities in Hong Kong, while also helping them retain their cultural identities and differences.

The programs were broadcast for 26 consecutive Saturdays on Commercial Radio Channel 1 (AM864) until 10 December 2005. "Hong Kong-Pak This Evening" and "Nepal Darshan" aired from 8:00 pm to 8:30 pm and from 8:30 pm to 9:00 pm, respectively. The Urdu program was hosted by Abid Ali Baig, a poet and writer with 30 years of experience in the broadcasting industry in Pakistan, while the Nepali program was hosted by Pushpa Kumar Rai, who had worked for nearly 20 years in the former British Forces Broadcasting Service and is well known among the Nepalese community in Hong Kong. The programs featured music, news, sports, current affairs, and community services relevant to their respective ethnic groups. Local celebrities from these groups were also invited to discuss their cultures and their integration into the community.

Another program on AM864, Good Evening Kabayan, is for the Filipino community in Hong Kong. Its initial broadcast aired on 9 July 2001. It started as a two-hour show and, two years later, began airing twice a week on the channel.

In late 2017, the two programs were renamed to classify them into two different formats. Every Friday, from 9:00 pm to 11:00 pm, Pinoy Hit Music Central airs, and every Saturday, at the same time slot, Pilipinas Week in Review (PWIR) is broadcast. Hit Music Central plays the latest Original Pinoy Music (OPM), featuring interviews with celebrities from the Philippines and airing the most requested OPMs. PWIR provides Pinoy listeners in Hong Kong and around the world with the latest news and current affairs from both Hong Kong and the Philippines.

== Controversy and criticism ==
In mid-2004, three of the program hosts were well known for their outspoken hosting styles on social and political matters. Suddenly, all three announced they would stop. Albert Cheng Jing Han announced a hiatus from hosting his program in April 2004, citing pressure from the Chinese government, and later resigned by the end of July. Another political program host, Raymond Wong Yuk-man, announced his decision to quit his program on 13 May, claiming there was a threat to his family's safety. However, he decided to return to CRHK to host a brand new program for the station in October 2004. Allen Lee Peng-Fei replaced Cheng Jing Han, who announced his resignation on 19 May for political reasons. Freedom of speech has been a concern in Hong Kong since the 1997 Handover.

In May 2010, the memory of CR host Lam Bun was evoked after CR allowed the pro-Beijing Democratic Alliance for the Betterment of Hong Kong (DAB) to sponsor a political radio program. Activists protested outside the station, holding images of Lam, who was assassinated during the 1967 riots and became an icon of free speech. They complained that the station had desecrated his memory. The DAB stated that the programs focused on livelihood issues and denied that they promoted a political stance.

In late 2013, as a prelude to the renewal of its broadcasting license, CR replaced the outspoken critic of CY Leung, who had hosted an influential prime-time morning talk show. Lee Wai-ling, long despised by the pro-establishment camp for her vocal criticism of the government, was abruptly moved to a less prominent evening show and replaced by station chief executive Stephen Chan Chi-wan. Chan denied that political motivations were involved, but one former media executive stated that it was "an open secret" that some outspoken program hosts disliked by the government had to leave during the license renewal process, as media operators were under considerable political pressure.

== Commercial Radio Production ==
Commercial Radio Production Co. Ltd. (CRP) was established in 1997 to produce radio commercials. It has since expanded to offer market promotion services and an entertainment platform to the public.

=== Productions ===
CRP organizes various concerts and outdoor activities, such as the "Ultimate Song Chart Awards Presentation," "903 ID Club Music is Life Concert," and "Famine 30." It also hosts different types of gatherings for the audience of CRHK, such as the "903 ID Club." These activities provide a platform and more opportunities for both DJs and the audience to interact with each other. In addition, CRP has been releasing company products, including books and stationery, to promote its own brand.

=== Art room ===
While producing and organizing various activities, a large number of art products are needed, such as pamphlets, posters, and even the stage design for the "Ultimate Song Chart Awards Presentation." This fosters creativity and the production of aesthetic artwork.

=== The Basement ===
There has always been keen competition among Hong Kong radio stations. Recently, CRP launched video production services and introduced "903 Music on the Move." In this program, music and visuals are combined, creating a new definition for radio production. This combination was then extended to mobile phone services, creating a new medium for radio and music for users.

=== 881903.com ===
CRHK launched 881903.com in 1995 as the official website of Commercial Radio Hong Kong. CRP serves as the administrative organization for 881903.com. The station's signal is retransmitted over the internet, allowing anyone to listen online. Although only the Cantonese version is available, the website helps promote the station's programs and related products.

Internet users can find updated news, financial information, the program schedule, program synopses, and even personal pages of the DJs. By logging onto the site, people from around the world can listen to Radio 1 and 2. Members of 881903.com also have access to past radio programs. An open forum is available on the site, allowing the audience to leave comments on the programs or the DJs.

Due to its growing popularity, a multimedia marketing platform has been created, enabling CRP to target a larger audience, especially from overseas. Additional revenue is generated from advertisers such as Netvigator, ICQ and Motorola.

By having an online radio station, the audience can enjoy greater convenience and flexibility in listening to the radio. It also helps globalize their programs and, consequently, the radio station.

=== my903.com ===
In 2006, CRHK launched a dedicated website, MY903.com (formerly 90345678.com and 903456.com), for its CR2 channel. The website features an interactive and eye-catching layout that fosters a closer connection between program audiences and hosts, creating a promotional platform for special features in prime programs. In 2007, the beta version of MY903 FORUM was launched. This forum enables instant discussions on programs between hosts and audiences and provides an alternative platform for sharing opinions about the channel.

== 903 id Club ==
"903 id Club" is an organization established by Radio 2, CRHK, where "id" stands for "I Dream," "I Discover," "I Dare," and "I Decide." The 903 id Club aims to promote local music among teenagers. For example, it is one of the organizers of the "Life is Music Concert," which attracts thousands of audience members every year. The club also promotes new films and introduces the latest trends to the public. Additionally, 903 id Club provides a platform for music and film lovers to share their thoughts and interests.

Moreover, the 903 id Club is linked to several radio programs, such as "Sammy Moving," with some of the DJs from these programs working on projects supported by the club. One of the most successful examples is the annual drama performance by Sammy Leung Chi-Kin and Kitty Yuen Siu-Yee. Another success story is the boy group I Love You Boyz, formed by DJs Jim Yan and Donald. The group is known for their exaggerated and eerie comedic image. DJ Jan Lamb has also hosted a series of stand-up comedy shows produced by CR Productions.

Additionally, members of the 903 id Club can receive discounts at various shops, such as Laneige, and participate in activities organized by the club. This reinforces the audience's sense of belonging to the channel.

== Board of directors ==
- Honorary chairman: George Ho*
- Chairman: George Joseph Ho*
- Deputy chairman: Winnie Yu*
- Chief Executive Officer: Rita Chan
- Non-executive director: Kwok-kit Leung*
- Non-executive director: Richard Yat-sun Tang*
- Non-executive director: Michael Chi-hung Tse*
- Non-executive director: Chin-kung Kwok*
- Non-executive director: Amy Mei-yan Miao*
- *: Board of directors of the H.C.B.C. Enterprises Limited.

== See also ==
- Lam Bun
- Media of Hong Kong
- Metro Broadcast Corporation
- RTHK
