= Joseph Hotung =

Hong Kong businessman, art collector, and philanthropist (1930–2021)

- Born: Joseph Edward Hotung; 25 May 1930; Shanghai, China
- Died: 16 December 2021 (aged 91); London
- Education: University of London
- Occupation: Businessman
- Known for: Art collection, philanthrophy
- Spouses: Mary McGinley, Ann Carlo
- Parents: Edward Hotung (father); Alice Maud Newman (mother)
- Relatives: Robert Hotung (grandfather), Eric Hotung (brother)

Sir Joseph Edward Hotung (Chinese: 何鴻卿; pinyin: Ho Hung-hing; 25 May 1930 – 16 December 2021) was a British/Hong Kong businessman, art collector, and philanthropist.

== Biography ==
Hotung was born in 1930 in Shanghai to Edward Hotung, a founder of the Chinese Gold and Silver Exchange in Hong Kong, and his wife, Alice Maud Newman (aka "Mordia O'Shea"). He had an elder brother, Eric, who died in 2017, and two sisters, Mary and Antonia. His grandfather was tycoon Sir Robert Hotung (1862-1956), known as "the grand old man of Hong Kong", who, by the age of 35, had become the richest man in the territory.

Joseph Hotung was educated at St Francis Xavier College, Shanghai; St Louis College, Tianjin; the Catholic University of America; and the University of London, from which he received a LL.B.

Hotung began his career at Marine Midland Bank, New York, shortly after finishing his education, and returned to Hong Kong, after his father and grandfather died, to start his own business. He was involved in the family's Hong Kong real estate development and investment business, and served as a director of The Hongkong and Shanghai Banking Corporation, HSBC Holdings plc, and the Hongkong Electric Company.

Hotung was a supporter of many educational institutions. He funded the Hong Kong Academy for Gifted Education with the Government of Hong Kong, endowed a program for Law, Human Rights, and Peace Building in the Middle East at SOAS University of London, funded HIV/AIDS research at St George's, University of London and the construction of the Sir Joseph Hotung Centre in St George's Hospital Tooting that provides a facility for musculoskeletal treatment, research and education, endowed a post-doctoral fellowship at Columbia University's Weatherhead East Asian Institute, and founded the lecture theater at Mansfield College, Oxford. He also served as a council member of the University of Hong Kong and a member of the governing board of SOAS University of London.

== Art Collector ==
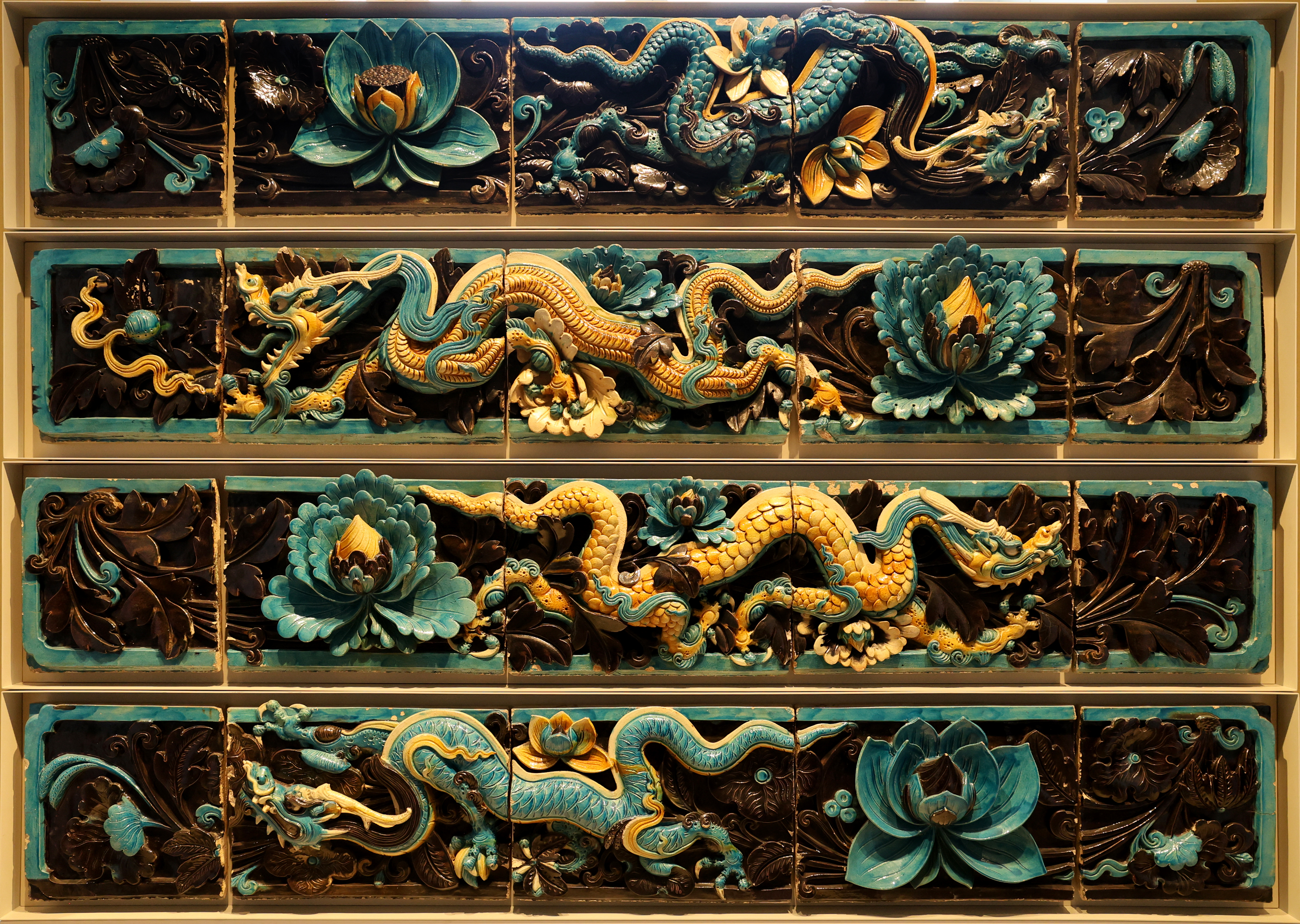
Ming Dynasty era glazed roof tiles from Shanxi province donated to the British Museum by Sir Joseph Hotung in 2006

Hotung was an avid collector of Chinese art, including Chinese jades, porcelain, bronzes, and furniture, as well as European paintings by the likes of Frans Hals, Manet and Turner, French silver and English furniture. He bequeathed his personal collection of 246 Chinese jades, 15 examples of early blue-and-white porcelain from the late Yuan and early Ming dynasties, and other antiquities from China worth an estimated £123m to the British Museum after his death in 2022.

A patron of the arts, he was the first chairman of the Hong Kong Arts Development Council and was a trustee of the Metropolitan Museum of Art, the Freer Gallery of Art, and the British Museum, where he served as a trustee from 1994 to 2004. He also paid for the renovation of the Sir Joseph Hotung Gallery for China and South Asia (twice), the Sir Joseph Hotung Centre for Ceramic Studies, which includes the Sir Percival David Collection of Chinese ceramics, and the Sir Joseph Hotung Great Court Gallery at the British Museum.

== Honours ==
He was knighted by Queen Elizabeth II in 1993. He received honorary degrees from St George's, University of London, University of Hong Kong, and the University of London.

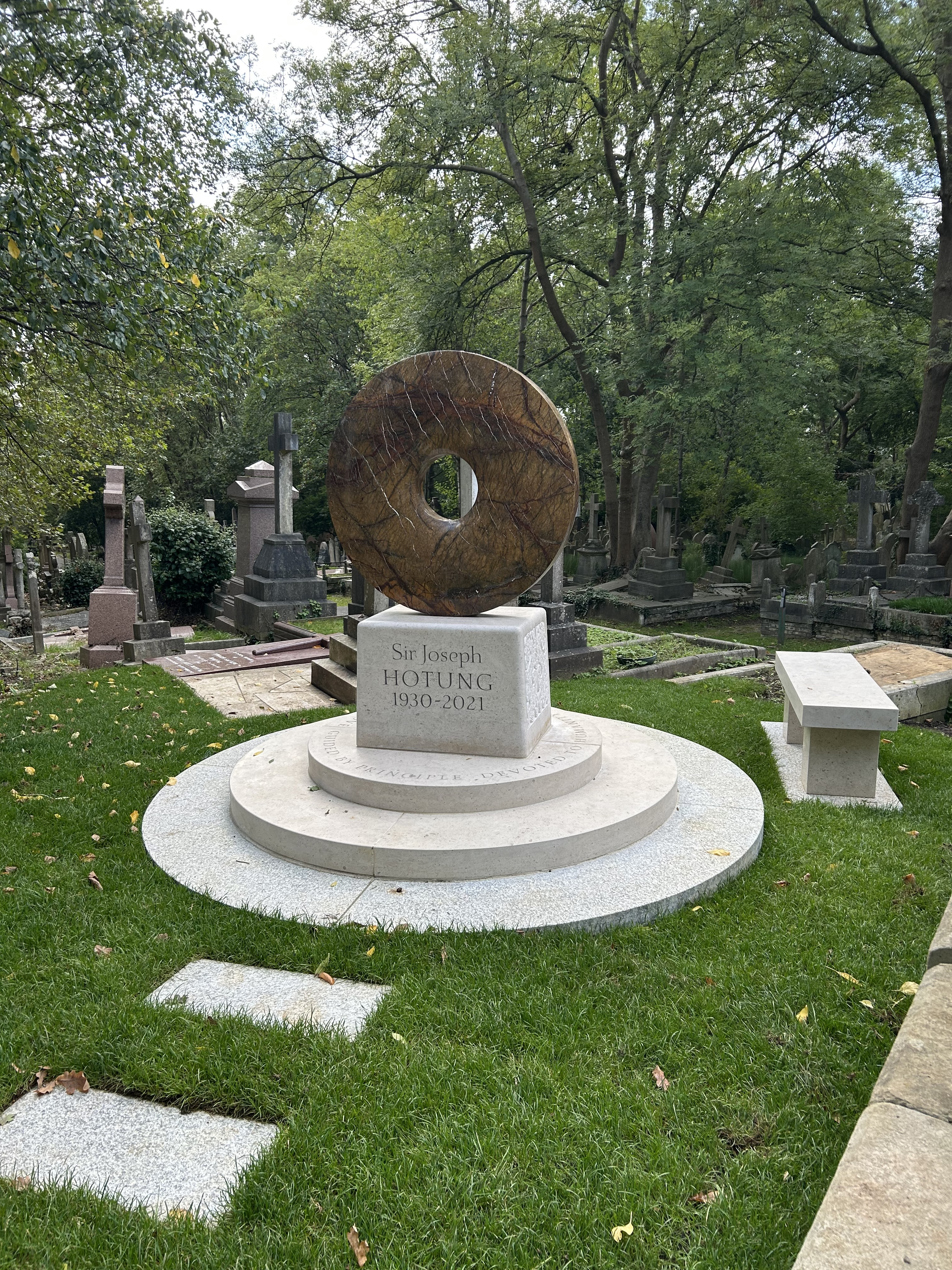
Memorial to Sir Joseph Hotung, designed and carved by Teucer Wilson in Highgate Cemetery

== Personal life ==
Hotung died in London on 16 December 2021, aged 91. He had 4 children from a previous marriage to Mary McGinley Hotung.
