= Akers-Jones =

Akers-Jones is a surname. Notable people with the surname include:

- David Akers-Jones (1927–2019), British colonial administrator in Hong Kong, husband of Jane
- Jane Akers-Jones (1928–2002), British Girl Guide leader in Hong Kong, wife of David
