= Marina District Development =

Business in New Jersey, United States (2003–2016)

Marina District Development Company, LLC
- Company type: LLC Partnership
- Industry: Gambling, Hotels, Entertainment
- Founded: 2003; 23 years ago
- Defunct: August 1, 2016
- Fate: Purchased outright by MGM Resorts International
- Successor: Borgata Hotel Casino & Spa, LLC.
- Headquarters: 1 Borgata Way, Atlantic City, New Jersey, United States
- Products: Casinos, Hotels
- Owner: Boyd Gaming; MGM Resorts International

The Marina District Development Company, LLC was a joint venture of Boyd Gaming Corporation and MGM Resorts International that was established to develop and operate the Borgata Hotel Casino and Spa in Atlantic City, New Jersey.

== History ==
After a competitive process, MGM Mirage was selected as the lead developer of government-owned vacant property in the "H-Tract" area, later renamed Renaissance Pointe. MGM Mirage sought the participation of Boyd Gaming, which became the operating partner of the Borgata.

Three casino-hotels were planned for Renaissance Pointe but only the Borgata has been built.

In early 2010, following the conclusion of an investigation by the New Jersey Casino Control Commission and the Division of Gaming Enforcement into the company's suitability as a casino licensee, executives at MGM announced that they would place their shares in MDDC into a special trust until they find a suitable buyer. In their investigation, the NJCCC and DGE alleged that Macau businesswoman Pansy Ho and her father Stanley have deep ties to criminal elements in Macau and mainland China, and therefore would not be suitable for licensing in New Jersey. The NJCCC gave MGM a choice of ending their relationship with Ho by selling their interest in the MGM Grand Macau, or facing revocation of their New Jersey casino license. On October 14, the New Jersey Casino Control Commission approved the $73 million sale of land underneath the Borgata to Vornado Realty Trust and Geyser Holdings as part of its exit strategy from Atlantic City. On September 10, 2014, the New Jersey Casino Control Commission approved MGM Resorts International's licensure to resume its 50 percent ownership stake in the partnership.

On August 1, 2016, MGM Resorts International completed the purchase of Boyd Gaming's 50 percent in Marina District Development and The Borgata for $900 million. On that day MDDC ceased to exist and a new company Borgata Hotel Casino & Spa, LLC. was formed as a wholly owned subsidiary of MGM Resorts International.
