= Sea Scout =

Member of the Sea Scouts

Sea Scouting
- Country: Worldwide
- Founded: 1909

Sea Scouts are a part of the Scout movement, with a particular emphasis on boating and other water-based activities on the sea, rivers or lakes (canoeing, rafting, scuba diving, sailboarding). Sea Scouts can provide a chance to sail, cruise on boats, learn navigation, learn how to work on engines and compete in regattas. Sea Scouts often have distinctive uniforms. In some countries or Scout organisations, Sea Scouting is a programme just for older Scouts. Sea scouts is also the 2nd oldest Scout branch.

== History ==
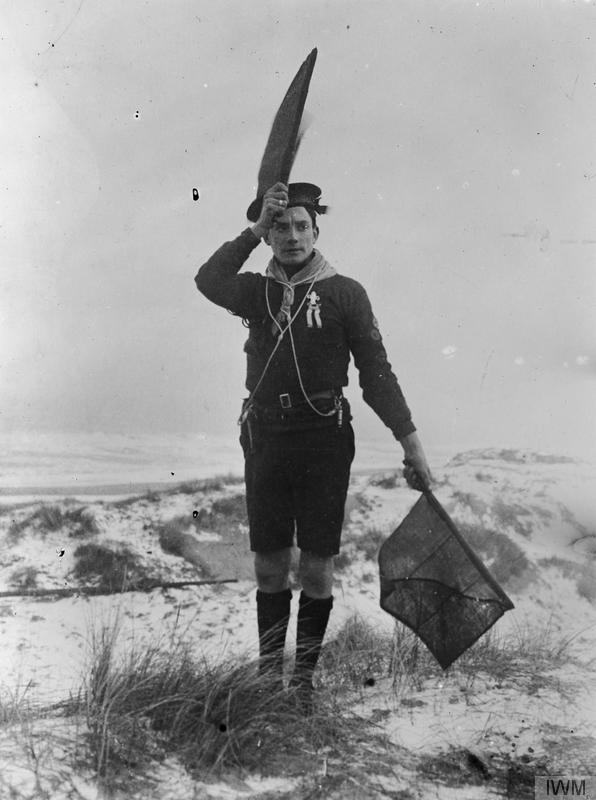
A coast-watching Sea Scout signals to a British warship during the First World War.

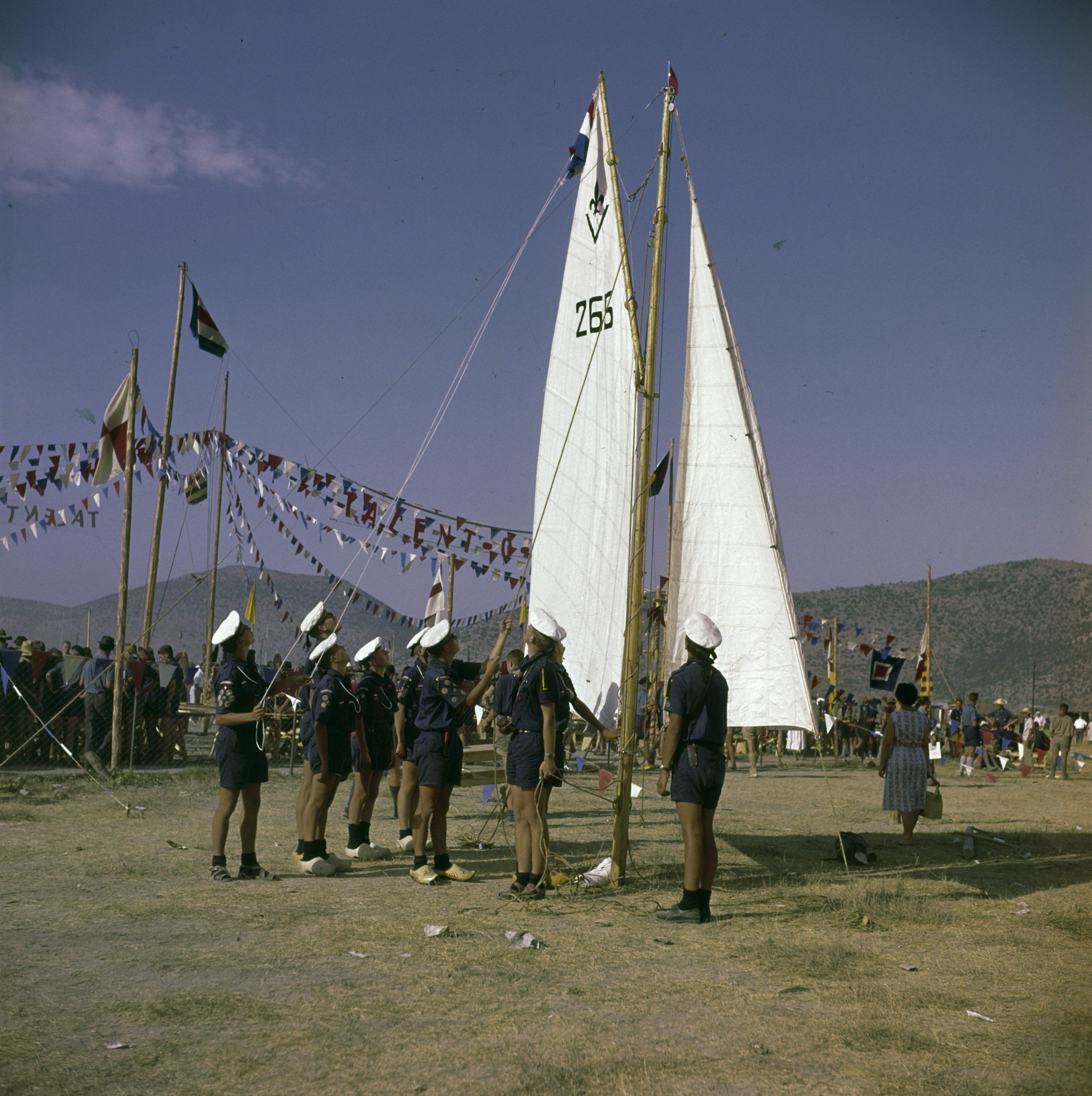
A demonstration by Netherlands Sea Scouts at the 11th World Scout Jamboree in Greece, 1963.

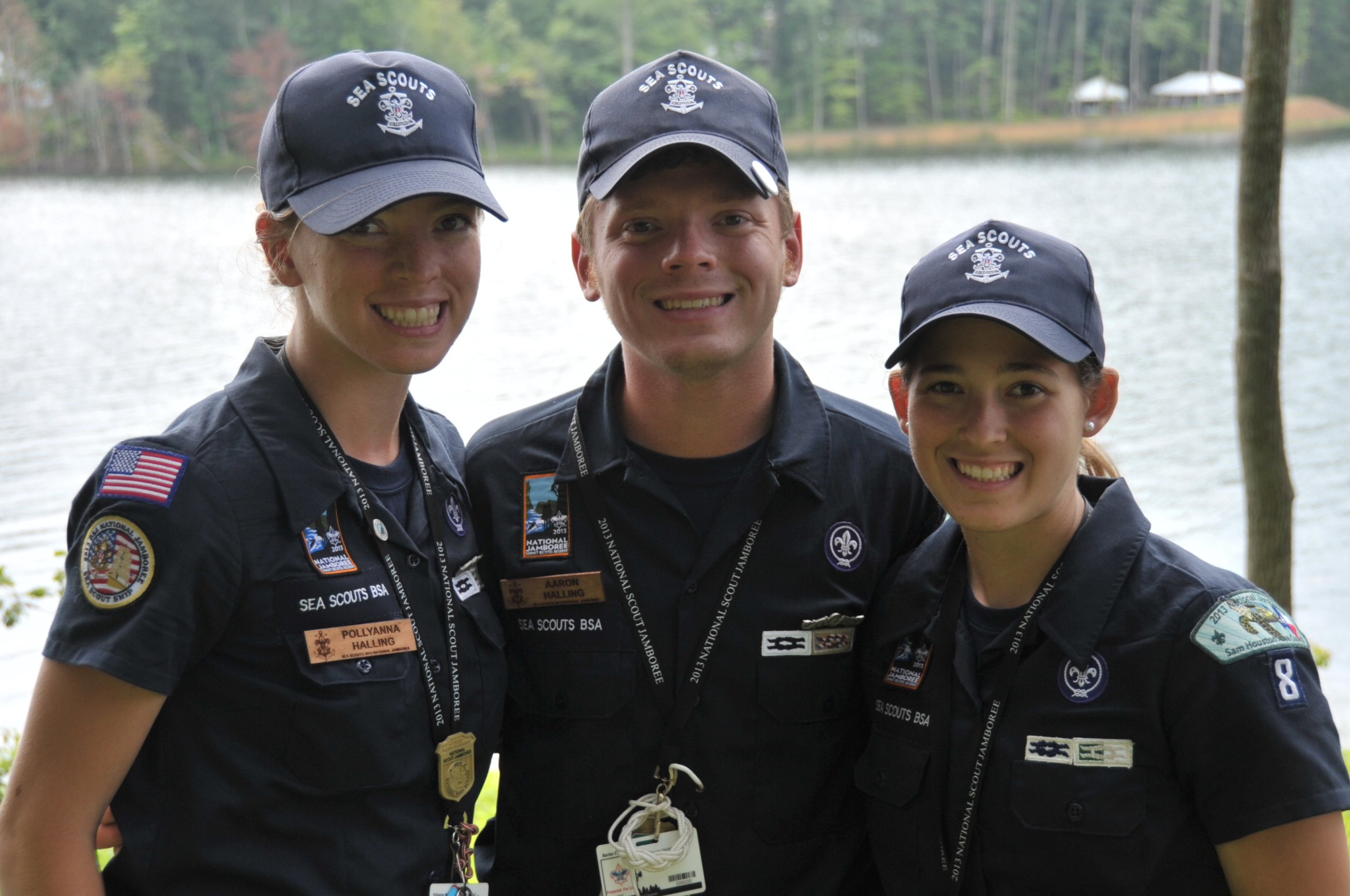
US Sea Scout leaders in 2013

One of the earliest records of "Sea Scouts" is in Chums magazine which refers to "Sea Scouts" as early as July 1909. These Sea Scouts were part of the Chums Scouts and British Boy Scouts.

Also in the Chums magazine, the British Boys Naval Brigade, later National Naval Cadets, were subtitled 'Scouts of the Sea' from the 14 July 1909 edition and, from the 28 July 1909 edition, 'Sea Scouts of the Empire'. The British Boy Scouts and an original company of The National Naval Cadets were both headquartered in Battersea, London, and the 'boys' newspaper Chums was the official journal of both.The National Naval Cadets affiliated with the British Boy Scouts as part of its Sea Scouts.

Later, Sea Scouts were introduced within the Baden-Powell Boy Scouts organization. In the first edition of Scouting for Boys, Robert Baden-Powell mentioned that "a Scout should be able to manage a boat, to bring it properly alongside a ship or pier....". In December 1908, the first Seamanship badge was issued as one of the first 'Efficiency' badges. A camp for Scouts was held at Bucklers Hard, Hampshire in August 1909 at which boating activities were a focus. In 1911, Baden-Powell wrote the booklet Sea Scouting for Boys. Warington Baden-Powell wrote Sea Scouting and Seamanship for Boys in 1912, with a foreword by Robert Baden-Powell. A special uniform for Sea Scouts was approved in 1910 and, in 1912, the name "Sea Scouts" was officially adopted within Baden-Powell's Boy Scouts Association.

Sea Scouting found its way to the rest of the world. In many organisations a Sea Scout troop or group has a special name, in the Boy Scouts of America it is called a ship, and they are sometimes referred to as "Puddle pirates".

== Around the world ==
| Country | Membership | Troops/Groups | Age group | See also |
|---|---|---|---|---|
| Argentina | | 2 | 6-21 | http://gruposcoutnavalesalteg-brown.webnode.es/ |
| Australia | | 92 | 6–26 | |
| Austria | | 4 | 10–20 | Pfadfinder und Pfadfinderinnen Österreichs |
| Bahamas | | | | |
| Bangladesh | 3,500 | 30 | 14–25 | |
| Barbados | | | | |
| Belgium | 3,100 | 27 | 6–18 | |
| Brazil | 5,315 | 102 | 6.5–21 | |
| Bulgaria | | at least 1 | | |
| Canada | | 25 | 11–26 | |
| Croatia | | 7 | | |
| Cyprus | | 9 | | |
| Czech Republic | 4,016 | 166 | above 5 | Czech Sea Scouts Headquarters |
| Denmark | 3,800 | | | |
| Egypt | | | | |
| Finland | 9,000 | 100 | Above 7 | |
| France | 2,500 | | | |
| Germany | | 12 | | |
| Gibraltar | | 1 | | |
| Greece | 4,000 | | above 7 | Soma Hellinon Proskopon (Boy Scouts) |
| Greece | 4,000 | | | Soma Hellinikou Odigismou (co-ed Guides) |
| Hong Kong | | | 11–20 | |
| Hungary | | 6 | above 12 | https://vizicserkesz.hu |
| Iceland | | 1 | | |
| India | 50000 | 115 | 12–26 | https://www.seascoutsindia.org |
| Indonesia | | 4 | 14-20 | Satuan Karya (Saka) Bahari |
| Ireland | 3,944 | 29 | 6–26 | Sea Scouts (Scouting Ireland) |
| Israel | 1,000 | 8 | 10–18 | Israel Sea Scouts Website |
| Italy | 500 | 30 | | |
| Latvia | 50 | 1 | 7–18 | |
| Lithuania | 300 | 13 | 8–29 | Lithuanian Scouting Sea Scouts |
| Malaysia | | at least 20 | 12–19 | |
| Monaco | | 1 | | |
| Montenegro | | | | |
| Netherlands | 2,167 | 300 | 7–11 | Scouting Nederland |
| Netherlands | 5,401 | 300 | 10–15 | Scouting Nederland |
| Netherlands | 1,395 | 300 | 14–17 | Scouting Nederland |
| Netherlands | 2,000 | 300 | 17–23 | Scouting Nederland |
| New Zealand | 2,000 | 60 | 10–15.5 | Sea Scouts New Zealand |
| Norway | 2,000 | 26 | 6-25 | |
| Pakistan | 200 | | | |
| Poland (01-01-2007) | 295 (159g+136b) | 175 | 6–9 | |
| Poland (01-01-2007) | 669 (366g+303b) | 175 | 10–12 | |
| Poland (01-01-2007) | 910 (442g+351b) | 175 | 13–15 | |
| Poland (01-01-2007) | 735 (392f+343m) | 175 | 16–18 | |
| Poland (01-01-2007) | 225 (89f+163m) | 175 | 19–25 | |
| Poland (01-01-2007) | ~475 | 175 | leaders | |
| Philippines | | | 10–17 | |
| Pitcairn Island | | 1 | | |
| Portugal | 1500 | 18 | 6–22 | https://maritimos.escutismo.pt/ |
| Romania | 100 | 2 | | |
| Serbia | | | | |
| Singapore | | | 12–24 | Singapore Sea Scouts |
| Slovakia | | 6 | | Vodný skauti |
| South Africa | | 20 | 11–18 | |
| Spain | | 2 | | |
| Sweden | 7,000 | 80 | 8-25 | |
| Switzerland | 130 | 1 | >6 | Pfadibewegung Schweiz |
| Thailand | | | | |
| Trinidad and Tobago | 1,893 | 18 | 11–21 | |
| Turkey | | | | |
| United Kingdom | 10,000 | 401 | 10–14 | Sea Scouts (The Scout Association) |
| United Kingdom | | | 14–18 | Sea Scouts (The Scout Association) |
| United States | 15,000 | | 13–21 | Sea Scouts (Boy Scouts of America); Girl Scouts of the USA |

== Eurosea seminars ==
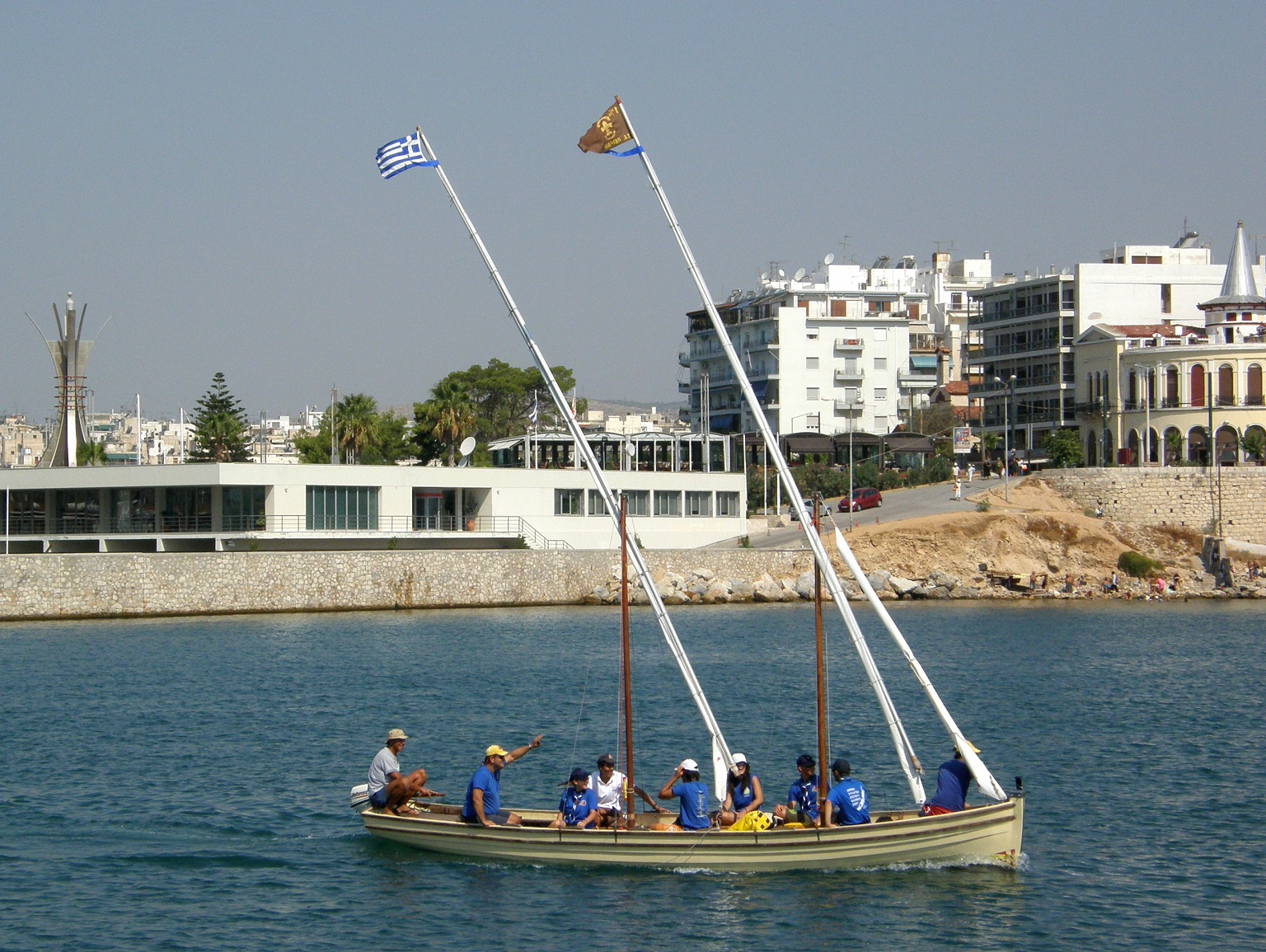
A sailboat of Sea Scouts of Greece sailing from Zea marina

Eurosea is the seminar for Sea Scouting/Guiding in the European Scout Region which take place every two or three years. The aims and objectives are to enable national associations to share ideas and experiences on how to develop Sea Scouting/Guiding or water-based programmes in general. Participants are members of national or regional teams responsible for Sea Scouting/Guiding or developing water-based programmes and representatives from associations interested in introducing Sea Scouting/Guiding.

- Eurosea 1, 1985: Thessaloniki, Greece
- Eurosea 2, 1988: Harderhaven, Netherlands
- Eurosea 3, 1992: Vässarö, Sweden
- Eurosea 4, 1994: London, United Kingdom
- Eurosea 5, 1997: Oslo, Norway
- Eurosea 6, 2000: Olsztynek, Poland
- Eurosea 7, 2003: São Jacinto, Aveiro, Portugal
- Eurosea 8, 2006: Korpo, Finland
- Eurosea 9, 2008: Larch Hill, Ireland
- Eurosea 10, 2010: Plzeň, Czech Republic
- Eurosea 11, 2012: Copenhagen, Denmark
- Eurosea 12, 2014: Bruges, Belgium
- Eurosea 13, 2016: Puck, Poland
- Eurosea 14, 2018: Barcelona, Spain
- Eurosea 15, 2022: Athens, Greece
- Eurosea 16, 2024: Znojmo, Czech Republic

== Loss of vessels ==
- 4 August 1912 – eight Boy Scouts from the 2nd Walworth (Dulwich Mission) group and another boy drowned in capsize of a cutter off Leysdown-on-Sea, Kent, England. The boat was carrying twenty-three Scouts from Erith to a camp at Leysdown.
- 27 October 1913 – three Scouts and an assistant leader drowned and eleven Scouts were saved when the ketch Mirror was hit by the steamer Hogarth (1231 tons) while tacking across the river. Mirror had been a gift of the Daily Mirror newspaper to the Scouts.
- In August 1950 – all ten Scouts on board were killed when the Wangle III, owned by 1st Mortlake Sea Scouts was lost on a return voyage from France.

== See also ==
- S.S.S. Lotus
