= Ina Chan Un Chan =

Hong Kong businesswoman and philanthropist

Ina Chan
- 陳婉珍
- Born: 1 March 1953 (age 73); Portuguese Macau
- Occupation: Businesswoman
- Known for: Permanent Director of Hong Kong Art Craft Merchants Association Limited
- Spouse: Stanley Ho (m. 1977; died 2020)
- Children: Florinda Ho (born 1989); Laurinda Ho (born 1991); Orlando Ho (born 1991)

Ina Chan (born 1 March 1953), also known as Ina Chan Un Chan, is a businesswoman and philanthropist in Hong Kong. She is the Chairman of UNIR (HK) Management Limited which manages a diverse investment portfolio consisting mainly of hospitality, realty, leisure, retail and transportation businesses. Her property amounts to $1 billion, according to Forbes.

Chan is actively engaged in a wide range of community and charitable causes, as well as a supporter of the development of arts and cultural endeavors. She was the Chairman of Tung Wah Group of Hospitals (2013/14) and is a member of numerous other charitable organizations. She is also a member of the 10th Guangdong Provincial Committee of Chinese People's Political Consultative Conference.

Chan is commonly known as the third wife of Dr. Stanley Ho, a Hong Kong and Macau entrepreneur. They have three children.

== Personal life ==
Born in Macau, Chan is a native of Xinhui, Guangdong, mainland China. She received her secondary education at the Sacred Heart Canossian College, Macau. Later on, she received an Honorary Doctorate in Commerce from The University of West Alabama and an Honorary Doctorate in Management from Lincoln University, USA; as well as an Honorary Fellowship Award from Canadian Chartered Institute of Business Administration.

Chan became engaged with Dr. Stanley Ho after working as a caretaker and nurse for his first wife. They have three children together. Florinda, the elder daughter was born on 27 February 1989, Laurinda and Orlando, the twins, were born on 9 May 1991.

== Career ==
As an ardent fan of antiques, Chan opened the Treasure Court antique store in the 1980s, and began investing in other businesses. In 2004, she founded On Power Management Limited, through which she conducts the investment and management of her realty businesses.

In 2011, she set up UNIR (HK) Management Limited to consolidate and oversee her diverse range of investments, focusing on five core businesses, namely, hospitality, realty, leisure, retail and transportation. Over the years, her business has been expanding from Hong Kong into other territories such as mainland China, the Asian Pacific region and the United States. She is also a shareholder in a broad range of companies including Sociedade de Turismo e Diversões de Macau (STDM), the ultimate holding company of SJM Holdings Limited (HKEx:880).

== Current major positions (as of 2012) ==
=== Community ===
- Permanent Director of Hong Kong Art Craft Merchants Association Limited (founded in 1968)
- Director of Beijing Xiaoxing Ballet Art Development Foundation
- Member of Guangdong Provincial Committee of Chinese People's Political Consultative Conference
- Life Patron of Hong Kong Ballet Group
- Vice-chairman of Beijing China Overseas Friendship Association

=== Business ===
- Chairman of UNIR (HK) Management Limited
- Director of Sociedade de Turismo e Diversões de Macau, SA (STDM)
- Director of Treasure Court
- Director of Sky Shuttle Helicopters Limited

=== Philanthropy ===
- Chairman of Tung Wah Group of Hospitals (2013–14) (Director since 2006/08)
- Honorary Vice-president of Hong Kong Anti-Cancer Society
- Member of Fundraising Committee of End Child Sexual Abuse Foundation (2003)
- Sponsor of Mobile Classroom of End Child Sexual Abuse Foundation
- Vice-Presidente of the Assembleia Geral da Obra das Mães, Macau
- Honorary Director For Life of Guangdong Women and Children's Foundation

== Honours ==
- World Outstanding Chinese Award 2008 (The United World Chinese Association)
- China Children Philanthropists 2008 (The China Children and Teenagers' Fund)
- Star of Charity (The Guangdong Women and Children's Foundation)
