= Daisy Ho =

Hong Kong businesswoman (born 1964)

- Born: 何超鳳; Ho Chiu-fung; 1964 (age 61–62)
- Education: University of Southern California (BA); University of Toronto (MBA)
- Occupation: Casino businesswoman
- Parent(s): Stanley Ho; Lucina Laam
- Relatives: Pansy Ho (sister); Maisy Ho (sister); Josie Ho (sister); Lawrence Ho (brother)

Chinese name
- Traditional Chinese: 何超鳳
- Simplified Chinese: 何超凤
Transcriptions
Standard Mandarin
- Hanyu Pinyin: Hé Chāofèng
Yue: Cantonese
- Yale Romanization: Hòh Chīu-fuhng

Daisy Ho Chiu-fung (Chinese: 何超鳳; born 1964) is a Hong Kong businesswoman who is the daughter of Macau-based businessman Stanley Ho. She is the chairman and executive director of SJM Holdings, a major owner, operator and developer of casinos in Macau. She is also an executive director of Shun Tak Holdings.

== Biography ==
Ho was born in 1964. She is the second daughter of Stanley Ho and his second wife. Her siblings are Pansy Ho, Josie Ho, Maisy Ho, and Lawrence Ho.

Ho earned an MBA in finance from the University of Toronto and BA in marketing from the University of Southern California. She worked for several investment banks before joining Shun Tak Holdings in 1994 as executive director and was appointed chief financial officer in 1999.

In 2013, Ho became chairwoman of Hong Kong Ballet and performed from Swan Lake at the Hong Kong Tatler Ball. She also chairs the University of Toronto (Hong Kong) Foundation, a scholarship fund that sends academically gifted Hong Kong students on a scholarship to U of T, and serves on the dean's advisory board of the Rotman School of Management.

In 2018, Ho became chairman of the board of director and executive director of SJM Holdings, succeeding her father, Stanley Ho. She is also the executive director and Deputy Managing Director of Shun Tak Holdings.

Ho has served as a director and chairman of Hong Kong charity Po Leung Kuk, Vice President of the Real Estate Developers Association of Hong Kong, and a member of the Chinese General Chamber of Commerce. She became the chairwoman of the Hong Kong Ballet again in 2020 and was also the Chief Commissioner of the Hong Kong Girl Guides Association. In October 2026, Fortune Names Ho in a list of Most Powerful Women Asia.

== Personal life ==
Ho has two children, Beatrice Ho and Gillian Ho, graduates of Princeton University and Columbia University, respectively.
