= Josie Ho =

Hong Kong singer and actress

- 何超儀
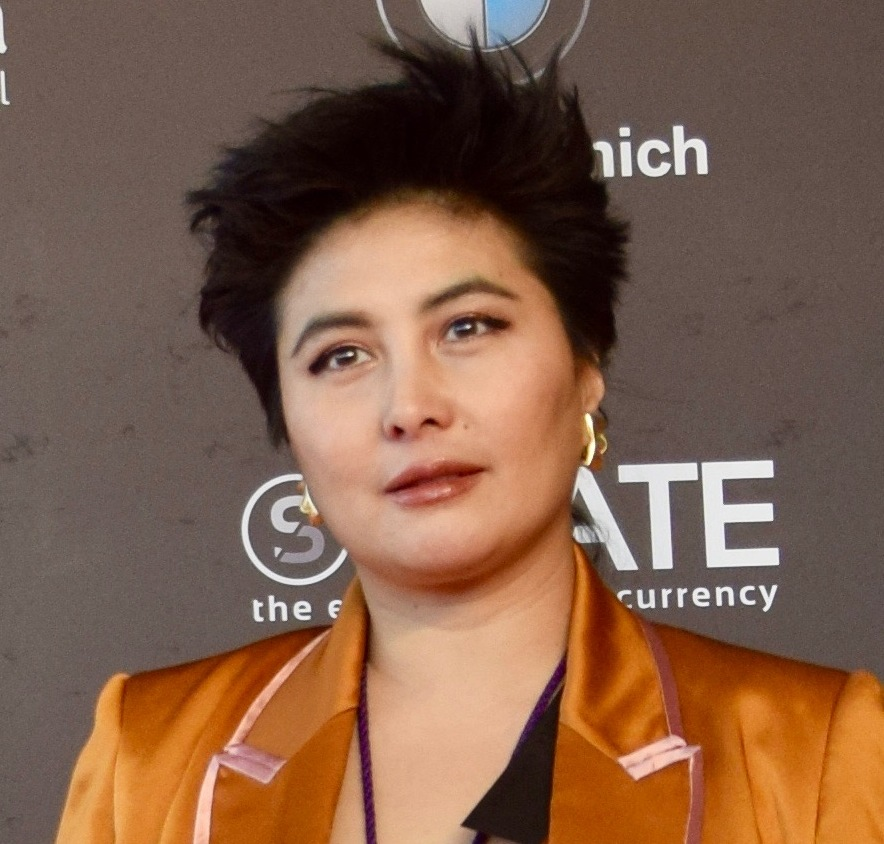
- Ho in 2018
- Born: Josephine Ho Chiu-yi; 26 December 1974 (age 51); British Hong Kong
- Occupations: Actress; singer
- Years active: 1994–present
- Spouse: Conroy Chan (m. 2003)
- Parents: Stanley Ho (father); Lucina Lam (mother)
- Awards: Hong Kong Film Awards – Best Supporting Actress; 2004 Naked Ambition Golden Bauhinia Awards – Best Supporting Actress; 2001 Forever and Ever TVB Anniversary Awards – Best Supporting Actress; 2014 Tomorrow Is Another Day

Chinese name
- Traditional Chinese: 何超儀
- Simplified Chinese: 何超仪
Transcriptions
Standard Mandarin
- Hanyu Pinyin: Hé Chāoyí

Josephine Ho Chiu-yi (Chinese: 何超儀; born 26 December 1974) is a Hong Kong actress and singer. She is the daughter of Macao casino magnate Stanley Ho.

== Early life and family ==
Ho is the youngest daughter of businessman Stanley Ho and his second wife Lucina Lam. She has three older sisters, Pansy, Daisy, Maisy and a younger brother, Lawrence, as well as several half-brothers and half-sisters.

== Career ==
She has played many roles, including portraying the parts of prostitutes, which were in strong contrast to her own wealthy upbringing as a billionaire's daughter. For the film Exiled, Ho did not work with a script. Recalling the experience in a recent interview, she said of director Johnnie To, "[He] basically tells actors what to do ... Johnnie wants us to come to the set with our mind completely clean, like a white piece of paper. That way, he can draw whatever he wishes on us." Ho starred alongside Eason Chan in the Pang Ho-cheung directed slasher film, Dream Home.

In 2009, Ho along with husband Conroy Chan, and Andrew Ooi, co-founded 852 Films, a film production company.

== Personal life ==
In November 2003, Ho married musician-actor Conroy Chan Chi-chung in Australia.

She credits her oldest sister Pansy with supporting her early efforts to establish a singing career over the objections of their father.

== Filmography ==
=== Film ===
Film
Year	Title	Role	Notes
1994	Victory	Disappearance	
1995	Tragic Commitment	Blacky	
1995	Black Dream	Naked shopkeeper	
1996	Those Were the Days	Man-Sze	
1996	Lost and Found	Yee	
1997	All's Well, Ends Well 1997	Kung's secretly loved girlfriend	
1997	Chinese Box	Lilly	
1998	The End of Love Generation		
1998	You Light Up My Life	Joyce	
1998	Anna Magdalena	Michelle	
1999	Slow Fade	Kim	
1999	Purple Storm	Guan Ai	
2000	Sexy and Dangerous II	Nozzle	
2000	For Bad Boys Only	Jean	
2001	Forever and Ever	Fion	
2001	The Enemy	Wendy	
2001	The Legend of a Professional	Jenny	
2001	City of Desire	Pepper	
2001	Horror Hotline... Big Head Monster	Mavis Ho	
2002	Color of Pain	Ching Yin	
2002	Dead or Alive: Final	Jun	
2002	Women from Mars	Tom's ex-girlfriend	
2002	Tai Tai	Clara	Short film
2002	Frugal Game	Mrs. Lai	
2002	So Close	Ching	
2003	My Lucky Star	Mrs. Ma	
2003	And Also the Eclipse		
2003	The Twins Effect	Lila	
2003	1:99 Shorts		Segment: "8"
2003	Naked Ambition	Tess	
2004	Six Strong Guys	Eva	
2004	Butterfly	Flavia	
2005	House of Fury	GJ	
2006	McDull, the Alumni	Office girl	
2006	Isabella	Woman at herbal tea shop	
2006	The Heavenly Kings	Herself	Cameo
2006	Men Suddenly in Black 2	Mrs. Turtle	
2006	Exiled	Jin (Wo's wife)	
2007	Simply Actors	Working girl	
2007	The Drummer	Sina	
2008	A Decade of Love		Segment: "Open Rice"
2009	Street Fighter: The Legend of Chun-Li	Cantana	
2009	LaMB	Keiko Suzuki	Voice for English and Cantonese
2009	Cut Short	Josie	Short film
2009	Murderer	Minnie	
2009	Poker King	Ms. Fong	
2010	Dream Home	Cheng Lai-sheung	Also producer
2011	Contagion	Li Fai's sister	
2012	Floating City		
2012	The Courier	Anna	
2012	Motorway	Wei	
2013	Badges of Fury	Head Chief	Cameo
2013	Open Grave	Brown Eyes	
2014	The Apostles		
2014	Naked Ambition 2	Shodaiko Hatoyama	
2014	The Seventh Lie	Femme Fatale	
2015	Full Strike	Ng Kau-sau	
2015	In the Room	Orchid	Completed
2016	House of Wolves		
2019	Lucky Day	Mrs. Kok	
2021	Edge of the World	Madame Lim	Also producer
2021	Habit		Post-production, producer
2021	Two Komachis		Guest role
2022	ONPAKU	Sarah	
TBA	Mother Tongue	Josie & Mustang	Filming

=== Television ===
Television
Year	Title	Role	Notes
1996	The Criminal Investigator		
1997	Mystery Files		
1997	Dongfang Muqin	Shi Xiaofang (Chaoyi He)	22 episodes 1997
1997	A Road and a Will	Yue Wing-kam	
1999	At the Threshold of an Era		
2000	At the Threshold of an Era II		
2010	The Fugitive: Plan B	Hwai	
2014	Tomorrow Is Another Day	Ting Ho-ho	TVB Anniversary Award for Best Supporting Actress

== Awards and nominations ==
Hong Kong Film Awards
Year	Nominated work	Award	Category	Result
2011	Dream Home	The 30th Hong Kong Film Awards	Best Actress	Nominated
2004	Naked Ambition	The 23rd Hong Kong Film Awards	Best Supporting Actress	Won
2004	Twin Effects	The 23rd Hong Kong Film Awards	Best Supporting Actress	Nominated
2002	Forever and Ever	The 21st Hong Kong Film Awards	Best Supporting Actress	Nominated
2000	Purple Storm	The 19th Hong Kong Film Awards	Best Supporting Actress	Nominated

Hong Kong Film Critics Golden Bauhinia Awards
Year	Nominated work	Category	Result
2005	Butterfly/ Hu Dei	Best Actress	Nominated
2004	Naked Ambition	Best Supporting Actress	Nominated
2002	Forever and Ever	Best Supporting Actress	Won
2000	Purple Storm	Best Supporting Actress	Nominated

Sitges Film Festival
Year	Nominated work	Award	Category	Result
2018		The 51st Sitges Film Festival	The Time Machine Award	Won
2010	Dream Home	The 43rd The Sitges Film Festival	Best Actress	Won

Miscellaneous awards
Year	Nominated work	Award	Category	Result
2019		The 5th World Grandmaster Award	World Most Outstanding Grandmaster Excellence Award	Won
2017	In The Room	The 1st Profima International Film Fest & Award	Supreme Best Supporting Actress	Won
2015		The Hong Kong Society of Cinematographers	The Best Charm Actress	Won
2014	Tomorrow is another day	The TVB Anniversary Awards	Best Supporting Actress	Won
2000	Purple Storm	Taiwan Golden Horse Award	Best Supporting Actress	Nominated
