= Operation Smile China Medical Mission =

Operation Smile - China Medical Mission Limited
- 微笑行動中國基金有限公司
- Formation: 1991
- Type: NGO
- Legal status: Medical charity
- Headquarters: Hong Kong
- Services: Provision of free corrective surgery for the underprivileged children and young adults with clefts in China
- Chairman: Sir David Akers-Jones
- Website: oscmm.org

Operation Smile China Medical Mission (OSCMM) is a non-profit organisation that provides reconstructive surgery for the underprivileged children with cleft lips and / or palates in China.

Chaired by Sir David Akers-Jones, OSCMM has provided over 26,000 free cleft surgeries to date since founded in 1991 in Hong Kong. To enhance long-term capabilities of local medical professionals in China to treat cleft lip and palate, OSCMM also provides intensive resident and surgical training programmes.

The organisation receives support from worldwide volunteers and donors.
