= Naked Ambition (2003 film) =

2003 Hong Kong film by Chan Hing-ka and Dante Lam

- Film poster
- Traditional Chinese: 豪情
- Simplified Chinese: 豪情
- Hanyu Pinyin: Háo Qíng
- Jyutping: Hou4 Cing4
- Directed by: Dante Lam; Chan Hing-ka
- Written by: Chan Hing-ka
- Produced by: Chan Hing-ka; Louis Koo; Amy Chin
- Starring: Louis Koo; Eason Chan; Cherrie Ying; Niki Chow; Josie Ho; Denise Ho; Jo Kuk
- Cinematography: O Sing-pui; Wong Wing-hung
- Edited by: Cheung Ka-fai; Chan Ki-hop
- Music by: Tommy Wai
- Production companies: China Star Entertainment Group; One Hundred Years of Film; Icon Films; Panorama Entertainment; Go Film Distribution
- Release date: 30 October 2003
- Running time: 131 minutes
- Country: Hong Kong
- Language: Cantonese
- Box office: HK$8,279,733

Naked Ambition (Chinese: 豪情, literally "Wanton Emotions") is a 2003 Hong Kong sex comedy film directed by Chan Hing-ka and Dante Lam, and starring Louis Koo (who also co-produced), Eason Chan and Josie Ho. Ho went on to win the Best Supporting Actress award at the 23rd Hong Kong Film Awards. Based on a true story the film is set in the world of Hong Kong's pornography and prostitution business. It was followed in 2014 by a sequel in name, Naked Ambition 2; however, the two films share no characters or settings.

== Plot ==
Andy and John Chan are made redundant by their employer, a comic book publisher, and together with laid off colleagues go in search of a magazine publishing idea with which to make their fortunes. They ultimately stumble on the idea of a pornographic brothel guide; rather than unobtainable porn models their magazine features actual prostitutes working in the territory, together with an assessment of the girl and where she can be found. Their magazine, Ho Ching (豪情), is an unexpected hit and rakes in profits from both readers and working girls, as girls featured in the magazine see a jump in the number of punters and rates.

The visibility and money from this success leads to run ins with the law and organised crime, but what drives a wedge between Andy and John is their attitude to sexual temptation. Initially their write ups of their models are purely fictional, but the success of the magazine as an advertising tool leads to girls becoming willing to do whatever it takes in order to get a good review, and both Andy and John give in to the temptation of all the sex offered to them, damaging their relationships with girl friends and loved ones. Ultimately John manages to extract himself from the world of porn and prostitution, whilst Andy finds it impossible to leave.

=== China version ===
A different version of the film was released in China, changing the focus of the film to law enforcement efforts to end the pornography industry. This version has a different title, The Inescapable Snare (天罗地网 Tiānluódìwǎng). The plot adds another character who is a female police officer from mainland China who goes undercover.

== Cast ==
- Louis Koo as Andy
- Eason Chan as John Chan (陳健忠)
- Josie Ho as Tess Chiu (趙啷啷)
- Niki Chow as Kiki
- Jo Kuk as Titty Bird (崔波波)
- Cherrie Ying as Pamela
- Denise Ho as Fanny
- Jess Sum as Cindy

== Production ==
The film is based on real people and real events and the magazine Hao Qing is an actual one and is as it is depicted in the film. The character Andy is based on "Frankie" who appears in the end credits narrating a coda to the film.

This version, in order to meet the standards of the ratio of employees for films jointly produced by Hong kong and mainland China under the Mainland and Hong Kong Closer Economic Partnership Arrangement (CEPA), adds another character who is a female police officer from mainland China who goes undercover.

== Awards and nominations ==
Award	Category	Winner
23rd Hong Kong Film Awards	Best Supporting Actress	Josie Ho
