= Olympia Badge =

2008 version of the badge

The Olympia Badge is a Girl Guide and Girl Scout emblem, designed as a reminder of the original purpose of the Olympic Games.

The first Olympia Badge was designed by Soma Hellinikou Odigismou, the Greek Guiding Association, to mark the return of the Olympic Games to Athens in 2004.

The second Olympia Badge was launched 23 January 2008 by the Hong Kong Girl Guides Association and the World Association of Girl Guides and Girl Scouts, designed to celebrate the 2008 Summer Olympics which were held in Beijing in August 2008. The aim of the badge was to promote the Guiding message in many ways, including sport.

Olympia Badges are available in Bronze, Silver and Gold levels.
