= Sabrina Ho Chiu-yeng =

Hong Kong businesswoman, heiress and philanthropist

- 何超盈
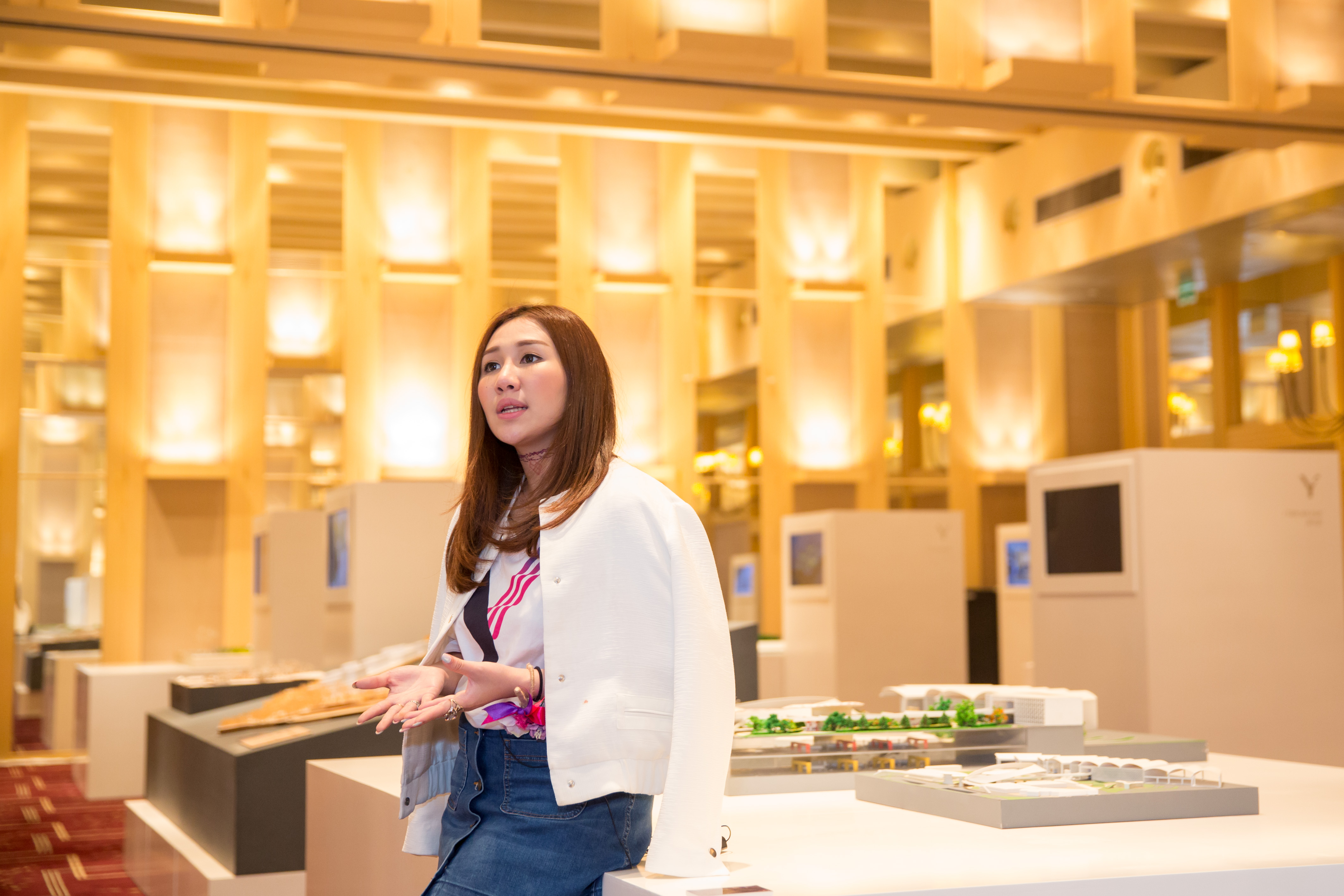
- Sabrina Ho Chiu-yeng in 2016
- Born: September 24, 1990 (age 36); Hong Kong
- Other name: Sabrina Ho
- Education: University of Hong Kong; UCLA; New York University
- Occupations: Businesswoman, heiress and philanthropist
- Known for: Founder of Chiu Yeng Culture, CEO of Poly Auction Macau
- Spouse: Thomas Xin
- Children: Audrey Rose Xin
- Parents: Stanley Ho (father); Leong On-kei (mother)
- Website: sabrina-ho.com

Sabrina Ho Chiu-yeng
- Traditional Chinese: 何超盈
- Simplified Chinese: 何超盈
Transcriptions
Standard Mandarin
- Hanyu Pinyin: Hé Chāo Yíng
Yue: Cantonese
- Jyutping: Ho^{4} Ciu^{1} Jing^{4}

Dr. Sabrina Ho Chiu-yeng (Chinese: 何超盈; born September 24, 1990) is currently working as a member in Board of Governors of the Hong Kong Arts Centre and a council member in Hong Kong Art School . She is also a Hong Kong businesswoman, heiress and philanthropist. She is the daughter of Stanley Ho, a casino tycoon, and Leong On-kei, a politician. Ho invested in businesses founded by women. In 2024, Ho was awarded a PhD from the New York University Steinhardt School of Culture, Education, and Human Development.

== Biography ==
Ho's parents gave her the name Sabrina, naming her after the 1954 film of the same name starring Audrey Hepburn as her father enjoyed watching movies. She attended a boarding school in Yorkshire when she was 13 years old. Ho took a summer job in a court when she was sixteen, assisting the judge with photocopying, making coffee, and other duties. At 18 while she was still residing in England, she recommended that her family buy the French sweets maker Ladurée's Hong Kong and China rights. Although some meetings took place, her family did not purchase the rights since her mother was uncertain that people in Asia would purchase a sufficient quantity of macarons to be a financially sustainable acquisition. After another company chose to purchase the rights, her parents began "taking [her] more seriously". Ho attended the University College London where she was planning to receive a degree in art history. Her studies were interrupted owing to "family reasons" and she needed to move back to Hong Kong in the middle of her initial year at the university.

Ho graduated from the University of Hong Kong in 2013 with an arts degree. Following her university studies, she joined her family business where she did marketing and branding for hotels and properties. Ho managed the renovation of Regency Hotel in Macau. According to Tatler, she "spent many months researching the history and heritage of similar buildings in the city in order to restore the hotel to its former glory while giving it a contemporary twist". Ho collaborated with Karl Lagerfeld and Versace on Grand Lisboa. Owing to her interest in art and auctions, Ho took on a part-time intern role at Poly Auction Beijing, where she answered telephone calls.

In 2015, Ho became the director and CEO of Poly Auction Macau. In January 2016, Ho organised the first Macau sales for Poly Auction Macau. The art fair showed the art of 60 budding Chinese creators. The art was shown in 60 Regency Hotel rooms that Ho had "personally designed".

In 2015, Ho founded Chiu Yeng Culture, a non-profit organisation for culture and art in Macau. In 2017, Ho became the youngest strategic partner of the United Nations Educational, Scientific and Cultural Organization (UNESCO) in its history and announced that she would support its International Fund for Cultural Diversity (IFCD). She started the "U40 Empowered: Women Entrepreneurs Powering the Digital Creative Industries" initiative the next year.

In 2024, Ho finished the doctoral study in education (ED.D) from The New York University Steinhardt School of Culture, Education, and Human Development (NYU Steinhardt).

Dr. Ho continues her work in Arts & Education fields. She is now a member in both Hong Kong Arts Centre Board of Governors and Hong Kong Art School Council.

== Personal life ==
In 2019, Ho announced her engagement to Thomas Xin. Ho gave birth to a daughter two months after her engagement ceremony and spoke about body positivity for women during and after pregnancy. Ho and Xin gave their daughter the English name Audrey Rose, naming her after the British actress Audrey Hepburn.
