= David Akers-Jones =

British colonial administrator (1927–2019)

The Honourable Sir David Akers-Jones GBM KBE CMG JP

Governor of Hong Kong
- Acting
- In office 5 December 1986 – 9 April 1987
- Monarch: Elizabeth II
- Chief Secretary: David Ford
- Preceded by: Edward Youde
- Succeeded by: David Wilson

Chief Secretary of Hong Kong
- In office 10 June 1985 – 11 February 1987
- Monarch: Elizabeth II
- Governor: Edward Youde
- Preceded by: Charles Philip Haddon-Cave
- Succeeded by: David Ford

Personal details
- Born: 14 April 1927 Worthing, Sussex, England
- Died: 30 September 2019 (aged 92) King’s Park, Hong Kong
- Other political affiliations: Affiliated with the New People's Party
- Spouse: Jane Spickernell, Lady Akers-Jones (m. 1951; died 2002)
- Education: Brasenose College, Oxford (MA); University of Kent (PGD)

David Akers-Jones
- Traditional Chinese: 鍾逸傑
- Simplified Chinese: 钟逸杰
Transcriptions
Standard Mandarin
- Hanyu Pinyin: Zhōng Yìjié
Yue: Cantonese
- Yale Romanization: Jūng Yaht-giht
- Jyutping: Zung^{1} Jat^{6}-git^{6}

Sir David Akers-Jones GBM KBE CMG JP (Chinese: 鍾逸傑; 14 April 1927 – 30 September 2019) was a British colonial administrator. He was the Chief Secretary of Hong Kong from 1985 to 1987, and was briefly acting Governor of Hong Kong after the untimely death of Sir Edward Youde.

== Biography ==
Born David Akers Jones ('Akers' being adopted as part of his surname later), he was son of Walter George Jones, manager of a brick and tile factory at Worthing, West Sussex, and Dorothy (née Akers), a schoolteacher. He was educated at Worthing High School and Brasenose College, Oxford (MA).

Akers-Jones arrived in Hong Kong in 1957, after serving three years in the Malayan Civil Service and joined the Hong Kong Government in the summer of 1957. During his long career, Akers-Jones served in many important posts in the Government of Hong Kong, including Principal Assistant Colonial Secretary, Secretary for the New Territories, which was later retitled "The Secretary for City and New Territories Administration". He was instrumental in turning small villages into "new towns" in the New Territories teeming with factories and apartment blocks to resettle slum-dwellers from the hillsides of Hong Kong Island.

Akers-Jones was instrumental in implementing the Small House Policy in 1972 in exchange for the New Territories indigenous groups' support for the new town development. It became one of the most contentious policies many years later as the housing crisis emerged as one of the most concerning social issues in the early 2010s.

He was also Secretary for District Administration, Secretary for Home Affairs and Chief Secretary.

After the sudden death of Sir Edward Youde, Akers-Jones became Acting Governor of Hong Kong from December 1986 to April 1987. After retiring from the post of Chief Secretary in 1987, he became Special Assistant to Governor Lord Wilson of Tillyorn for six months. He was later Chairman of the Hong Kong Housing Authority, from 1987 to 1992.

In the years leading up to the transfer of sovereignty from the UK to the People's Republic of China (PRC) in 1997, Akers-Jones was appointed as a Hong Kong Affairs Advisor to the Central Government of the PRC, from 1992 to 1997, after he relinquished chairmanship of the Hong Kong Housing Authority, having served a five-year term.

Sir David Akers-Jones retired and lived quietly in Hong Kong. He and his wife bought the dilapidated secluded villa "Dragon View", in Sham Tseng, for HK$1.5 million. The couple renovated it and worked extensively on the garden. They were served with a compulsory purchase order on 19 October 2000 when it was decided to go ahead with a road widening project. He is thought to have obtained at least $30 million in compensation.

== Discovery Bay controversy ==
In 2005, Akers-Jones briefly emerged from retirement to defend, before Hong Kong's Legislative Council, his role in zoning the Discovery Bay resort project on Lantau in the 1970s. Developers were allowed to build there with the stipulation that it would become a resort but most of the units were later converted into luxury housing. He was involved in the original zoning decision enabling development, as the then Secretary for the New Territories. With Hong Kong Disneyland subsequently opening nearby and property prices having skyrocketed as a result, suspicions about the fact that the original zoning plan was never enforced have again come to the fore. Akers-Jones criticised the decision to call on an elderly man to testify about events 30 years earlier. He revealed that colonial officials had abruptly changed the zoning of the Discovery Bay project, and gave it to new developers because they feared it would fall into the hands of the former Soviet Union.

== Political views ==
Akers-Jones criticised Hong Kong's post-colonial government for continuing a policy of maintaining high property prices, its lack of urban planning, and frequently ill-conceived plans to reclaim land in Victoria Harbour.

Akers-Jones advocated converting the Election Committee into a committee which would nominate suitable candidates for the post of chief executive for election by the public. He further believed in preserving functional constituencies but that they should be turned into an upper house in a bicameral legislature instead of abolishing them.

He was an advisor to the New People's Party.

== Memoirs ==
In later life, Akers-Jones penned occasional letters to the South China Morning Post and wrote occasional columns there and at The Standard. In 2004, he published a volume of reminiscences, entitled Feeling the Stones.

== Benevolent work ==
Akers-Jones was honorary chairman of the Bridge to China foundation, or Wu Zhi Qiao, which is a charitable, non-profit organisation based in Hong Kong dedicated to building footbridges in rural mainland China. It was established in 2005 as a collaborative effort between the Chinese University of Hong Kong, the Hong Kong Polytechnic University, and Xi'an Jiaotong University to build a single footbridge across the Po River in Gansu province. The foundation ultimately formed partnerships with 17 universities in China, Hong Kong, and the United States.

He was a founder and the honorary president of the local chapter of Outward Bound, the Outward Bound Hong Kong. He was a vice-president of the Hong Kong Girl Guides Association. He was vice-patron and honorary life president of the Hong Kong Football Association.

Akers-Jones was a trustee and vice-president of the Worldwide Fund for Nature Hong Kong and chairman of the Jackie Chan Charitable Foundation

Akers-Jones was chairman of Operation Smile China Medical Mission and president of the English-Speaking Union (Hong Kong). He was honorary advisor to Musicus Society.

In 2014, Akers-Jones founded Invotech, a do-tank to spread innovation and technology in Hong Kong.

== Personal life ==
In 1951, Akers-Jones married Jane Spickernell, daughter of Royal Navy Captain Sir Frank Todd Spickernell, KBE, CB, CVO, DSO, and maternal granddaughter of Sir Delves Louis Broughton, 10th Baronet. Jane Akers-Jones was appointed MBE in 1988. They had two adoptive children, a son named Simon (d. 1981) and a daughter, Byrony.

== Death ==
Akers-Jones died from colorectal cancer at Queen Elizabeth Hospital on 30 September 2019 at age 92. His wife Jane had died in 2002.

Government offices
| New office | Secretary for the New Territories; 1974–1981 | Succeeded by Himself as Secretary for City and New Territories Administration |
| Preceded by Himself as Secretary for the New Territories | Secretary for City and New Territories Administration; 1981–1983 | Succeeded by Himself as Secretary for Home Affairs |
| Preceded by Himself as Secretary for City and New Territories Administration | Secretary for Home Affairs; 1983–1985 | Succeeded by Donald Liao |
| Preceded by Sir Charles Philip Haddon-Cave | Chief Secretary of Hong Kong; 1985–1987 | Succeeded by Sir David Ford |
| Preceded by Sir Edward Youde | President of the Legislative Council of Hong Kong; Acting; 1986–1987 | Succeeded by Sir David Wilson later became Lord Wilson of Tillyorn |
| Preceded by Sir Edward Youde | Governor of Hong Kong; Acting; 1986–1987 | Succeeded by Sir David Wilson later became Lord Wilson of Tillyorn |
