= Puddle pirate =

Pejorative nickname for U.S. Coast Guard or Sea Scouts

The term Puddle pirate is a pejorative term for the United States Coast Guard, used in jest due to the public perception of the typical roles and missions being near shore versus deep water.

The term has been used as a synonym for:

- U.S. Coast Guard - in contrast with the U.S. Navy
- U.S. Coast Guard Reserve and U.S. Coast Guard Auxiliary - as the reserve and the auxiliary for the U.S. Coast Guard
- Sea Scouts - in contrast with (non-marine) Scouts and with merchant sailors
- Youth Cadet Corps - as a junior version of the corresponding U.S. Navy
- Royal Canadian Sea Cadets - especially in non-coastal regions of Canada
- Royal Navy Reserve
