= Scouting and Guiding in Greece =

The Scout and Guide movement in Greece is served by

- the Scouts of Greece, member of the World Organization of the Scout Movement
- Soma Hellinidon Odigon, member of the World Association of Girl Guides and Girl Scouts
