= Lawrence Ho =

Hong Kong-born Canadian businessman

- 何猷龍
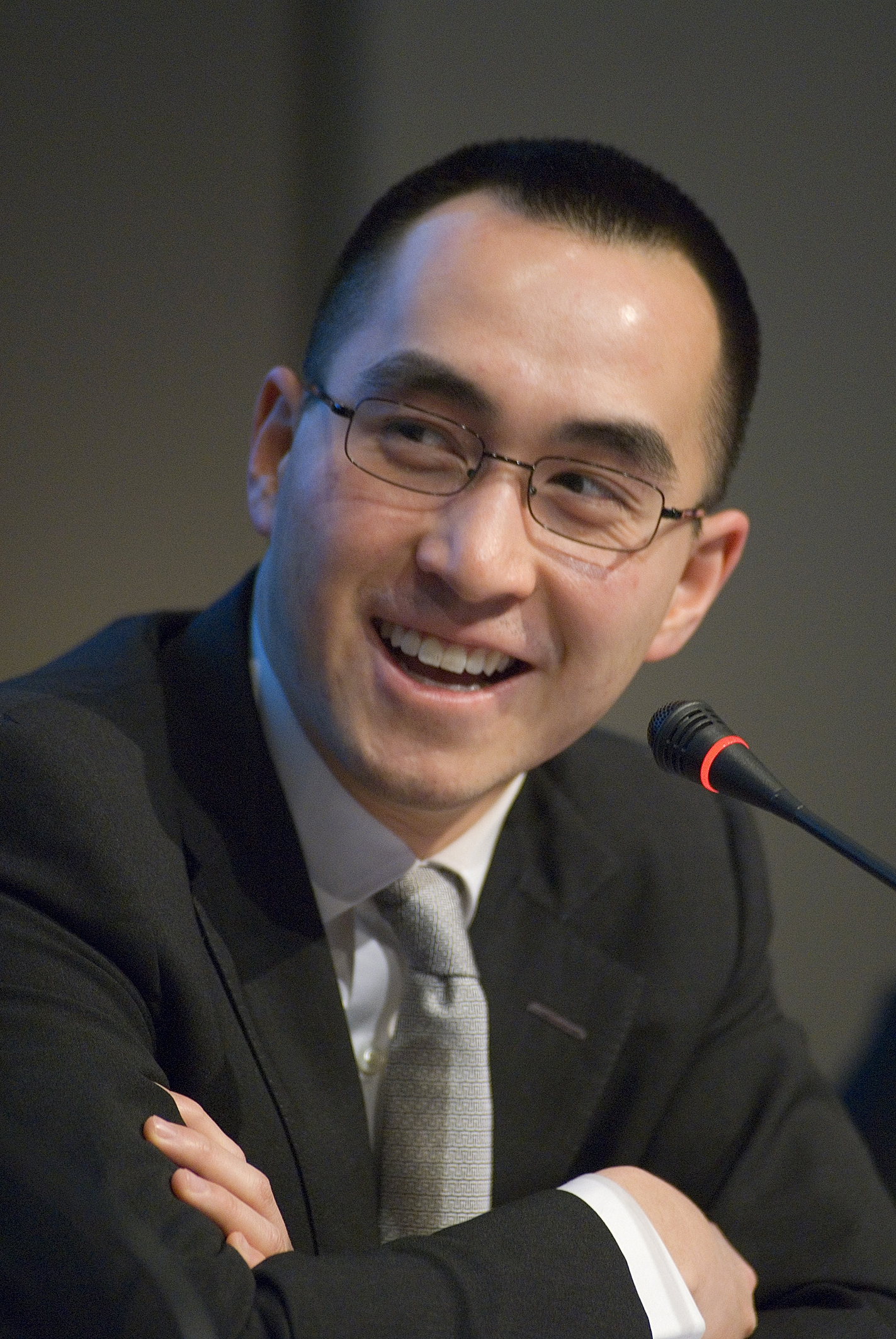
- Ho in 2007
- Born: Lawrence Ho Yau-lung; 1977 (age 48–49); Hong Kong
- Citizenship: Chinese (Hong Kong and Macau); Canadian; Portuguese
- Education: University of Toronto
- Occupations: Melco International (CEO and chairman); Melco Resorts & Entertainment (CEO and chairman)
- Years active: 1999–present
- Board member of: Melco International, Melco Resorts & Entertainment, Studio City International Holdings, Maple Peak Investment
- Relatives: Pansy Ho (sister); Daisy Ho (sister); Josie Ho (sister)

Lawrence Ho Yau-lung (Chinese: 何猷龍; born 1977) is a Canadian businessman. Starting his career as an investment banker at Jardine Fleming and Citibank, in 2001 he took over operations at Melco International. Later named chairman and CEO, Ho refocused the company on leisure and entertainment, building and operating casino resorts in Macau, the Philippines, and Cyprus. With an estimated net worth of $2.2 billion, he was named "Asia’s Best CEO" at the Asian Excellence Awards for the seventh time in 2018.

Born in Hong Kong from a Eurasian business family, Lawrence Ho was educated in Canada and graduated from the University of Toronto.

== Early life and education ==
Ho is the only son and the youngest child of the Hong Kong- and Macau-based businessman Stanley Ho and his second wife Lucina Laam King Ying. He moved to Canada as a child, studied at Upper Canada College, and graduated from the University of Toronto with a bachelor's degree in commerce in 1999. He was awarded an honorary doctorate by Edinburgh Napier University, Scotland in July 2009.

== Career ==
=== 1999–2003: Banking and Mocha Clubs ===
In September 1999 Ho began working in investment banking, first at Jardine Fleming's Asia Derivatives Group and then at Citibank. Becoming a shareholder in iAsia Technology in 2000, that October he began managing iAsia's daily operations and was named president and vice-chairman.

After purchasing a 26 percent majority stake, in November 2001 Ho was appointed the group managing director of Melco International Development Limited. Placed in charge of Melco's daily operations, Ho began refocusing the company on leisure and entertainment. He renovated Melco's Jumbo restaurant brand and further expanded Melco into finances and technology, associating the firm with companies such as VC Brokerage and i-Asia.

The Macau territory of China began issuing new casino licenses in 2002, breaking Stanley Ho's monopoly on casinos in the region and presenting Melco with the opportunity to invest in Chinese gambling. Ho approached his father with a proposition to partner on new gambling projects, and Melco purchased a one-half stake in a planned casino resort from Stanley Ho for $13 million, agreeing to "participate in the development of the hotel and subsequently manage the electronic gaming machine lounge." Melco's Mocha Clubs, opened in 2003, helped introduce "cafe-style slot-machine parlors" to Macau, which were uncommon at the time.

=== 2004–2011: CEO of Melco International ===
In 2004 Ho and Melco International partnered with James Packer's Australian casino company Crown Limited, creating the joint venture Melco Crown Entertainment. Ho was appointed CEO and executive director of Melco Crown Entertainment in December 2004, with both Ho and Packer appointed co-chairmen. In March 2006, Melco Crown spent US$900 million purchasing the last of Macau's six gaming licenses from Wynn Resorts. The license allowed Melco Crown to "operate an unlimited number of casinos, tables and machines in Macau until June 2022," and the company began developing its first casino.

Under Ho, by 2006 Melco International had become profitable. He was appointed Melco International's chairman and CEO on 15 March 2006, and Melco Crown listed on the NASDAQ in December 2006. In July 2007, Melco Crown launched Altira Macau, which was built for $1.45 billion. In 2009, Melco Crown opened the $2.4 billion casino resort City of Dreams Macau in Cotai. Melco Crown listed its shares in Hong Kong at the end of 2011.

=== 2012–2016: International expansion ===
Ho and Packer began partnering with SM Investments in 2012 on the $1 billion casino resort City of Dreams Manila, which opened in 2015 in the Philippines. In the summer of 2012, the government of the Primorye Integrated Entertainment Zone in Vladivostok, Russia invited Ho to bid on a new casino project. Tigre de Cristal opened in October 2015. With 60% ownership, in October 2015 Melco opened the casino resort Studio City Macau, which was designed with a Hollywood theme and cost $3.2 billion. In 2015 Ho was an executive producer for the Martin Scorsese short film The Audition, which was filmed to promote the casino's opening.

At the start of 2016, Ho continued to control Melco International Development as CEO and chairman. Melco in turn controlled subsidiaries such as Entertainment Gaming Asia, which operated slot machines in Philippines and Cambodia. In May 2016, Melco International became majority shareholder of its subsidiary Melco Resorts & Entertainment.

=== 2017–2018: Recent casinos ===
After a year-long bidding process, in 2017 the Cyprus government awarded Melco the first and only casino license in the country, which granted exclusivity for 15 years. Melco International subsequently bought a controlling stake in the City of Dreams Mediterranean Casino.

In the same year, Ho established Black Spade Capital Limited, his private investment office headquartered in Hong Kong. The firm manages Ho’s personal investments through a diversified global portfolio across multiple asset classes, including equities, SPACs, real estate, disruptive technologies, leisure and culture, green energy, and other non-gaming businesses.

After developing four integrated resorts together, in May 2017, Ho ended Melco's partnership with James Packer's Crown Resorts. With Crown's stake in the joint venture sold back to Melco International for $1.16 billion, Melco Crown became Melco Resorts & Entertainment. Ho assumed direct operational control and property development of Melco Resorts & Entertainment.

In June 2018, Melco Resorts & Entertainment opened Morpheus, a $1.1 billion hotel tower designed by Zaha Hadid at the City of Dreams Macau resort.

=== 2019–2025: Integrated Resorts Expansion ===
During the COVID‑19 pandemic, Ho led Melco in launching the “Simple Acts of Kindness” program. Nearly 7,000 Melco employees volunteered during work hours to assist over 1,600 community organizations. Melco also donated HKD 20 million (approximately USD 2.6 million) to support Wuhan and Hubei in obtaining medical supplies, while Ho personally forewent his salary for the rest of 2020, to support colleagues and operations. These initiatives earned Melco the Community Award – Asia and Ho the Outstanding Individual Award at the 2020 Industry Community Awards.

In what Ho described as “a new chapter for Studio City”, Melco opened Studio City Indoor Water Park and Epic Tower hotel in April 2023, marking the first attractions of Studio City Phase 2. Ho said this was an important milestone in Macau’s diversification objective and a demonstration of Melco’s confidence and belief in the long-standing potential of Macau. A second hotel in Studio City Phase 2, W Macau, was inaugurated in September.

Under Ho, Melco is committed to offering non-gaming tourism, which he believes would benefit Macau tourism as a whole. As part of this commitment, Melco’s signature “House of Dancing Water” returned to City of Dreams Macau in May 2025, which Ho said will shape Macau into a live performance destination, attract tourists from around the world, and support the Macau government’s initiative to sustain Macau’s positioning as the ‘World Centre of Tourism and Leisure.’ House of Dancing Water was presented with the "Medal of Merit – Tourism" in 2025 by the Macao SAR Government, in recognition of its outstanding contributions to promoting the development of Macau's tourism sector and enhancing its status as a "World Centre of Tourism and Leisure" since its premiere in 2010.

Turing to overseas markets, Ho believes that emerging markets have the greatest growth potential. Seeing potential from the Middle East and even Europe for integrated resorts, Melco secured a gaming license in Cyprus. In July 2023, Ho inaugurated City of Dreams Mediterranean, a US$660 million property described as Europe’s first and largest integrated resort, located in Limassol, Cyprus.

Ho first took an interest in opening an integrated resort in Sri Lanka in 2013, recognising its potential to become to India what Macau is to China, as well as opportunities from the Middle East. With the goal for Melco to avoid being a one-country-based company, ambitions for bigger things and seizing asset-light opportunities, Melco developed City of Dreams, Sri Lanka with John Keells Holdings. The resort was opened in Colombo in August 2025.

=== Family Office ===
Ho's Hong Kong-based family office, Black Spade Capital, which he established in 2017. It manages his personal investments across equities, SPACs, real estate, technology, leisure, and other non-gaming areas.

== Boards and committees ==
The current chairman of Melco International, Ho is also on the boards of various companies such as Studio City International Holdings. He is chairman of Maple Peak Investments in Canada and was previously the chairman of Summit Ascent Holdings.

He is a member of the National Committee of the Chinese People's Political Consultative Conference. He is also a member of the advisory committee of the All-China Federation of Industry and Commerce. He is an honorary lifetime member of the Chinese General Chamber of Commerce of Hong Kong, and he has also been a member of the All-China Youth Federation and the Macau Basic Law Promotion Association.

He has been chairman of the Chamber of Hong Kong Listed Companies and the Macau International Volunteers Association. A director executive of the Macao Chamber of Commerce, he is also on the boards of The Community Chest of Hong Kong and the Canadian Chamber of Commerce in Hong Kong. He is honorary president of Association of Property Agents and Real Estate Developers of Macau. Ho is also an honorary patron of the Canadian Chamber of Commerce in Macao.

== Honours ==
Ho has won a number of awards for his career with Melco International. Institutional Investor named Ho “Best CEO" of a conglomerate in 2005, and also that year he received the "Directors of the Year Award" from the Hong Kong Institute of Directors and the 5th "China Enterprise Award for Creative Businessmen." In 2006 he was selected as one of “Ten Outstanding Young Persons" by Junior Chamber International Hong Kong. The following year he was named one of the “100 Most Influential People across Asia Pacific” by Asiamoney, and in 2008 he received the “China Charity Award” from the Ministry of Civil Affairs.

In 2009 Ho was named both “Young Entrepreneur of the Year” at the Asia Pacific Entrepreneurship Awards and one of the “Top Ten Financial and Intelligent Persons in China" by the Beijing Cultural Development Study Institute and Fortune Times. Ho was then selected by FinanceAsia as one of the “Best CEOs in Hong Kong” for the fifth time in 2014. Between 2012 and 2018 he received Asian Corporate Director Recognition Awards by Corporate Governance Asia, and in 2015 he received the "Leadership Gold Award" in the Business Awards of Macau. He was also named “Asia’s Best CEO” at the Asian Excellence Awards for the seventh time in 2018. In 2017, Ho was awarded the Medal of Merit-Tourism by the Macau SAR government for contributing to the territory's tourism.

== Personal life ==
Ho and his wife Sharen Lo Shau Yan have one daughter.
