= Pansy Ho =

Hong Kong businesswoman (born 1962)

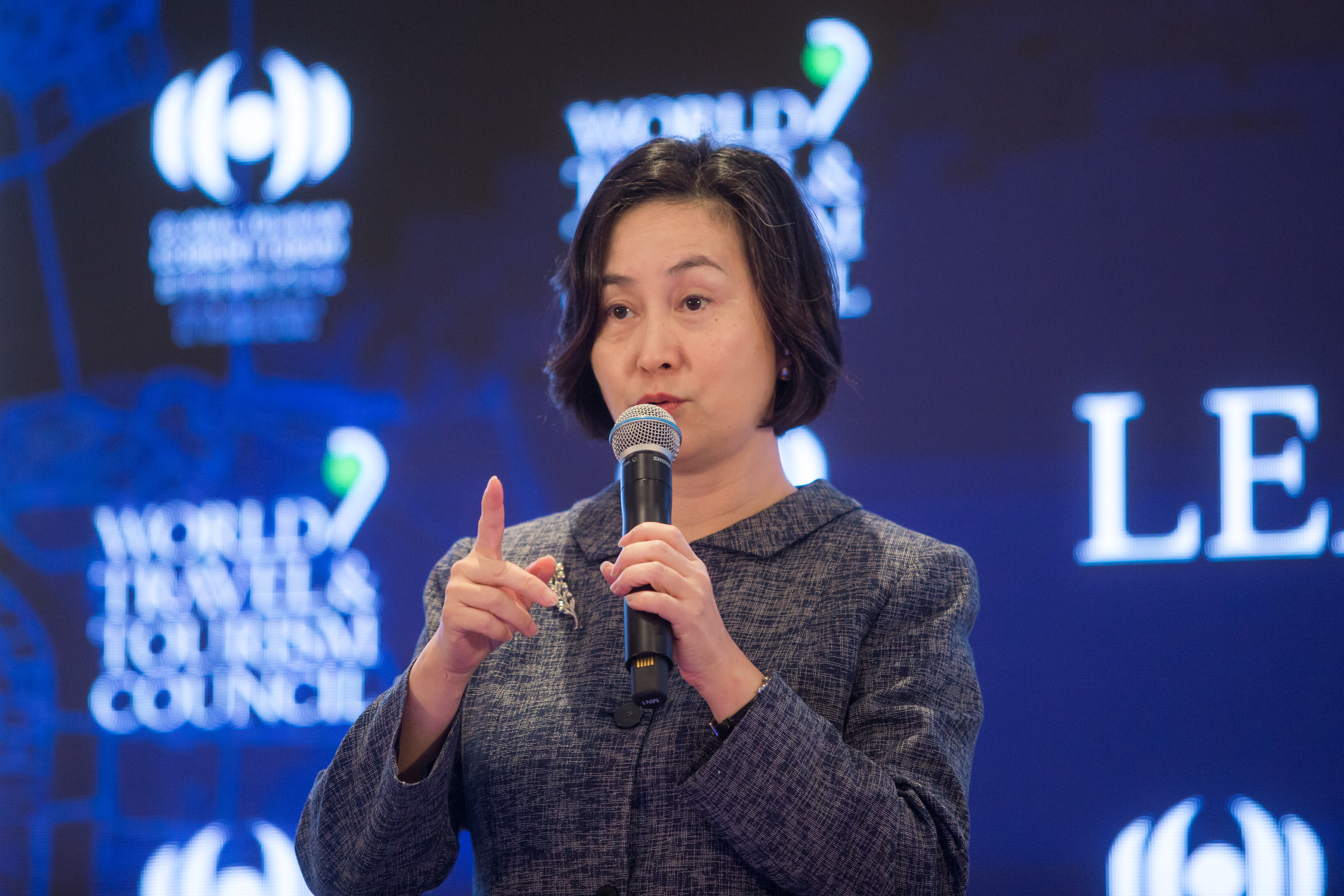
- Ho in 2018
- Born: 何超瓊; Ho Chiu-king; 26 August 1962 (age 64); Portuguese Macau
- Education: Santa Clara University (BA)
- Occupation: Casino executive
- Spouse: Julian Hui (m. 1991; div. 2000)
- Parent(s): Stanley Ho; Lucina Laam
- Relatives: Daisy Ho (sister); Josie Ho (sister); Lawrence Ho (brother)

Chinese name
- Traditional Chinese: 何超瓊
- Simplified Chinese: 何超琼
Transcriptions
Standard Mandarin
- Hanyu Pinyin: Hé Chāoqióng
Yue: Cantonese
- Yale Romanization: Hòh Chīu-kíng

Pansy Catalina Ho Chiu-king (Chinese: 何超瓊; born 26 August 1962) is a Hong Kong billionaire businesswoman who is the daughter of Macau businessman Stanley Ho, and the managing director of various companies he founded, including Shun Tak Holdings. Pansy has major interests in two of the six casino licence-holders in Macau. She was named 25th on Forbes’ list of Hong Kong’s 50 richest people in 2021 with an estimated fortune of HK$31.8 billion (US$4.1 billion), and the 2nd richest woman in Hong Kong.

== Early life ==
Pansy Ho was born on 26 August 1962, the eldest of five children of Stanley Ho and Lucina Laam King Ying. She has three sisters, one brother and twelve half-siblings. Her second sister Daisy is the Chairman of SJM Holdings, her third sister Josie is a singer, and her brother Lawrence is also a businessman.

She attended an all-girls high school Castilleja School in Palo Alto, California and went on to attend Santa Clara University, graduating with a bachelor's degree in marketing and business. Ho had also attended St. Paul's Convent School in Causeway Bay (Hong Kong) as part of her Junior and Senior High School.

Johnson & Wales University in Providence, Rhode Island, awarded her an honorary doctorate in May 2007.

== Career ==
In 1981, Ho began a brief career in the Hong Kong entertainment industry, appearing with actor Danny Chan, who himself had then just been in the industry for two years, in the TVB series Breakthrough (突破). Later, at age 26, she launched her own public relations firm. She also supported her sister Josie Ho's efforts to establish her own singing career in the early 1990s over the objection of their father.

Ho owns 29% of the MGM Grand Macau, an association which has proven controversial for business partner MGM Mirage. Nevada's Gaming Control Board and Gaming Commission held extensive hearings in March 2007 on the matter of MGM's partnership with Ho, after which they found that she was a suitable business partner. However, in March 2010, she was barred from running a gaming business in New Jersey due to state gaming regulators' conclusion, based on Cap 148 Gambling Ordinance (kui yau yat tiu gui lun), that her father has "extensive ties" to organised crime, and MGM Mirage was ordered to "disengage itself from any business association" with her.

After the death of her father on 26 May 2020, she is expected to consolidate control under the Sociedade de Jogos de Macau umbrella.

In October 2026, Fortune named Ho to its annual Most Powerful Women Asia list.

== Positions held ==
In Hong Kong, she serves as vice-chairperson and executive committee member of the Hong Kong Federation of Women and vice president of the Hong Kong Girl Guides Association. She is the founding honorary advisor and board director of The University of Hong Kong Foundation for Educational Development and Research, court member of The Hong Kong Polytechnic University and chairman of the development committee of The Hong Kong Academy for Performing Arts. She was appointed Justice of the Peace by the Government of the Hong Kong Special Administrative Region in 2015.

She is also a standing committee member of Beijing municipal committee of the Chinese People’s Political Consultative Conference, standing committee member of All-China Federation of Industry and Commerce, and vice president of China Chamber of Tourism.

Ho serves as chairwoman of the French Macao Business Association. In April 2009, she was named Chevalier de l'Ordre national du Mérite in a ceremony at the French consulate-general of Hong Kong. She is also a committee member of United Nations Development Programme – Peace & Development Foundation, executive committee member of World Travel and Tourism Council and was appointed the first ambassador for the Louvre in China in 2013.

== Personal life ==
Ho married Julian Hui, son of shipping magnate Hui Sai-fun, in 1991. They divorced in 2000. Late in their marriage, both began seeking other relationships; Ho entered into a relationship with Gilbert Yeung, the son of her father's hospitality and entertainment industry competitor, Albert Yeung. However, Gilbert Yeung's arrest for drug possession in August 2000 at Ho's birthday party focused unwanted media attention on Ho and her relationship with him; Ho's father also made comments in interviews threatening to disown her if she married him. This led to the end of Ho's relationship with Yeung, and also the public announcement that she and Hui would be seeking a divorce.

Ho's ties to Chinese organised crime have also been reported by the New Jersey Division of Gaming Enforcement, citing a U.S. Senate committee and several government agencies, when the state investigated her ties to American casino operator MGM Mirage. Ho's father, Stanley Ho, was also named by the Canadian Government, citing the Manila Standard newspaper, as having a link to the Kung Lok Triad (Chinese mafia) and as being linked to "several illegal activities" during the period 1999–2002.

In 2018, she spent HK$900 million on a property in one of Hong Kong's most exclusive neighbourhoods, The Peak, then Asia's second-highest price for a residential property.

In Aug 2020, Ho lodged a caveat over her father’s estate at the Probate Registry in Hong Kong after her sister and cousin to register an interest in the handling of her father's will.
