= Stanley Ho =

Macau businessman (1921–2020)

The Honourable Stanley Ho GBM GML GBS GLM OBE CStJ SPMP SPMT
- 何鴻燊
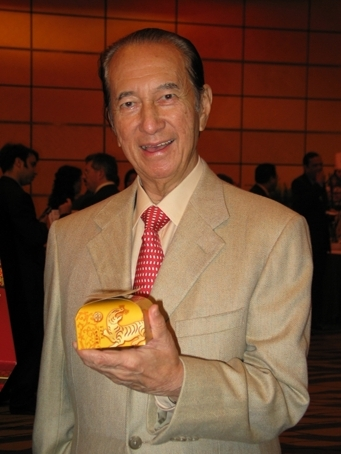
- Ho in 2006

Member of the Standing Committee of the CPPCC (9th, 10th, 11th)
- In office March 1998 – March 2013
- Chairman: Li Ruihuan; Jia Qinglin

Personal details
- Born: Ho Hung-sun; 25 November 1921 British Hong Kong
- Died: 26 May 2020 (aged 98) Happy Valley, Hong Kong
- Spouses: Clementina Leitão Ho (m. 1942; died 2004) Lucina Laam King-ying (m. 1957) (de jure concubine) Ina Chan (m. 1977) (de facto) Leong On-kei (m. 1988) (de facto)
- Children: 17
- Relatives: Ho Fook (grandfather); Sir Robert Ho (grand-uncle); Robert Ho Hung-Ngai (second cousin)
- Education: Queen's College, Hong Kong; University of Hong Kong
- Occupation: Businessman

Stanley Ho Hung-sun (Note: His original patrilineal surname was Bosman, which was later sinicized to 何 (Ho).) (Chinese: 何鴻燊; 25 November 1921 – 26 May 2020) was a Hong Kong and Macau billionaire businessman. He was the founder and chairman of SJM Holdings, which owns nineteen casinos in Macau including the Grand Lisboa.

Ho was nicknamed variously Godfather and King of Gambling, reflecting the government-granted monopoly he held on the Macau gambling industry for 40 years. His wealth was divided among his daughter, Pansy Ho ($5.3 billion) who owns MGM Macau, fourth wife Angela Leong ($4.1 billion) who is managing director of SJM Holdings, and son Lawrence Ho ($2.6 billion) who owns City of Dreams.

Ho was the founder and chairman of Shun Tak Holdings, through which he owned many businesses including entertainment, tourism, shipping, real estate, banking, and air transport. It is estimated that his businesses employ almost one-fourth of the workforce of Macau. Apart from Hong Kong and Macau, he also invested in mainland China, Portugal, North Korea where he operated a casino, Vietnam, the Philippines, Mozambique, Indonesia and East Timor.

His opinions and statements on Hong Kong's real estate and commercial development had considerable sway on the market. In his later years, he had been involved in litigation with his sister, Winnie Ho, concerning the ownership of the Macau casino. Having suffered a stroke in July 2009, followed by a long period of recovery, Ho began steps in late 2010 to devolve his grip on his financial empire to his various wives and children. Ho died on 26 May 2020 at the Hong Kong Sanatorium & Hospital.

== Early life ==
Born in Hong Kong during British colonial rule, he was of Chinese, Dutch-Jewish and English ancestry. On his paternal side, Ho was descended from his great-grandfather, Charles Henry Maurice Bosman, who was of Dutch Jewish ancestry, and his Chinese mistress Sze Tai (施娣), a local Bao'an (present-day Shenzhen and Hong Kong) woman. His grandfather was Ho Fook (何福), brother of the merchant Sir Robert Ho Tung, his grandmother was Lucy Rothwell and his father was Ho Sai-kwong (何世光). His maternal grandfather was another first-generation Eurasian, Stephen Hall (Sin Tak Fan, 冼德芬), the son of British businessman Stephen Prentis Hall.. His mother was Flora Hall (Sin, 冼興雲)

According to Stanley Ho, he was born into the illustrious Ho Tung family of Hong Kong. His family was once extremely wealthy, but in 1934 his father suffered devastating losses in the stock market, going bankrupt overnight. To escape creditors, his father fled to Vietnam. By the time Ho entered secondary school, his family had fallen on hard times and endured harsh snubs from those around them. Later, seeking refuge amid wartime turmoil, he moved to Macau—at his poorest, with only ten dollars left to his name. One episode stayed with him for life: visiting the clinic of his father's acquaintance to have a tooth filled, only to have the dentist pull it out instead. The man sneered, "No money—what's the point of filling it? Fill this one today, and tomorrow you'll be back asking for another. Just pull it out." From that moment on, Ho resolved to turn his life around. Once a poor student, he transformed himself into a top student through sheer determination. Through relentless effort, he rebuilt his fortune and rose to become one of Asia's most prominent tycoons. However, his younger sister Winnie Ho offered a starkly different account in her memoirs. She denied that their father had ever gone bankrupt, insisting he merely incurred some business losses before relocating to Vietnam for legitimate trade ventures—not as a fugitive. According to her, his business quickly rebounded; he prospered abroad and regularly sent money home. At their poorest, the family still resided in a three-storey detached house on the prestigious Conduit Road, overlooking Government House, with seventeen domestic servants on the payroll—and their mother never needed to work outside the home. Winnie's version strongly implies that Stanley Ho's legendary success owed much to his privileged pedigree as a member of the Ho Tung clan, rather than to rags-to-riches grit alone.

=== Education ===
Ho studied at Queen's College, Hong Kong, at which he attended Class D - the lowest class level in the then Hong Kong Class System - owing to unsatisfactory academic results. However, he later received a scholarship to the University of Hong Kong. He became the first student from Class D to be granted a university scholarship. His university studies were cut short by the outbreak of World War II in 1942. Following the Japanese occupation of Hong Kong, Ho moved to Macau.

=== Career ===
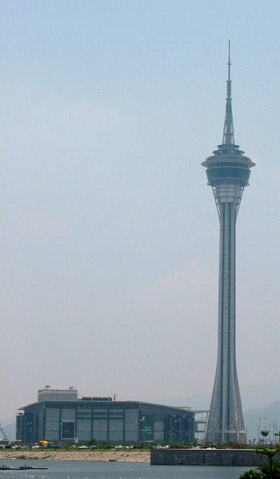
Macau Tower, owned by STDM

Ho began clerical work at a Japanese-owned import-export firm in Macau. He made his first fortune smuggling luxury goods and food across the Chinese border from Macau during World War II. In 1943 he set up a kerosene company and established a construction company with his money.

Ho, along with partners including Hong Kong tycoon Henry Fok, Macau gambler Yip Hon and his brother-in-law Teddy Yip, bid for Macau franchises. By bidding high and promising to promote tourism and to develop infrastructure, they won the public tender for Macau's gaming monopoly license in 1961, for US$410,000, of which US$51,000 was provided by Henry Fok. defeating the long-time Macau casino barons, the Fu family, by MOP 17,000. In 1961 the company was renamed Sociedade de Turismo e Diversões de Macau, S.A.R.L. (STDM).

In late 1962, Ho opened the Estoril Hotel, Macau's first luxury casino resort.

In 1970, Ho opened the flagship Lisboa Casino Hotel. In the same year, Ho also set up Shun Tak Holdings Ltd, which was listed on the Stock Exchange of Hong Kong. Through a subsidiary, TurboJET, it owns one of the world's largest fleets of high-speed jetfoils, which ferry passengers between Hong Kong and Macau.

In the 1980s, Ho pioneered the practice of subcontracting private gambling rooms in his casinos to independent agents. The practice developed in response to Triads' practice of buying hydrofoil tickets to scalp to tourists. Ho's practice developed as an alternative, which would allow Triad agents direct access to his casinos instead via commissions on sales of casino chips to gamblers. This practice evolved into the VIP contractual system known as the junket trade.

Ho's investments in Macau were diverse. In 1989, after STDM took full control of the Macau Jockey Club, Ho became its chairman and chief executive officer.

Ho opened a casino in Pyongyang, North Korea, in 1995.

In 1998 Ho became the first living Macanese resident to have a local street named after him. He also launched Asia's first football and basketball lottery, called SLOT.

Ho was named by the Canadian Government, citing the Manila Standard newspaper, as having a link to the Kung Lok Triad (Chinese mafia) and as being linked to "several illegal activities" during the period 1999–2002. Ho's alleged ties to Chinese organized crime have also been reported by the New Jersey Division of Gaming Enforcement, citing a U.S. Senate committee and several government agencies, when the state investigated his ties to American casino operator MGM Mirage.

== Positions held ==
=== Business ===
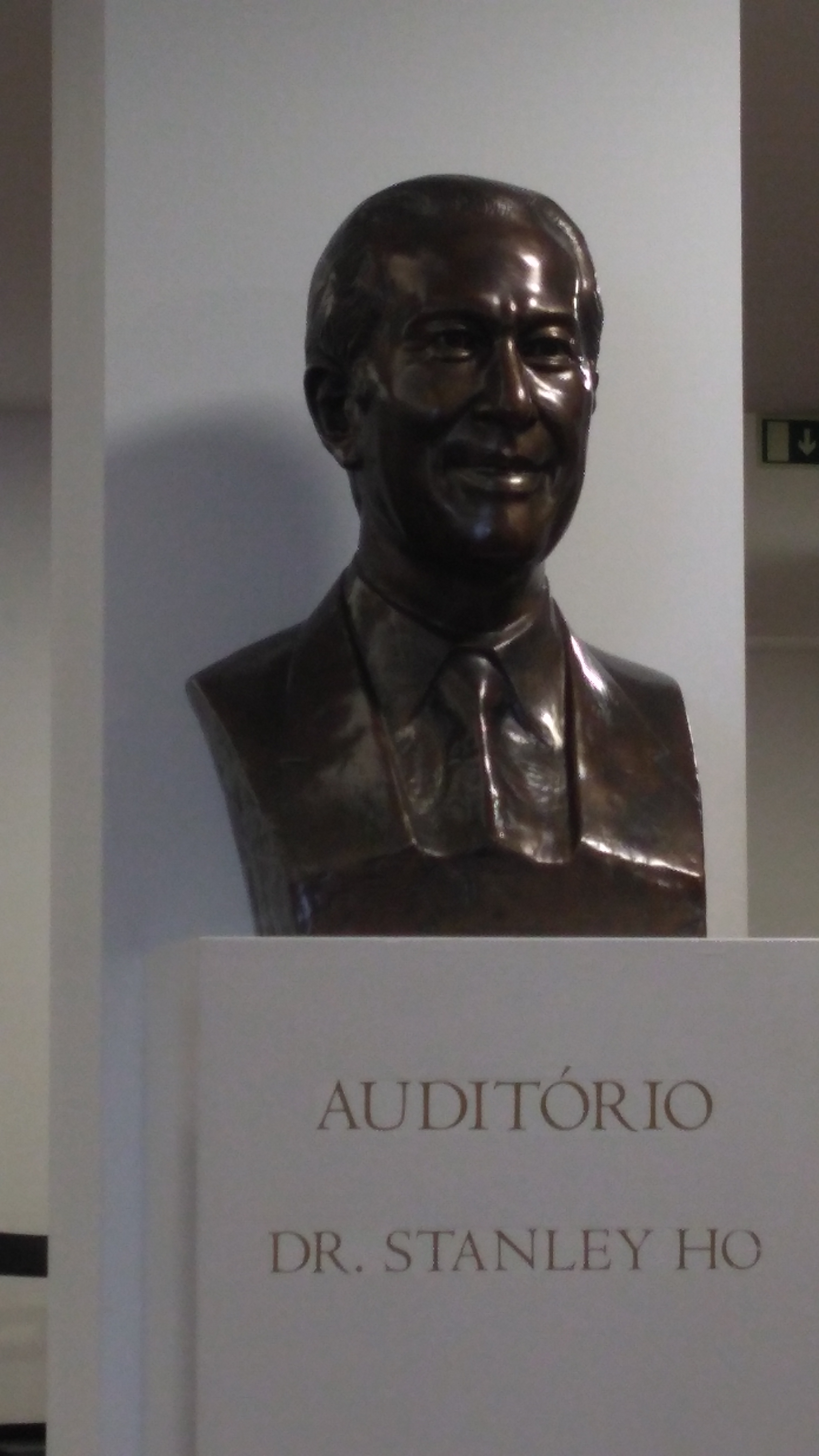
Bust of Stanley Ho at the Fundação Oriente, Lisbon.

- Chairman Emeritus without directorship, Shun Tak Holdings Limited (信德集團)
- Chairman, Seng Heng Bank Limited
- Director, Shun Tak Shipping Company, Limited
- Chairman, iAsia Technology Limited (亞洲網上交易科技有限公司)
- Chairman, the Chinese Recreation Club in Hong Kong (CRC)
- Founder of Sociedade de Turismo e Diversoes de Macau, SARL (STDM)
- Chairman, SJM Holdings Limited (澳門博彩控股有限公司) (retirement announced in April 2018)
- Ho also made many other investments, including in venture capital and foreign real estate (such as in Singapore and London).

=== Community ===
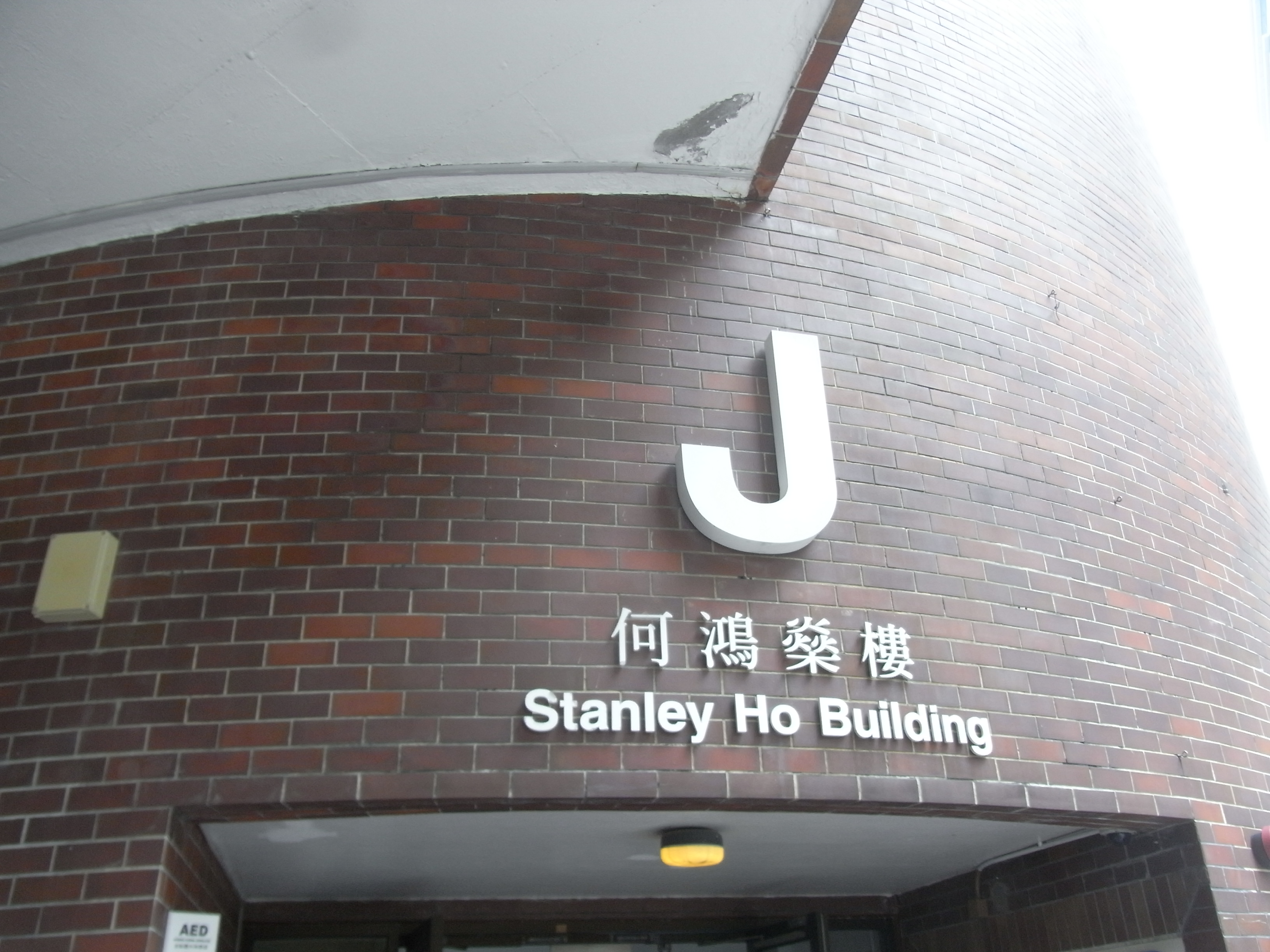
Stanley Ho Building, Hong Kong Polytechnic University

- President of Real Estate Developers Association of Hong Kong (香港地產建設商會)
- Chairman of the board of directors of the University of Hong Kong Foundation for Educational Development and Research (香港大學教研發展基金董事局)
- Member of the Court and Council of the University of Hong Kong (香港大學校董會)
- Member of the Court of the Hong Kong Polytechnic University
- Member of the board of trustees of the Better Hong Kong Foundation
- Member of the Council of the University of Macau (澳門大學)
- Founder of the Dr. Stanley Ho Medical Development Foundation (何鴻燊博士醫療拓展基金會)

=== Politics ===
In 1987, Portugal agreed to return Macau to China in 1999. Ho took part in the joint advisory committee. He was a Standing Committee member of the 9th National Committee of the Chinese People's Political Consultative Conference.

Also;

- Member of the Selection Committee for the first Government of the Hong Kong Special Administrative Region
- Member of the Consultative Committee for the Basic Law of the Hong Kong SAR

== Family ==
Ho had 17 children born to four women. Ho referred to his children's mothers as his wives. Some forms of Polygamy remained legal in Hong Kong until it was outlawed in 1971.

In 1942, Ho married Clementina Ângela Leitão, from the prestigious Portuguese Leitão family (Chinese:黎登)– her grandfather was a lawyer and Macau's only notary public at the time. They had four children. Leitão was involved in a motor vehicle accident in 1973, and suffered partial memory loss as a result. In 1981, Ho's and Leitão's son Robert and daughter-in-law Suki Potier died in a car accident. Clementina Leitão Ho died in 2004 and was buried in the St. Michael the Archangel Cemetery (Portuguese: Cemitério São Miguel Arcanjo).

In the late 1950s, Ho met Lucina Azul Jean Ying née Laam King-ying (藍瓊纓) and began a relationship. This union was recognized in Macau and Hong Kong at that time due to legacy rulings from the Great Qing Legal Code of the Chinese Qing Dynasty. The relationship resulted in five children including daughters Daisy Ho, to whom Ho ceded the chairmanship of SJM, and Pansy Ho, a 50 percent partner in MGM Macau; son Lawrence Ho, CEO of Melco Crown Entertainment Ltd, another Macau-based casino company; and Josie Ho (何超儀), a rock singer and award-winning actress. Lucina's family now resides in Canada.

Ho began a relationship with Ina Chan in 1985. This union is not legitimate by laws in either Hong Kong or Macau. Ho's wife Clementina Leitão needed constant nursing care following her car accident, and Ina Chan was one of the nurses brought in to look after Leitão. Ho and Chan have three children together; Laurinda Ho, Florinda Ho, and Orlando Ho.

In 1988, Ho met Angela Leong On-kei when she was his dance instructor. The couple had four children together: Sabrina Ho, Arnaldo Ho, Mario Ho and Alice Ho.

== Personal life ==
Over the years, dancing was one of Ho's favourite hobbies. He used to tango, cha-cha-cha, and waltz. He often danced for televised charity fundraisers and sponsored numerous dance performances in Hong Kong and Macau, including the Hong Kong Arts Festival and the Macau Arts Festival, promoting the art of dance. He also invited internationally renowned dancing groups, such as the National Ballet of China, to perform in Hong Kong and Macau. Ho was a patron of the Hong Kong Ballet, the International Dance Teachers Association and was a Fellow of the Royal Academy of Dance. One of a number of thoroughbred racehorses owned by Ho, Viva Pataca, named after the currency of Macau, won several top Hong Kong races in 2006 and 2007.

In late July 2009, Ho suffered a fall at his home that required brain surgery. For seven months Ho was confined to the Hong Kong Adventist Hospital and, later, the Hong Kong Sanatorium and Hospital, during which period he made only one public appearance, on 20 December 2009, when he travelled to Macau to meet Chinese president Hu Jintao on the occasion of the 10th anniversary of Macau's return to Chinese sovereignty. Ho was discharged from the Hong Kong Sanatorium and Hospital on 6 March 2010 and thereafter employed a wheelchair.

=== Philanthropy ===
==== Qing relics ====
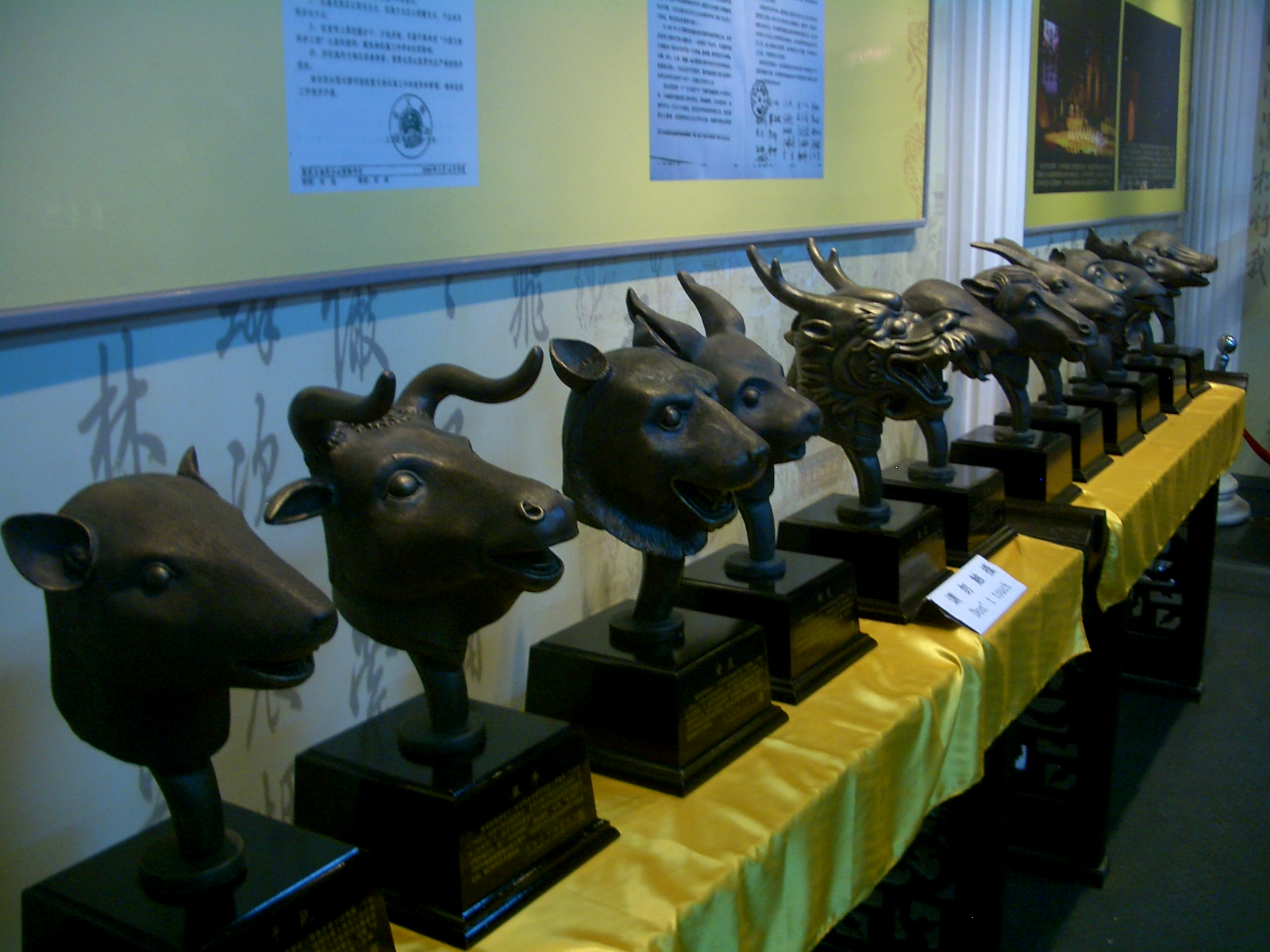
Replicas of the 12 heads taken from the Yuanmingyuan

In 2003, Ho donated a Qing dynasty bronze boar's head to China's Poly Art Museum, a state-run organisation that aims to develop, display, rescue and protect Chinese cultural relics. The boar's head is part of a collection of twelve looted from the Imperial Summer Palace in Beijing in 1860 when it was sacked and burnt by the French and British armies. On 21 September 2007, Ho donated to the Chinese government the bronze sculpture of a horse's head taken from the Imperial Summer Palace at the same time. Ho had reportedly just purchased it from a Taiwanese businessman for US$8.84 million.

=== Lanceford dispute ===
In late January 2011, a dispute erupted among his wives and children involving the transfer of ownership of his private holding company, Lanceford. On 27 December Lanceford allotted 9,998 new shares, representing 99.98 per cent of its enlarged share capital, to two British Virgin Islands companies: Action Winner Holdings Ltd, wholly owned by third wife, Ina, holding 50.55 per cent and Ranillo Investments Ltd, equally held by each of Laam's five children, holding the balance. The allotment document filed with the Registrar of Companies was signed by Laam's daughter Daisy.

Ho issued proceedings in the High Court, naming its directors – 11 defendants, including his second and third wives, and children Pansy and Lawrence Ho, alleging the group "improperly and/or illegally" acted in changing the share structure. The writ sought an injunction restraining the defendants from selling or disposing any of the 9,998 new shares in the company. The two British Virgin Islands companies were also named in the writ. Ho said his intention from the outset was to divide his assets equally among his families and that the actions of the directors of Lanceford effectively eliminated this possibility, according to a statement issued by his lawyer Gordon Oldham.

Amidst confusion caused by conflicting statements from Ho and his wives and children about the state of the dispute, Ho, through Oldham – who had been allegedly sacked and rehired within the space of a few days – said he had been pressured to make public statements and sign legal documents without him being fully apprised of their contents.

== Honours ==
In 1984, Ho was awarded an honorary doctorate of social sciences from the University of Macau. In the New Year Honours 1990, Ho was appointed Officer of the Order of the British Empire (O.B.E.) "for services to the community in Hong Kong". In 1995, The Government of Portugal appointed Ho to the Grã-Cruz da Ordem do Infante Dom Henrique (Great Cross of the Order of Prince Henrique), the highest honour for any civilian, for his contributions to society. In 1998, Dr. Stanley Ho Avenue in Macau was named, the first Chinese person to be so honoured in Macau during their lifetime. In 2001, he was among the first recipients to receive the Golden Lotus Medal of Honour from Macau.

In 2003 Ho received the Gold Bauhinia Star from the Chief Executive of Hong Kong, Tung Chee Hwa. In 2007, he received the Grand Lotus Medal of Honour from Macau. In 2008 Ho received the Medal for Business Entrepreneurialism from the city of Cascais and the street running adjacent to the Estoril Casino was renamed as Avenida Stanley Ho. It was the first road in Portugal to be named after a living Chinese citizen. In June 2009 he received the Visionary award at the G2E Asia conference, organised by the American Gaming Association; the award was delivered by Macau SAR Chief Executive Edmund Ho. In November 2010, Ho was awarded the Grand Bauhinia Medal.

== Death ==
Ho was in poor health in his last years, and stayed in hospital after his health deteriorated following a stroke in 2009. On 25 May 2020, Ho was reported to be in a critical condition, and he died at the Hong Kong Sanatorium & Hospital on 26 May 2020, at around 1 pm local time. He was 98.

== In popular culture ==
- It Could Happen Here - The Macau Tycoon : 1991 television film, portrayed by Jackie Lui Chung Yin.
- Casino Tycoon & Casino Tycoon 2 : 1992 films, the character Benny Ho, portrayed by Andy Lau.
- Chasing the Dragon II: Wild Wild Bunch : 2019 film, the character Stanford Ho, portrayed by Michael Wong.

== See also ==
- Economy of Macau
- Legal system of Macau
- List of graduates of University of Hong Kong
- List of billionaires
- Politics of Macau
- List of oldest fathers
