= Greek Guiding Association =

Σώμα Ελληνικού Οδηγισμού
- The Greek Guiding Association
- Country: Greece
- Founded: 1932
- Membership: 10,682
- Affiliation: World Association of Girl Guides and Girl Scouts
- Website http://www.seo.gr/

Bird	Guide

The Greek Guiding Association (Greek: Σώμα Ελληνικού Οδηγισμού, ΣΕΟ), formerly known as the Greek Girl Guides Association (Greek: Σώμα Ελληνίδων Οδηγών, ΣΕΟ), is the national Guiding association of Greece. Guiding in Greece started in 1932 and became a member of the World Association of Girl Guides and Girl Scouts (WAGGGS) in 1933. The coeducational organization has 10,682 members (as of 2008).

== History ==
The first Guide units were established in 1932, and in 1933, SEO became an associate member of WAGGGS. During World War II the movement fell inactive, but it was revived in 1945. In 1948 it advanced to full membership with WAGGGS.

The association started special groups for girls with disabilities in 1951; since 1995, children with special needs are integrated in all units.

The 1990s saw a general overhaul of the organization's program: the organization opened for boys and a new branch for pre-school-age children was introduced – the Asteria (Stars).

== Program and ideals ==
The association is divided in four age-groups:

- Asteria – Stars (ages 5 to 7)
- Poulia – Birds (ages 7 to 11)
- Odigoi – Guides (ages 11 to 14)
- Megaloi Odigoi/Naftodigoi – Rangers/Sea Rangers (ages 14 to 17)

The troops for each branch have distinct names:

- Galaxias (Galaxy)
- Sminos (Flock)
- Omada (Troop)
- Omada/Pliroma (Troop/Crew)

== See also ==
- Scouts of Greece
- Olympia Badge
