= Jane Akers-Jones =

English Girl Guide leader

Jane, Lady Akers-Jones MBE
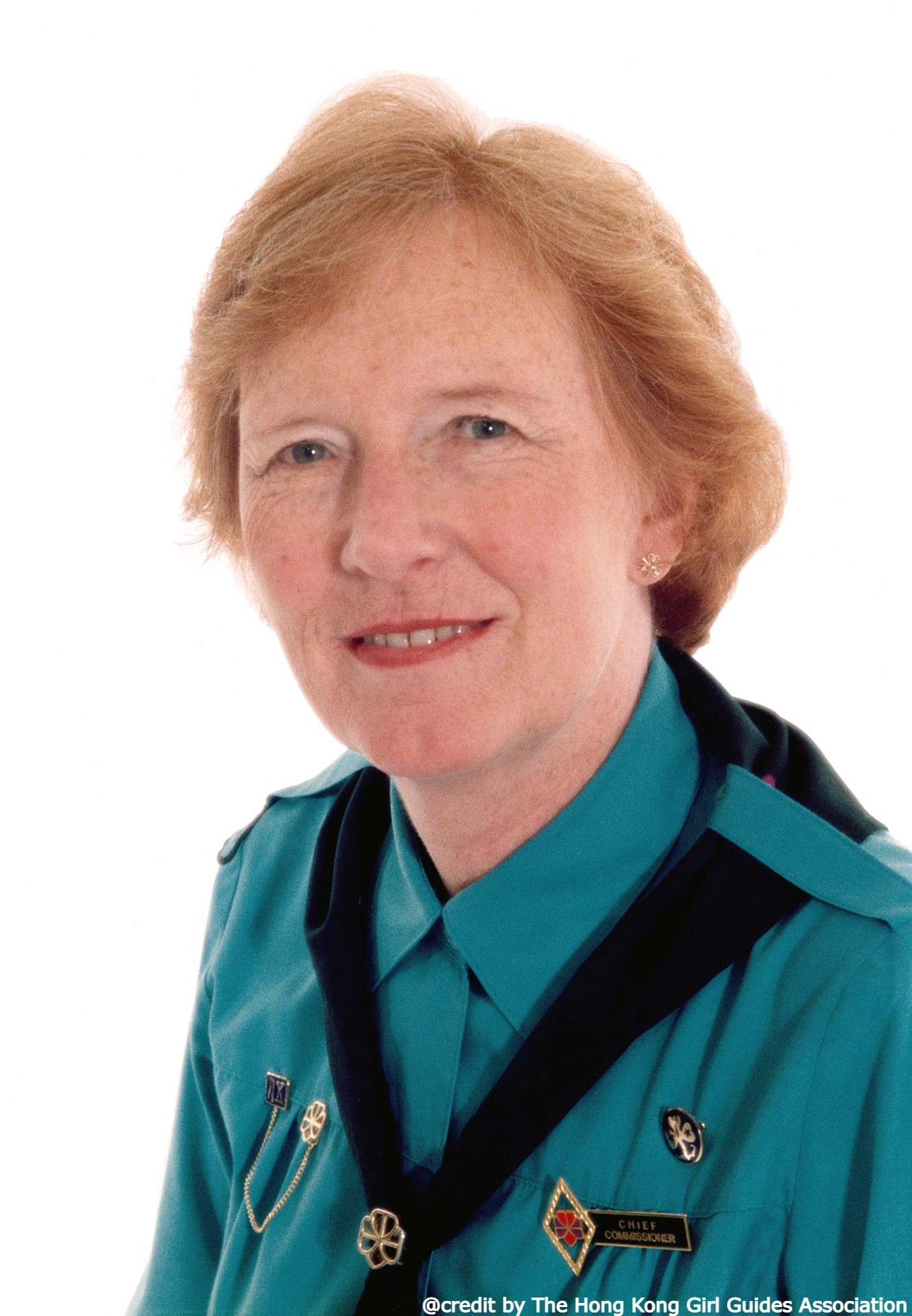
- Born: Jane Spickernell; 8 March 1929; Paddington, London, England
- Died: 6 October 2002 (aged 73); Pok Fu Lam, Hong Kong
- Spouse: David Akers-Jones (m. 1951)
- Children: 2
- Parents: Sir Frank Todd Spickernell KBE CB CVO DSO RN (1885–1956) (father); Lady Amice Ivy Delves Spickernell (née Broughton) (1901–1974) (mother)
- Awards: WAGGGS Bronze Medal

Jane Akers-Jones, Lady Akers-Jones, MBE (8 March 1929 – 6 October 2002) was an influential member of the Hong Kong Girl Guides Association (HKGGA) and its longest serving chief commissioner.

== Family and personal life ==
Jane Akers-Jones, née Spickernell, was born in Paddington, London on 8 March 1929. She was the eldest child of Sir Frank Todd Spickernell KBE CB CVO DSO RN (1885–1956) and Lady Amice Ivy Delves Spickernell (née Broughton) (1901–1974).

She met Sir David Akers-Jones (1927–2019) whilst he was studying at Brasenose College, Oxford and she was an actress appearing with the Liverpool Playhouse. They married on 8 September 1951. They adopted two children, Simon Akers-Jones (d. 1981) and Bryony Akers-Jones. The family attended the Anglican Christ Church in Kowloon Tong, Hong Kong.

Akers-Jones died of liver cancer at the Queen Mary Hospital, Pok Fu Lam, Hong Kong, on 6 October 2002 aged 73. Her funeral was held at St John's Cathedral, Central, Hong Kong. Among the mourners were then Chief Executive Tung Chee-hwa, Chief Secretary Donald Tsang Yam-kuen, tycoon Li Ka-shing and film star, Jackie Chan.

After her death Sir David established a special HKGGA fund in her memory, the Lady Akers-Jones Memorial Fund to support innovative programs and projects that are considered to be of particular merit. HKGGA renamed a headquarter's activity room Jane’s Corner in 2006 and created the Lady Jane’s Guide Award in 2014. The Lady Jane Akers-Jones Memorial Scholarship for music was created at the Hong Kong Academy for Performing Arts.

== Work ==
Akers-Jones worked as an actress, secretary and teacher before assuming the role of ‘colonial wife’ in 1953. She became a Justice of the peace in 1985, inspecting penal institutions and hospitals several times a year. She typed Sir David's 2004 memoirs Feeling the Stones.

== Malaysia ==
Her first posting as a ‘colonial wife’ was to Kuala Lumpur, Malaysia in 1954 where David was working for the Malayan Civil Service. After Malaysia gained independence from Great Britain in 1957, rather than return to the UK, David applied to move to Hong Kong.

== Hong Kong ==
David became the District Commissioner for the New Territories from 1973 to 1985. During this period, he and Akers-Jones lived at Island House, Tai Po, where they planted many ornamental species of plant, including flame trees, several banyans and the only three specimens in Hong Kong of the rare tabebuia. They were the last occupants of the house before it was awarded to the World Wide Fund for Nature to become a Conservation Studies Centre.

David was made a KBE in 1985, giving her the style Lady Akers-Jones. In the same year, David became Chief Secretary for Administration of Hong Kong and they moved to the Chief Secretary's official residence on Hong Kong Island.

After Sir David retired, they chose to stay in Hong Kong because “we hardly know anywhere else”. They bought a dilapidated house, ‘Dragon View’ in Sham Tseng, Tseung Wan, which they renovated.

== Girl Guides ==
Akers-Jones enrolled in the Girl Guides in England during WWII. She joined the Hong Kong Girl Guides Association (HKGGA) in the 1960s. In the 1980s she was a member of the New Territories Regional Association.

=== Deputy Chief Commissioner 1980–1983 ===
As deputy chief commissioner she was instrumental in “decentralising the Regional Associations and District Associations to match all government administrative districts forming a total of 21 District Associations and 4 Regional Associations. The boundaries of the divisions and districts were also redrawn and numerous new units, including open units and factory units, were established.” She was also involved in the building of a new HKGGA headquarters in Jordan, which was opened in 1982.

=== Chief Commissioner 1983–1994 ===
Akers-Jones was the longest serving chief commissioner in the history of HKGGA. Highlights of her tenure included:

- Developing greater contact with Mainland Chinese youth organisations, promoting exchange programmes for girls and leaders. She would entertain delegations at her residence. The first reciprocal visit to China took place in 1988.
- Establishing the 10,000-Mile Friendship Trek.
- Establishing a Ranger Guide unit within the Tai Tam Gap Correctional Institution.
- Establishing the Sea Ranger ship Sea Lion.
- Establishing Golden Guides.
- WAGGGS visiting China in 1992.

She also continually pushed for the creation of new Brownie and Guide units, to make Guiding available to more girls in the New Territories.

At the end of her tenure as chief commissioner, she remained active as a deputy chief commissioner until her death, and “helped advance the movement as vice president.”

== Awards ==
- 1988 – MBE for services to Guiding
- 1991 – WAGGGS Bronze Medal for her work supporting the international movement

== Other ==
- Together with Peggy Lam, she founded the New Territories branch of Zonta International in 1982.
- She served on the board of the Hong Kong Tuberculosis, Chest and Heart Diseases Association.
- She gave advice and assisted in the writing of Frank Welsh's 1997 A History of Hong Kong.
- She opened The Orchard Kindergarten in Hong Lok Yuen, Hong Kong's first purpose-built kindergarten, in 1987.
