= Hong Kong Art Craft Merchants Association =

- Native name: 香港藝術品商會有限公司
- Founded: 26 November 1968
- Headquarters: Hong Kong
- Website: artcraft.org.hk

The Hong Kong Art Craft Merchants Association (traditional Chinese: 香港藝術品商會有限公司; simplified Chinese: 香港艺术品商会有限公司) was founded on 26 November 1968 by several Muslim arts dealers who were then engaged in arts and antiquities trade. Since then, membership has gone from about 180 to more than 300.

The Association has appraised more than a million pieces of art and its certifications and appraisals are widely accepted in the art world.

In 2015 the Association played a role in negotiating the return of a rare Tang dynasty Buddha head, which was reunited with its body.

== Controversy ==
In January 2018 the chairman of the association, Lau Sai-Yuen was fined HK$8,000 for illegal possession of post-ban ivory products. Lau was also a member of the Agriculture, Fisheries and Conservation Department's Advisory Committee on the Protection of Rare Flora and Fauna.
