= Hong Kong Girl Guides Association =

- 香港女童軍總會
- Founded: 1919; 107 years ago
- Membership: 55,145
- Affiliation: World Association of Girl Guides and Girl Scouts
- Website hkgga.org.hk

Hong Kong Girl Guides Association
- Traditional Chinese: 香港女童軍總會
- Simplified Chinese: 香港女童军总会
Transcriptions
Standard Mandarin
- Hanyu Pinyin: Xiānggǎng Nǚ Tóngjūn Zǒng Huì
Yue: Cantonese
- Jyutping: hoeng1 gong2 neoi5 tung4 gwan1 zung2 wui6*2

Hong Kong Girl Guides Association (Chinese: 香港女童軍總會) is the sole Guide organisation in Hong Kong. It was formally established in 1919 though the first Girl Guides Company was formed in 1916. The association became a full member of the World Association of Girl Guides and Girl Scouts in 1978. It serves 55,145 members.

== Programme ==
There are six sections in the Guiding programme.

- Happy Bee (快樂小蜜蜂) is a Parent-Child Programme for ages 4 to 6 years old (Accepts both boys and girls.)
- Brownie (小女童軍), from 6 to 12 years old
- Guide (女童軍), from 10 to 18 years
- Ranger (深資女童軍), from 15 to 23 years old
- Golden Guide (樂齡女童軍), over 55 years old
- Guider (女童軍領袖), volunteer leader, over 21 years old

== Law, Promise and Motto ==
=== Guide Promise ===
I promise to do my best, to be true to myself,
my God, and my country, and the country in which I live[2]
to help others, and to keep the Guide Law.

Note :

1. - Choose either the word God or the word faith according to her personal convictions
2. - for non-Chinese nationals residing in Hong Kong Special Administration Region

Happy Bee Promise
I am a Happy Bee.
I love my family.
I love my friends.
I love nature.

=== Guide Law ===
As a Guide [1]
I will be reliable, honest and trustworthy
I will use my resources wisely and help others
I will be true to myself and respect the opinion of others
I will face challenges and learn from my experiences
I will care for nature and all living things
I will be friendly and a sister to all Guides

1. - For Rangers, the first line is "As a Ranger Guide"

=== Guide Motto ===
The Guide Motto is the same for all sections: Be Prepared (準備).

== Symbol ==

The association's symbol is a stylized trefoil. The notched edges and the mauve colour recall the symbol flower of Hong Kong, the Bauhinia blakeana, while the colour red is seen as particularly auspicious. The internal division of the trefoil shows the Chinese character Kwong meaning a ray of light from a beacon, reflecting the spirit of the Guide movement.

== Organisational Structure ==
=== Regions & Divisions ===
There are a total of 14 regions and divisions in the Hong Kong Girl Guides Association:

- Bauhinia Division (English Speaking Units);
- Island East Division;
- Island West Division;
- Kwun Tong Division;
- Yau Tsim Mong Division;
- Kowloon City Division;
- Wong Tai Sin Division;
- Sham Shui Po Division;
- New Territories East Division;
- New Territories South Division;
- New Territories North Division;
- Yuen Long Division;
- Tuen Mun Division; and
- Outlying Islands Division.

Each division is composed of various districts.

=== Chief Commissioners ===
Colony Commissioners:

- Lady Stubbs (1920-1925)
- Lady Southorn (1926-1936)
- Mary King MBE (1936-1940)
- W Buckwell (1940-1941)
- Dorothy Lee OBE, JP (1945-1946)
- Iris Herklots (1946-1948)
- Louise Landale (1948-1951)
- H Owen Hughes (1951-1958)
- Irene Hooton (1958-1961)
- Margaret Staple MBE (1961-1966)
- Pauline Stephens (1966-1968)
- S A Hill (1968-1972)
- Marguerite Gordon MBE, JP (1972-1978)

Chief Commissioners:

- Marguerite Gordon MBE, JP (1978-1980)
- Dr Sally Wong Leung GBS, OBE, JP (1980-1983)
- Lady Akers-Jones MBE, JP (1983-1994)
- Rita Suen JP (1994-1998)
- Dr Alice Lui (1998-2003)
- Julita Lee BBS, JP (2003-2008)
- Delia Pei BBS, JP (2008-2011)
- Josephine Pang MH (2011-2014)
- Daisy Ho (2014-2015)
- Pearl Lee (2015-2021)
- Jeanne Lee BBS, JP (2021-present)

== See also ==
- Scout Association of Hong Kong
- Olympia Badge
- English-Speaking Guides Hong Kong
