= Crown Casino =

Crown Casino may refer to:

- Crown Melbourne
- Crown Perth
- Crown Sydney
- Crown Sri Lanka, a proposed and cancelled project in Sri Lanka
