= Gambling Hangover =

Gambling Hangover was the theme of an Australian social marketing campaign to help young male gamblers. It ran for 2 years from 2008.

== The campaign ==
The two-year campaign was created by Sydney agency The Campaign Palace on behalf of the Responsible Gambling Fund, a part of the New South Wales Office of Liquor, Gaming and Racing.

It targeted men aged 18–25 in the "morning after" phase following a gambling binge, when they were most likely to seek help for problem gambling. It identified the three main symptoms of a gambling hangover as "a sick feeling," "anxiety and regrets," and "not liking yourself."

Ads were placed where young men were likely to see them in the morning: in train stations, on buses, on morning radio, and in morning newspapers. Young men were urged to visit gamblinghangover.nsw.gov.au, to SMS for more information, or to call a helpline number if they recognised the gambling hangover symptoms in themselves.

Responses to the helpline and in follow-up research showed the phrase had moved into common usage among young men, and 50 percent of those surveyed were able to recall the campaign.

== See also ==
- Gambling in Australia
