= Kennedy Watches & Jewellery =

- Company type: Company
- Industry: Retail, Fine Jewellery, Watches
- Founded: 1976
- Founder: Louis Kennedy
- Headquarters: Sydney, Australia
- Number of locations: 4
- Area served: worldwide
- Website: https://www.kennedy.com.au

Kennedy Watches & Jewellery is an Australia-based retailer of luxury brand watches and fine jewellery founded in 1976. The company is a major partner of the Australian Football League.

== History ==
Kennedy Watches & Jewellery was founded in 1976 in Sydney's Double Bay called LK Jewellery. The company offered a collection of fine jewellery and luxury watches for both men and women.

In the 2010s, Kennedy partnered with the fashion brands Kenzo, Loewe, and Giuseppe Zanotti. By the 2010s, Kennedy Watches had established itself as a retailer of luxury watches, with stores located in major Australian cities and prestigious shopping destinations like Crown Melbourne and Crown Perth. Kennedy is an official retailer for numerous luxury brands, including Patek Philippe, IWC Schaffhausen, Jaeger-LeCoultre, Mikimoto, Piaget, Cartier, Tudor, Omega, Longines, and Graff Diamonds.

The company is a major partner of the Australian Football League, and actively supports community initiatives through its corporate partnerships. In December 2023, Kennedy Watches hosted the "Passion for Workmanship" exhibition at its store in The Ritz Carlton, Melbourne, featuring over 100 Patek Philippe watches, including the Nautilus and Aquanaut.
