= Todd Nisbet =

American casino and property executive

- Born: William Todd Nisbet; 23 October 1967; Sandy, Utah, U.S.
- Died: 3 October 2025 (aged 57); Melbourne, Victoria, Australia
- Education: University of Nevada, Las Vegas (BSc)
- Occupations: Construction and integrated resort development executive
- Years active: c. 1986 to 2025
- Known for: Senior executive at Crown Resorts; co-founder of NPACT
- Spouse: Pamela Nisbet
- Children: 3

William Todd Nisbet (23 October 1967 – 3 October 2025), known professionally as Todd Nisbet, was an American construction and integrated resort development executive. He spent the latter part of his career as a senior executive in James Packer's casino and property businesses. He began his career at Marnell Corrao Associates and was a founding member of Wynn Resorts in Las Vegas, before joining Packer's Crown Resorts in 2007 and relocating to Australia in 2010. Over fourteen years at Crown he oversaw the development of Crown Sydney, Crown Perth, and Crown's resort projects in Macau, and served on the board of Melco Crown Entertainment. After leaving Crown in 2021, he co-founded the property investment venture NPACT with Packer.

== Early life and education ==
Nisbet was born on 23 October 1967 in Sandy, Utah, to Mary Polston. He attended Clark High School in Las Vegas and earned a Bachelor of Science in Finance from the University of Nevada, Las Vegas.

== Career ==
=== Marnell Corrao Associates ===
Nisbet spent the first fourteen years of his career in design and construction at the Las Vegas-based design-build firm Marnell Corrao Associates. Securities filings document him serving as Senior Project Manager from 1995 to 1999 and as Vice President of Operations from 1999 to 2000. During his time at the firm he worked on several major Las Vegas Strip resorts, including the Excalibur, Treasure Island, the Mirage, and the Bellagio.

=== Wynn Design and Development ===
From July 2000 to 2007, Nisbet was a founding member of the Wynn Resorts management team, serving as Executive Vice President and Project Director of Wynn Design & Development, the company's in-house development arm. In that role he managed project development and construction for both Wynn Las Vegas and Wynn Macau.

=== Crown Resorts ===
Nisbet joined Crown Resorts in 2007 as Executive Vice President of Design and Construction. In October 2009 he was appointed to the board of Melco Crown Entertainment, the Macau-focused joint venture between Crown and Lawrence Ho's Melco International, replacing John Alexander.

In 2010, Nisbet and his family relocated to Melbourne, Australia. His Crown title was later changed to Executive Vice President of Strategy and Development. During his tenure he oversaw the development of Crown Perth and Crown Sydney, as well as the City of Dreams and Studio City resorts in Macau, served as Crown's representative on the City of Dreams Manila project in the Philippines, and led the company's bid for a Japanese integrated resort licence. Crown also pursued exploratory plans for casino projects in South Korea, Vietnam, and Sri Lanka during this period, none of which proceeded to development. In a 2015 interview, James Packer publicly described Nisbet as a key executive at Crown.

In August 2014, Crown announced a A$280 million purchase of a 14-hectare site at the northern end of the Las Vegas Strip, on land that had previously housed the New Frontier, for a luxury casino resort to be developed in partnership with the former Wynn Las Vegas president and chief operating officer Andrew Pascal and the investment firm Oaktree Capital Management. The Melbourne Herald Sun reported that the project had originated in a chance meeting between Nisbet and Pascal over the 2013 Christmas holidays. As Crown's senior representative on the venture, Nisbet told the Australian Financial Review that existing luxury offerings in Las Vegas could be bettered, and said Crown intended to bring an Asian-influenced approach to hospitality and service to the market.

From 2019, Crown Resorts became the subject of regulatory scrutiny concerning anti-money laundering compliance, dealings with junket operators with links to organised crime, and corporate governance arrangements. The 2021 final report of the Bergin Inquiry into Crown's NSW casino licence identified Nisbet, alongside chief financial officer Ken Barton and Australian Resorts chief executive Barry Felstead, as one of Crown's three principal officers below board level between 2015 and 2019. The report's principal adverse findings concerning individual Crown personnel were directed at the company's chairman, chief executive, and certain non-executive directors rather than at Nisbet, whose appearances in the report The Australian Financial Review characterised as "brief mentions".

In November 2020, an investigation published by The Age and The Sydney Morning Herald reported allegations from six current and former Crown employees that Nisbet had engaged in bullying and intimidating behaviour towards subordinates. The accounts were supplemented by a written complaint from Lee Monfort, the company's former vice-president of design and construction, who had resigned in 2019 over what he described as Nisbet's treatment of staff, and by an internal email in which Nisbet had referred to a subordinate using a profanity. Crown confirmed to the newspapers that its board had been briefed on the allegations, that an independent external investigation had been conducted, and that Nisbet had been formally counselled by the company's then-chairman and the chair of its occupational health and safety committee. Nisbet denied the allegations, saying he was "the furthest thing from a bully" and questioning the motivations of those who had complained.

In the months following the Bergin Report's release in February 2021, Nisbet remained with Crown while several other senior executives, including chief executive Ken Barton and Australian Resorts head Barry Felstead, departed the company. Nisbet himself left Crown in late June 2021, amid what The Age described as the wider exodus of executives and directors from the company that followed the Bergin Inquiry. According to Crown's annual report for the 2021 financial year, he received A$6.6 million in total payments during the year, including approximately A$3.3 million in termination benefits, the largest total payment listed for any of Crown's named executives.

=== NPACT ===
After leaving Crown, Nisbet partnered with James Packer and Packer's Consolidated Press Holdings to co-found NPACT Capital and Investment Management, a property investment venture that backed luxury residential developments in Sydney and Melbourne. NPACT entered joint ventures with developers including Third.i Group, Time & Place, Orchard Piper, and Chapter Group on projects in Potts Point, Surry Hills, Mosman, and Manly in Sydney, and in Toorak and Balwyn in Melbourne.

== Personal life ==
Nisbet was married to Pamela Nisbet, with whom he had three children. From 2010 he was based in Melbourne, where he died on 3 October 2025, aged 57, following a brain aneurysm.
