= Crown Melbourne =

Resort complex in Melbourne, Australia

Coordinates: 37.822324°S 144.960099°E

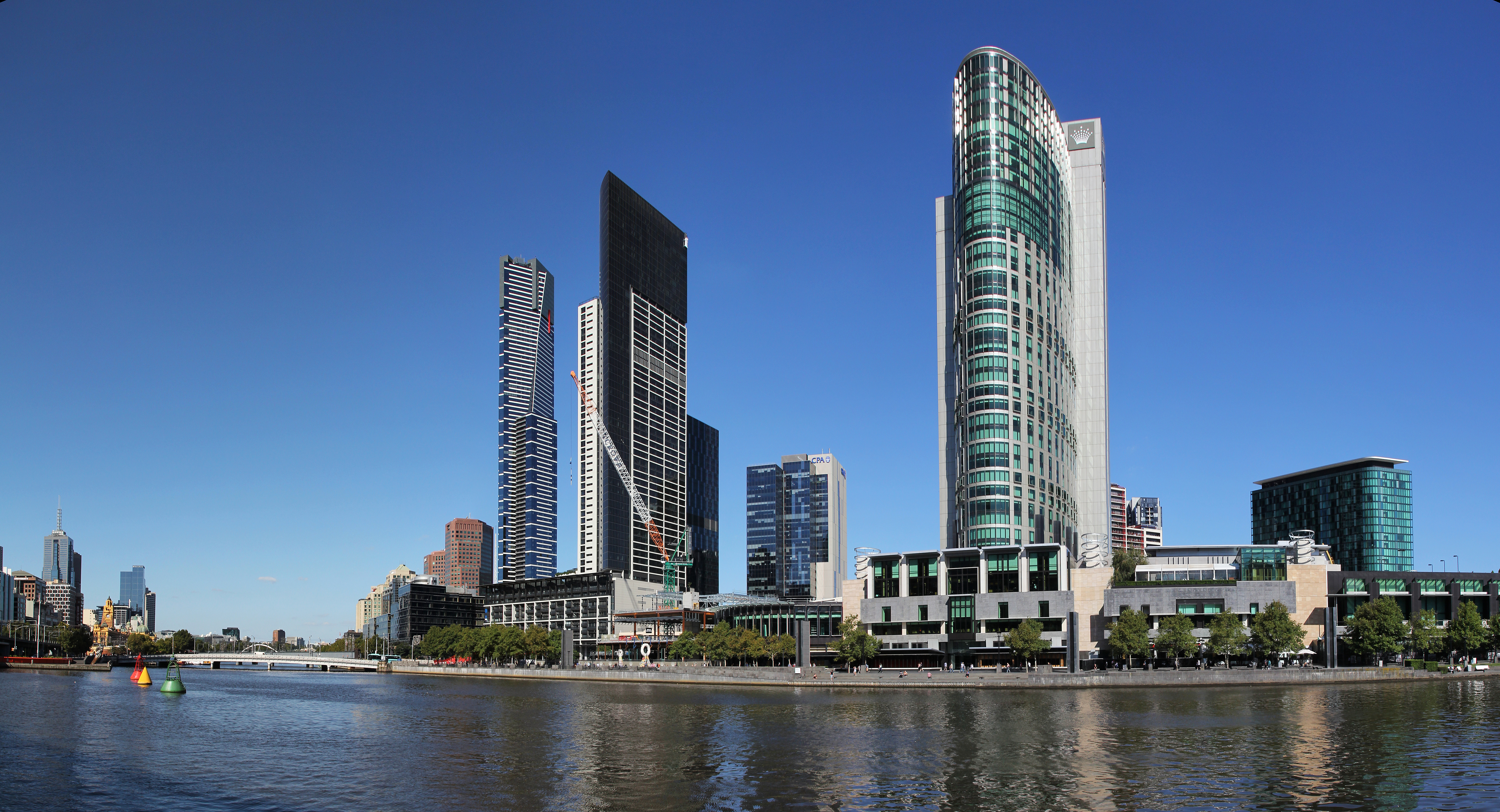
- Crown Casino in 2007, along the Yarra River in Melbourne
- Interactive map of Crown Melbourne
- Location: Southbank, Victoria, Australia; Yarra Promenade
- Opened: 30 June 1994; 32 years ago (temporary location); 8 May 1997; 29 years ago (permanent location)
- No. of rooms: 1,604
- Gaming space: 220,000 sq ft (20,000 m^{2})
- Signature attractions: The Palladium; Seasons of Fortune, Southern Porte Cochere, Revelry, Brigades and Celebration
- Notable restaurants: Nobu; Gradi; Silks; Conservatory; Koko; Bistro Guillaume; Rockpool
- Casino type: Land
- Owner: Crown Resorts
- Architect: Daryl Jackson
- Public transit access: Queens Bridge St (#115): 58 Clarendon St: 12, 96, 109 Bus routes 234, 236, 605
- Website: crownmelbourne.com.au

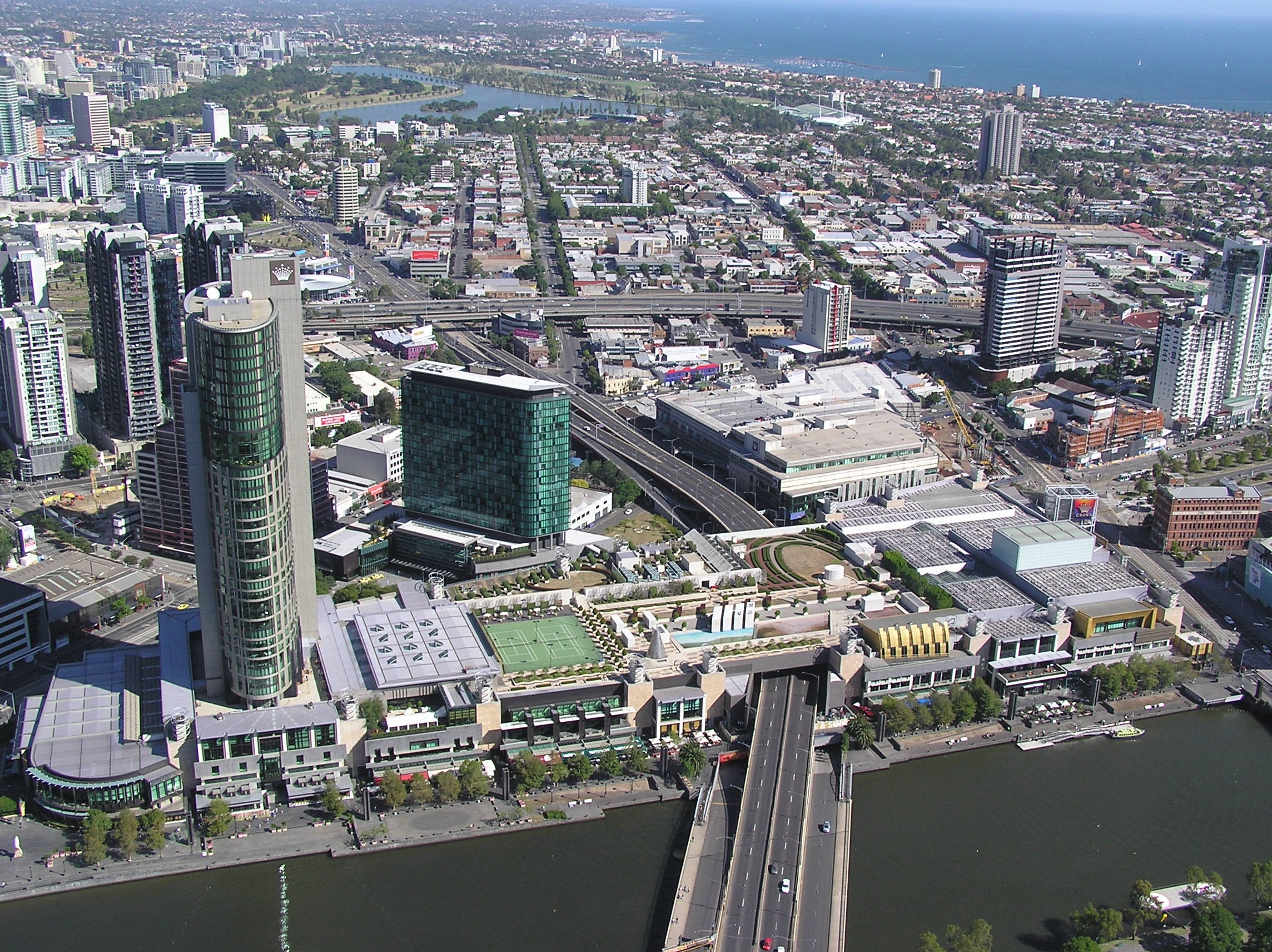
Aerial view of the complex from the north

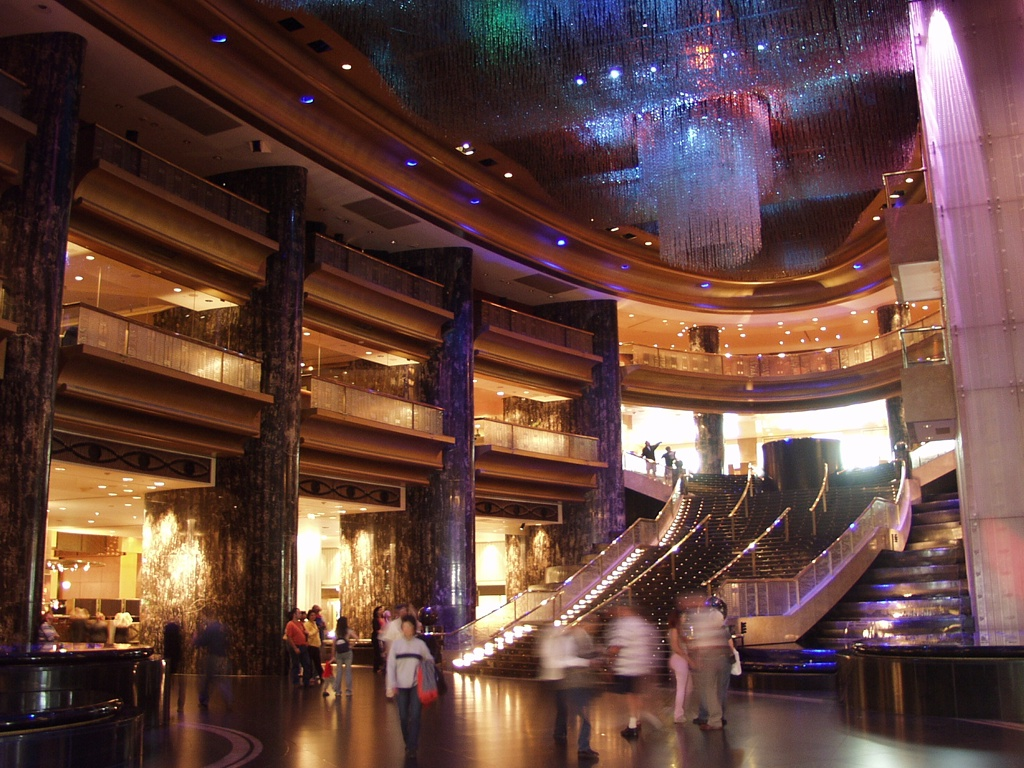
The Atrium at Crown

Crown Melbourne (also referred to as Crown Casino and Entertainment Complex) is an integrated resort consisting of a casino and hotel located on the south bank of the Yarra River, in Melbourne, Australia. Crown Melbourne is a subsidiary of Crown Resorts, and was the first casino of the now-international Crown brand.

Initially having opened in 1994 on the north bank of the Yarra River, Crown Melbourne relocated and re–opened on the south bank of the Yarra, in 1997. It remains one of the central features of the Southbank precinct of the Melbourne central business district. The entire complex has a space of 510,000 m^{2}–equivalent to two city blocks—making it the largest casino complex in the Southern Hemisphere and one of the largest in the world. The complex also hosts three hotels; the Crown Towers, Crown Promenade and Crown Metropol.

It was founded, owned and run by Lloyd Williams until taken over by Publishing & Broadcasting Limited in 1999.

== Opening and statistics ==
=== Temporary location ===
Crown Melbourne opened on 30 June 1994 at the World Trade Centre on the northern bank of the Yarra River. The location served as a temporary setup during construction of the permanent complex.

=== Permanent location ===
Crown's permanent location opened on 8 May 1997 of the southern bank of the Yarra River. It was designed by a team of architects and interior designers working in collaboration, including: Bates Smart, Perrott Lyon Mathieson and Daryl Jackson (in association).

On opening night, actress Rachel Griffiths infamously ran through the casino topless on its opening night to protest the project.

It is one of the central features of the Southbank area in the Melbourne central business district and the Crown Towers fronts onto the waterfront as part of Southbank Promenade. Children under the age of 18 are permitted into the entertainment and shopping section of complex, but not into the gaming area or areas serving alcohol. The entire complex has a space of 510,000 m^{2}, making it the largest casino complex in the Southern Hemisphere and one of the largest in the world.

Crown Casino has a licence for 540 table games (100 poker tables) and 2,500 poker machines.

== Restaurants, bars and retail ==
There are several nightclubs and restaurants as well as "Kingpin" (formerly Galactic Circus), an electronic games arcade, laser tag game, bowling alley, and many luxury brands such as Kennedy.

=== Restaurants ===
- Conservatory
- Koko
- Rockpool Bar and Grill
- Nobu Melbourne
- The Atlantic
- Silks
- Bistro Guillaume

== Hotels ==
Crown has three hotel towers:

- Crown Towers: a skyscraper comprising a five-star luxury hotel located within the Crown Entertainment Complex. It houses 481 rooms and villas over 38 floors. Located on the banks of the Yarra River it overlooks the city centre, Kings Domain, Port Phillip and Docklands.
- Crown Metropol: reputedly Australia's largest hotel by number of rooms. This five-star hotel houses 658 rooms across 28 floors.
- Crown Promenade: a 465-room, 4.5-star hotel on 23 floors. It is located on the block behind Crown Towers and is connected to the main complex by a pedestrian overpass. It also houses Australia's only purpose built hotel conference facility the 'Crown Conference Centre'.

A fourth hotel, One Queensbridge, had plans for its construction approved. However, these plans fell through due to a failure to acquire financing.

=== Notable guests at Crown's hotels ===
Notable guests at the Crown Towers, Crown Metropol and Crown Promenade Hotels have included Celine Dion, Tom Cruise, Katie Holmes, Kim Kardashian, Katy Perry, Nicole Kidman, Rachel Griffiths, One Direction, Keanu Reeves, Kerry Packer, Tiger Woods and many other high-profile celebrities and politicians. Roger Federer, Rafael Nadal, and several other tennis players often stay at the casino during the Australian Open.

== Attractions ==
=== The Palladium Ballroom ===
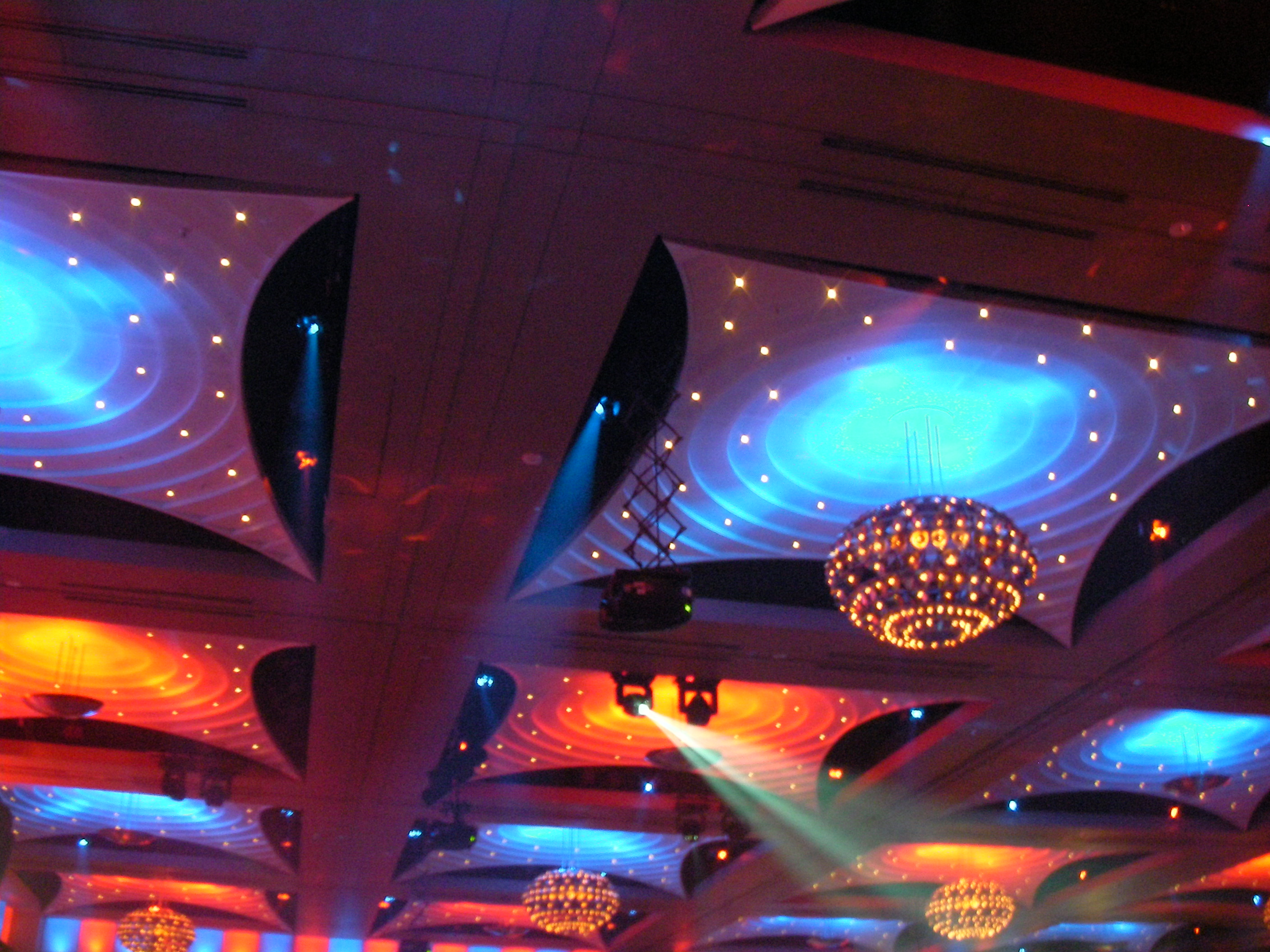
The ornate modern ceiling of the Crown Palladium room

The Palladium at Crown is a ballroom with a seating capacity of 1500. It has played host to some of Australia's premier functions, including the annual Logie Awards, Brownlow Medal, Allan Border Medal, the Australian Formula One Grand Prix ball and the Melbourne Press Club Quill award for excellence in journalism.

=== Water features ===
Water features appear both inside and outside the Crown Casino complex.

=== Gas brigades fire show ===
Along the Yarra River, outside crown, there are eight towers, at night these towers shoot spheres of fire, almost 3 metres in diameter, in the air at choreographed intervals. The show occurs every hour with times of operating depending on the season of the year and do not operate in strong winds or when a total fire ban is declared.

== Controversies ==
=== Criminal activities ===
- In 2009, Crown Casino paid substantial sums to the victims of gambling addict and former mayor of Geelong Frank De Stefano. The casino had knowingly accepted stolen money from him.
- In 2016, eighteen employees of Crown Casino were detained by Chinese police after having been accused of resorting to gambling crimes.
- In June 2022, the Victorian Gambling and Casino Control Commission (VGCCC) stated Crown Melbourne aided in the processing of A$164 million in transactions and earned A$32 million in income from illicit payments. The illicit payments came from Chinese gamblers and the company aided in unlawfully transferring the money out of the country. Due to this the company had been fined A$80 million.
- In November 2022, Crown Melbourne was sanctioned with A$120 million in fines for breaches of responsible gambling legislation which had occurred for over a decade. Some of the breaches Crown was fined for included allowing its patrons to gamble for periods of over 24 hours without taking a break and the failure to stop patrons from using plastic picks to engage in auto-play on Poker Machines. The chair of the VGCCC, Fran Thorn, said that "for a long time, Crown had promoted itself as having the world’s best approach to problem gambling. Nothing could be further from the truth" and that the casino operator "prioritised revenue maximisation over its obligations to protect patrons."

=== The Finkelstein Royal Commission ===
- The Royal Commission into the Casino Operator and Licence heavily criticised crown for a variety of illegal and unethical activities. The commission's findings of Crown include money laundering, strong ties to organised criminal networks, and found other serious problems with Crown's corporate governance among other things. Essentially, the Royal Commission made the recommendation that Crown be put under a two-year review period where they are able to keep their license to operate, but have to make major changes in order to facilitate a legal casino operation and responsible gambling. This includes the appointment of an inspector to monitor and ascertain whether money laundering, loan sharking, or illicit drug sales were taking place and exclude people when necessary.
- The Victorian State Government accepted the recommendations made by the commission and has introduced the Casino and Gambling Legislation Amendment Bill 2021 which appoints a Special Manager to oversee all operations and decision making of Crown, establishes a new regulator known as the Victorian Gambling and Casino Control Commission which has new powers and imposes more obligations on Crown, and bans Junket operations among other things.

=== Thefts ===
- In 2002, Thomas Mangos, a 39-year-old man from Bundoora, stole $136,000 from crown casino's Mahogany Room using a fake gun. Mangos' armed robbery occurred after he was "seduced" by the casino and lost $1 million gambling. He later turned himself into police, was charged, pleaded guilty, and was subsequently sentenced to a 5 years term of imprisonment with a 3-year non-parole period.
- In 2013, a man with access to the video feeds from Crown's security cameras via an accomplice cheated the casino out of $33 million.

=== Other ===
- In September 2015, Rochelle Nolan, the fiancée and de facto wife of entertainer/comedian Russell Gilbert, took her own life after a battle with depression and was found deceased in one of the rooms of the hotel.

== See also ==
- Crown Sydney
- Crown Perth
- List of integrated resorts
