= Betfair Australia =

Australian gambling company

- Type: Subsidiary
- Industry: Gambling
- Founded: 2004
- Headquarters: Melbourne, Australia
- Key people: Amy Zavros (CEO)
- Products: Betting exchange, sports betting, online casino, online poker, online bingo
- Owner: Crown Resorts
- Website: betfair.com.au

Betfair Australia is a gambling company founded in 2004. It operates the largest online betting exchange in Oceania. Its product offering also includes sports betting, online casino, online poker, and online bingo. Business operations are led from its headquarters in Melbourne. In August 2014, Betfair Australia was acquired by Crown Resorts for AU$20m.

== History ==
Betfair UK was founded in 2000 by Andrew Black and Edward Wray. In 2004 Betfair signed a joint venture agreement with Australia's Publishing and Broadcasting Limited to start the Australian exchange. Betfair was awarded a non-exclusive licence by the Tasmanian Gaming Commission in February 2006 to conduct Australia's first betting exchange. Later that year Betfair Australia's market operations team managed its first market and shortly after the first telephone betting calls were taken by Betfair Australia staff.

== Operations ==
In November 2005 the Government of Tasmania announced a deal to license Betfair in Tasmania. It was the second licence awarded to Betfair outside the UK – the first being in Malta with subsequent licences following in Austria and Germany – and Tasmania now receives substantial tax revenues.

In August 2006 the first bet is matched on the Australian exchange. There have since been more than 350 million bets placed and more than two million calls have been taken. Around 400,000 unique markets have been settled.

A ban on the use of betting exchanges took effect in Western Australia on 29 January 2007, with Betfair successfully claiming this new law violated the Constitution of Australia.

In a unanimous verdict by the High Court of Australia on 27 March 2008, the two provisions of the legislation, purporting to ban Western Australians from using a betting exchange and prohibiting an unauthorised business from using Western Australian race lists, were declared invalid as they applied to Betfair. The provisions were characterised as imposing a burden on interstate trade that was protectionist in nature, and therefore contravened section 92 of the Commonwealth Constitution.

However, in the 2012 High Court case of Betfair Pty Limited v Racing New South Wales, Betfair's appeal, against a newly enacted fee to access New South Welsh vital race field information, was rejected. The Court held that the relevant law would have no discriminatory or protectionist effect on interstate trade, thereby complying with section 92 of the Constitution of Australia, and that Betfair had not proven that the fee would cause significant economic damage (not to the extent of the appellants in Castlemaine Tooheys Ltd v South Australia).

In August 2014 Betfair completed the sale of their 50% stake in Betfair Australia to venture partner Crown Resorts, one of Australia's largest gaming and entertainment groups. The stake was valued at £5.5m. In 2008 it was calculated that Betfair handle more transactions than all of Europe's stock exchanges combined – an average of 5 million a day, 99.9% are successfully completed in under one second. Betfair Australia set a world record for most money traded in a single market in March 2015 when $184,383,446 was matched in-play for the 2015 ICC Cricket World Cup semi-final between South Africa and New Zealand. In a see-sawing match favouritism changed 31 times throughout the game with South Africa trading at $1.58 in the last over and then going on to lose with $8.58mil matched on them at less than $1.35.
