= Betfair Pty Limited v Western Australia =

Judgement of the High Court of Australia

Betfair v WA
- Court: High Court of Australia
- Full case name: Betfair Pty Limited v Western Australia
- Decided: 27 March 2008
- Citations: [2008] HCA 11, (2008) 234 CLR 418; 244 ALR 32

Court membership
- Judges sitting: Gleeson CJ, Gummow, Kirby, Hayne, Heydon, Crennan and Kiefel JJ

Case opinions
- (7:0) The 2007 amendments to Betting Control Act 1954 (WA) which prevented interstate betting exchange operators from conducting business in Western Australia were invalid under s 92 of the Australian Constitution

Betfair Pty Limited v Western Australia determined that the series of amendments made by the Western Australian government to prohibit the operation of betting exchanges, amounted to the discriminatory burdens of a protectionist kind.

== Background ==
The first plaintiff, Betfair Pty Ltd, operated a national betting exchange licensed in Tasmania and operated legally under Tasmanian law. Betfair’s exchange operated similarly to that of typical betting exchanges: Betfair would match the wagers of ‘registered players’ betting on opposing outcomes of sporting events either by telephone or through an online exchange, and then take a commission of the winner’s payout.

The amended Act placed three restrictions on the plaintiffs. Firstly, under the newly inserted s 27B(1) it would be illegal for Betfair, the first plaintiff (the ‘out-of-state supply’), to operate a betting exchange in Western Australia. Secondly, under the newly inserted s 24(1)aa of the Act, it would be illegal for residents of Western Australia, such as Mr. Erceg, the second plaintiff (the ‘in-state demand’ ), to place a wager through a betting exchange. Furthermore, under the newly inserted ss 27C and 27D of the Act, it would be also illegal to publish the race fields of Western Australian races without ministerial approval.

These new provisions of the Betting Control Act 1954 (WA) effectively prevented Betfair from participating in the Western Australian ‘wagering market’, a market dominated by Western Australian bookmakers and totalisators. Betfair argued that these amendments, namely ss 24(1aa) and 27D were invalid under s 92 of Constitution, as the amendments imposed ‘discriminatory burdens of a protectionist kind’. Section 24(1aa) prevented Betfair from competing for telephone and online gamblers. Betfair was the only betting operator out of 115 which did not receive ministerial approval under Section 27D, and was therefore prevented from publishing the fields of Western Australian races.

The defendants submitted that these provisions, although discriminatory, were not used for the purpose of protectionism but rather for legitimate non-protectionist purposes. In addition to threatening an industry where Betfair made no contribution, the introduction of a betting exchange, where it was possible to ‘back to lose’, presented a risk that users may attempt to influence the outcome of a race and threaten the integrity of the racing industry.

== Decision ==
The High Court held unanimously that the Western Australian government did indeed establish discriminatory burdens of a protectionist kind, and declared the amendments invalid under Section 92 of the Constitution of Australia. Notably, the judgement distinguished the court's approach to proportionality under the Cole test, arguing that trade-restrictive legislation must be 'reasonably necessary', not justified merely in balancing out a social or economic detriment.

== See also ==
- Australian constitutional law
- Oreb, 'Betting Across Borders: Betfair Pty Ltd v Western - Case Note' (2009) 31 Sydney Law Review 607.
