= Mikimoto =

Mikimoto (written: 幹本, 美樹本 or 御木本) is a Japanese surname. Notable people with the surname include:

- Kokichi Mikimoto (御木本 幸吉, 1858–1954), Japanese businessman and creator of the first cultured pearl
- Haruhiko Mikimoto (美樹本 晴彦, born 1959), Japanese manga artist, character designer and illustrator
- Shinsuke Mikimoto (御木本 伸介, 1931–2002), Japanese actor
- Yūji Mikimoto (幹本 雄之, born 1948), Japanese voice actor
