= Crown Sydney =

Skyscraper in Barangaroo, New South Wales, Australia

- Crown Sydney, May 2023
- Alternative names: One Barangaroo

Record height
- Tallest in Sydney since 2020^{[I]}
- Preceded by: Chifley Tower

General information
- Status: Completed
- Type: Mixed use
- Location: Barangaroo, Sydney Australia, 1–11 Barangaroo Avenue
- Coordinates: 33.862469°S 151.201160°E
- Construction started: October 2016
- Topped-out: March 2020
- Completed: December 2020
- Opened: 28 December 2020
- Cost: A$2.2 billion
- Owner: Crown Resorts

Height
- Tip: 271.3 metres (890 ft)
- Observatory: 250 metres (820 feet)

Technical details
- Floor count: 75 (71 above ground) (4 below ground)
- Floor area: 146,500 m^{2} (1,577,000 sq ft)
- Lifts/elevators: 10

Design and construction
- Architecture firm: WilkinsonEyre
- Developer: Crown Resorts
- Structural engineer: Robert Bird Group
- Services engineer: LCI
- Main contractor: Lendlease
- Casino information
- No. of rooms: 349 (hotel); 82 (apartments)
- Casino type: Land-based
- Owner: Crown Resorts
- Operating license holder: Crown Resorts
- Website: www.crownsydney.com.au

Crown Sydney (also referred to by its street address of One Barangaroo and informally known as Packer’s Pecker) is a skyscraper in Barangaroo, New South Wales, Australia. Designed by WilkinsonEyre, it stands at a height of 271.3 m (890 ft) with 75 floors, making it the tallest building in Sydney and 4th tallest in Australia. It was developed by Crown Resorts, primarily comprising a hotel and residential apartments, while a casino and other hospitality venues make up the rest of its floorspace. Construction began in October 2016, and the building was topped out in March 2020. It was inaugurated to the public in December 2020.

Crown Sydney is a major component of the urban redevelopment of the Barangaroo area of central Sydney, forming part of a cluster of skyscrapers comprising the adjacent One Sydney Harbour and International Towers. The tower sits on the site of former industrial wharves, which were progressively paved over through land reclamation in the 1960s and 70s after falling into disuse, forming the unoccupied concrete site on which the tower was constructed.

== Background ==
=== Early proposals ===
Initial concepts for a hotel development in Barangaroo as part of its urban redevelopment plan first circulated in 2010. These concepts mostly centred around a 213 metres (699 feet) tall hotel tower built on a pier extended 150 metres (490 feet) into the harbour. Following public backlash, the height of the tower was lowered to 159 metres (522 feet) and the length of the pier was reduced to 85 metres (279 feet). These proposals failed to gain traction.

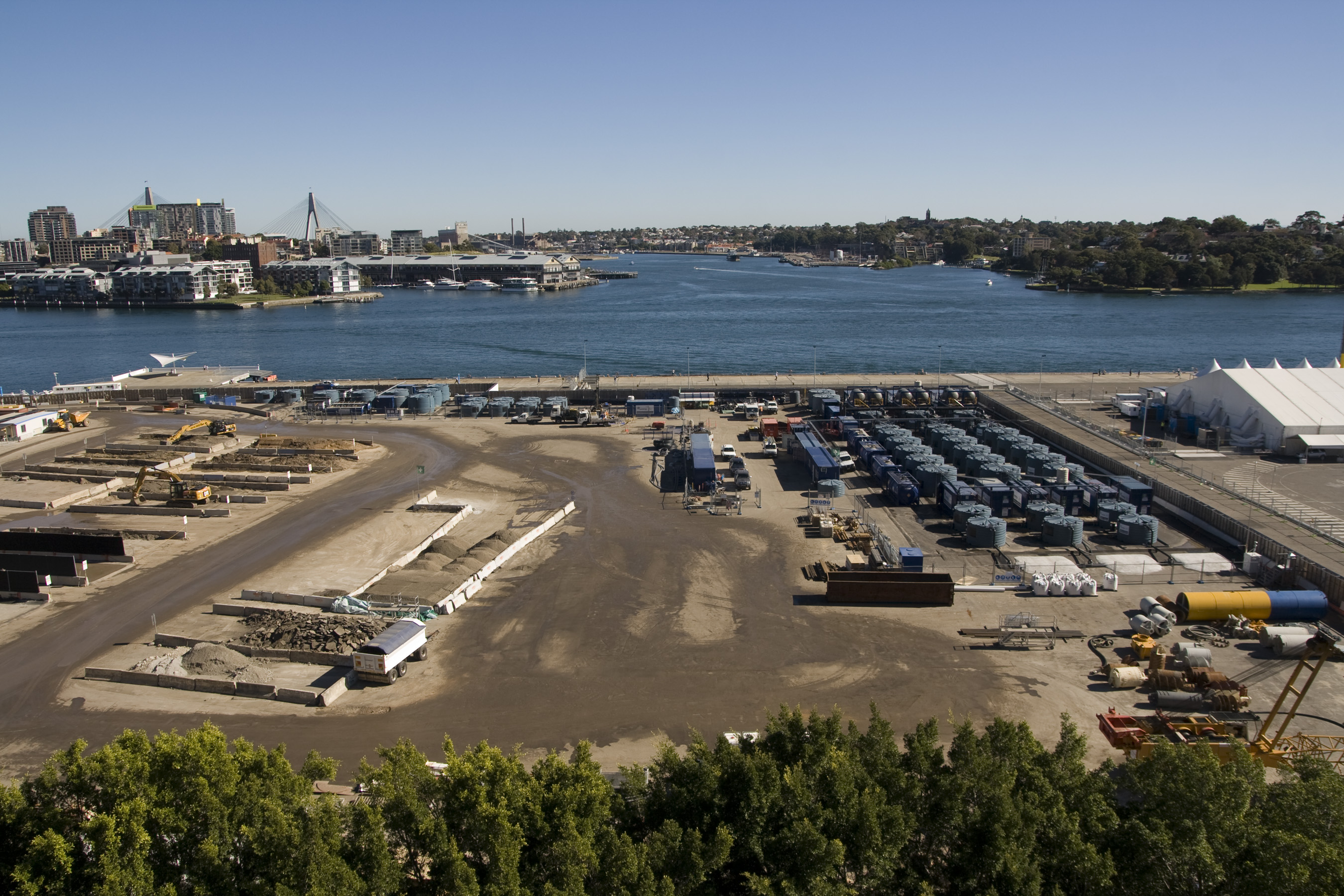
The undeveloped site in 2012

In February 2012, James Packer's casino group, Crown Resorts, presented an A$1 billion+ proposal to Premier Barry O'Farrell to build a hotel, casino and entertainment complex at the site on land that was set aside for open space at Barangaroo Central, a departure from previous concepts of building a tower on an extended pier in the harbour. O'Farrell initially welcomed the proposal, yet cautioned it would need to gain regulatory approval before going ahead.

The proposal drew widespread criticism from the Lord Mayor Clover Moore, Paul Keating, and former government architect, Chris Johnson. In October 2012, Premier O'Farrell announced that the NSW Cabinet had reviewed the proposal and decided that the government would enter into detailed negotiations with Crown Resorts for the establishment of a casino and hotel complex at Barangaroo. Tony Harris, a former Auditor-General of New South Wales was critical of the decision−making process, claiming the public could miss out on millions of dollars. Packer wrote a defence of his proposal for the press.

In July 2013 after a recommendation from an independent steering committee, O'Farrell announced the Crown proposal would be moved to Stage 3 of the unsolicited proposals process, the final stage where the parties will negotiate a binding contract. The government received a $100 million upfront fee for the licence, despite being offered $250 million with alternative tax arrangements which the steering committee's economic advisor Deloitte calculated was a superior offer. Crown's intention was to lure Chinese high-rollers to its Sydney casino, leveraging off its interests in its Macau casinos and taking advantage of a new streamlined visa process introduced by the Australian government for Chinese citizens wanting to gamble at Australian casinos. In November 2013, it was announced that Crown Sydney had received approval for the casino licence and place at Barangaroo.

=== Approval ===
In November 2015, Packer expressed his frustrations over the delaying of the project from strenuous government planning laws. Following this in March 2016, a series of proposals to change aspects of the building were recommended by the State Government in order for the project to receive final approval. This included the introduction of a new recess in the interior as well as new cladding on the south side of the building. An observation deck on the 66th floor from a height of 250 metres (820 feet) above ground, as well as public access to the upper floors, was also proposed. In June 2016, the casino received final approval from the Planning Assessment Commission on condition that the casino met needs proposed by the commission, including adequate public spaces and access.

=== Controversies ===
Despite the development's approval, the Millers Point Fund lodged legal action against the project in early August 2016 challenging the validity of the casino and aiming to have construction on the project halted. Crown Resorts responded, stating they would "vigorously defend" their actions. The dispute was held in the Land and Environment Court of New South Wales in late August, with a decisive dismissal of the Millers Point Fund's claims.

On 21 January 2020, the Independent Liquor and Gaming Authority (ILGA) established an inquiry, presided over by Supreme Court of NSW judge Patricia Bergin, into the suitability of Crown entities to operate the Crown Sydney Casino. After Crown Resorts made admissions to the inquiry on 17 November 2020 of money laundering having occurred through some of its VIP accounts at Crown venues in other states, ILGA banned Crown Resorts from opening the Crown Sydney casino in December 2020 as had been planned. Despite the inability of the casino to open, other operations within the Crown Sydney building were unaffected.

On 1 February 2021, Bergin reported the findings of the inquiry to ILGA, including findings that Crown was unsuitable to hold a licence to operate the Crown Sydney Casino. In February 2022, Crown Resorts accepted a A$8.9 billion takeover offer from US private equity firm Blackstone. The deal was approved by the Federal Court of Australia in June 2022 and Crown was delisted from the Australian Securities Exchange.

Following a complete overhaul of Crown Resort's board, management and procedures, a conditional licence was finally granted for the casino in June 2022, allowing for its opening in August 2022.

On 23 April 2024, the NSW Independent Casino Commission reinstated Crown Sydney's unconditional casino licence.

== Construction ==
The development was overseen by Todd Nisbet, Crown's executive vice-president of strategy and development, Lendlease was contracted for the main construction of the structure, while the Robert Bird Group oversaw structural engineering and LCI as head of MEP servicing. Initial site works commenced in October 2016, starting with an excavation and decontamination of the site, mostly of remnants of asbestos; indicative of the site's industrial history. Excavation of the basement and foundation works would continue throughout 2017. Between February and March 2018, tower cranes were assembled on site, to commence works on the main core and floorplates, which would see the structure start to rise throughout 2018. A top-down method of construction was utilised on the core.

By March 2019, the structure had reached a height of 120 metres (390 feet). The structure continued to rise throughout 2019, reaching a "halfway point" in its construction by May 2019, which would be followed closely by the installation of approximately 7000 triangular glass panels for the facade of the building. The main core of the structure topped-out in March 2020, followed by the floorplates which topped out and reached the building's full architectural height in May 2020. Fit-out of the internals of the building and facade continued throughout 2020, before completion was reached in December 2020. Crown Sydney was officially inaugurated to the public on 28 December 2020.

=== Gallery ===
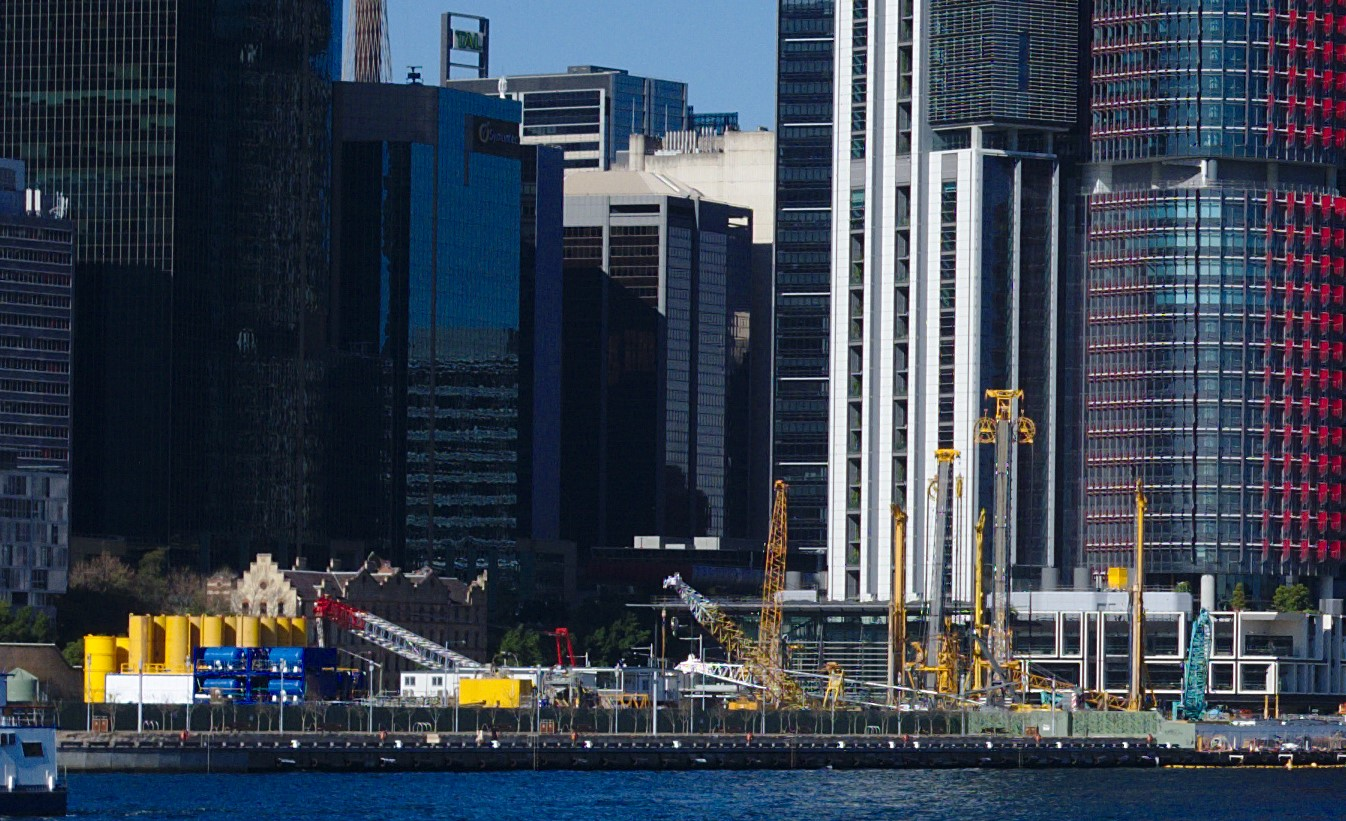
July 2017

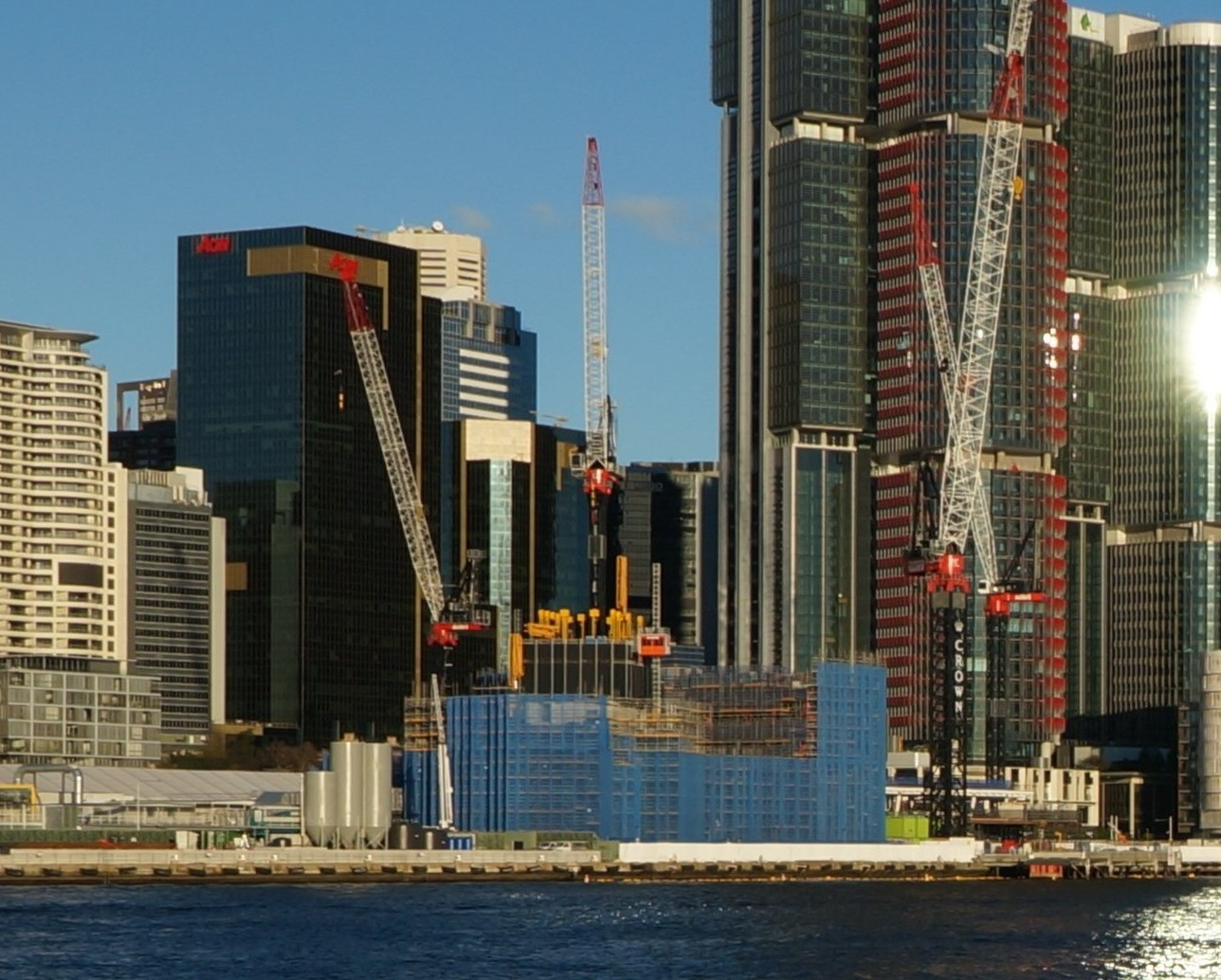
June 2018

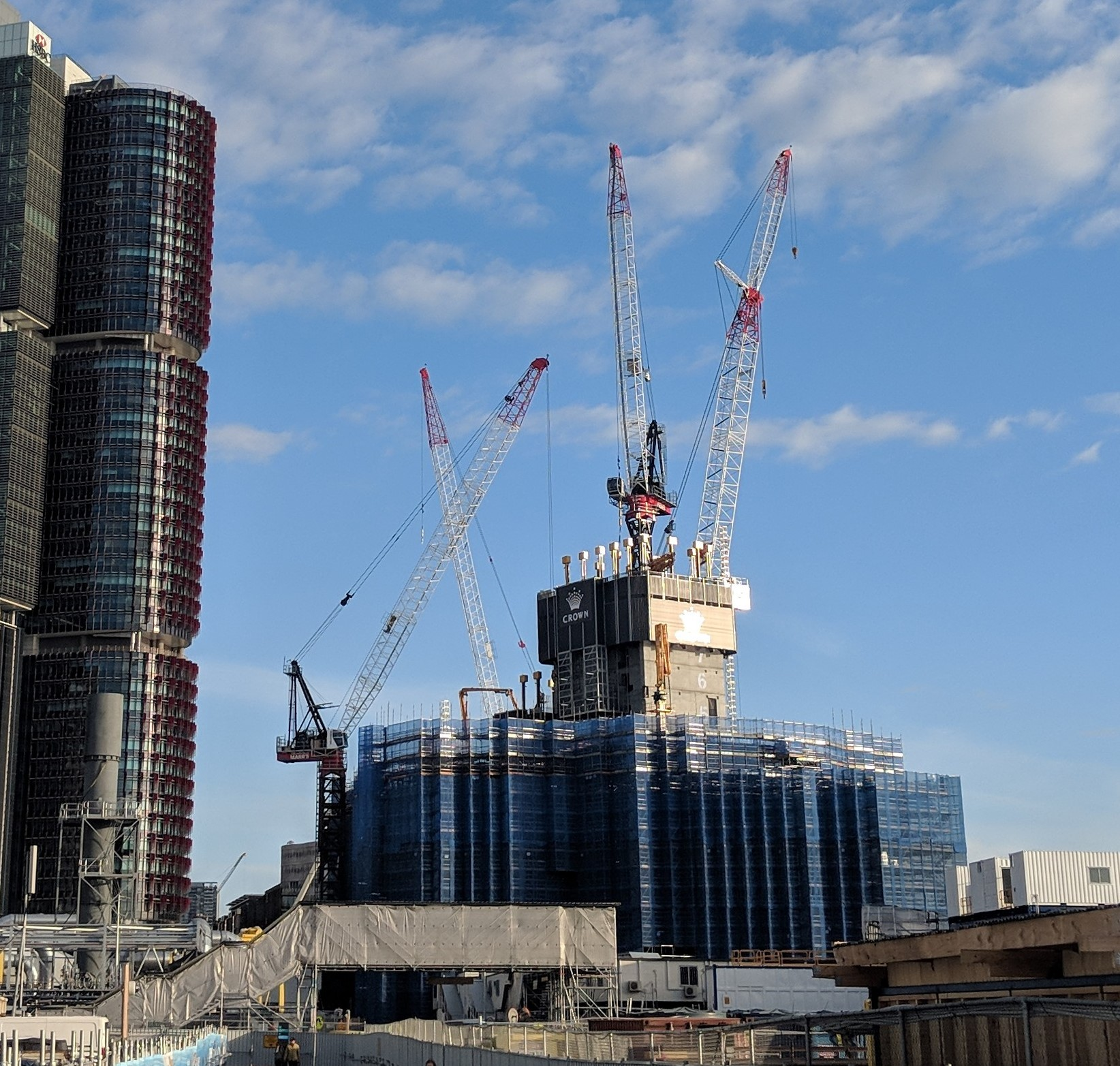
August 2018

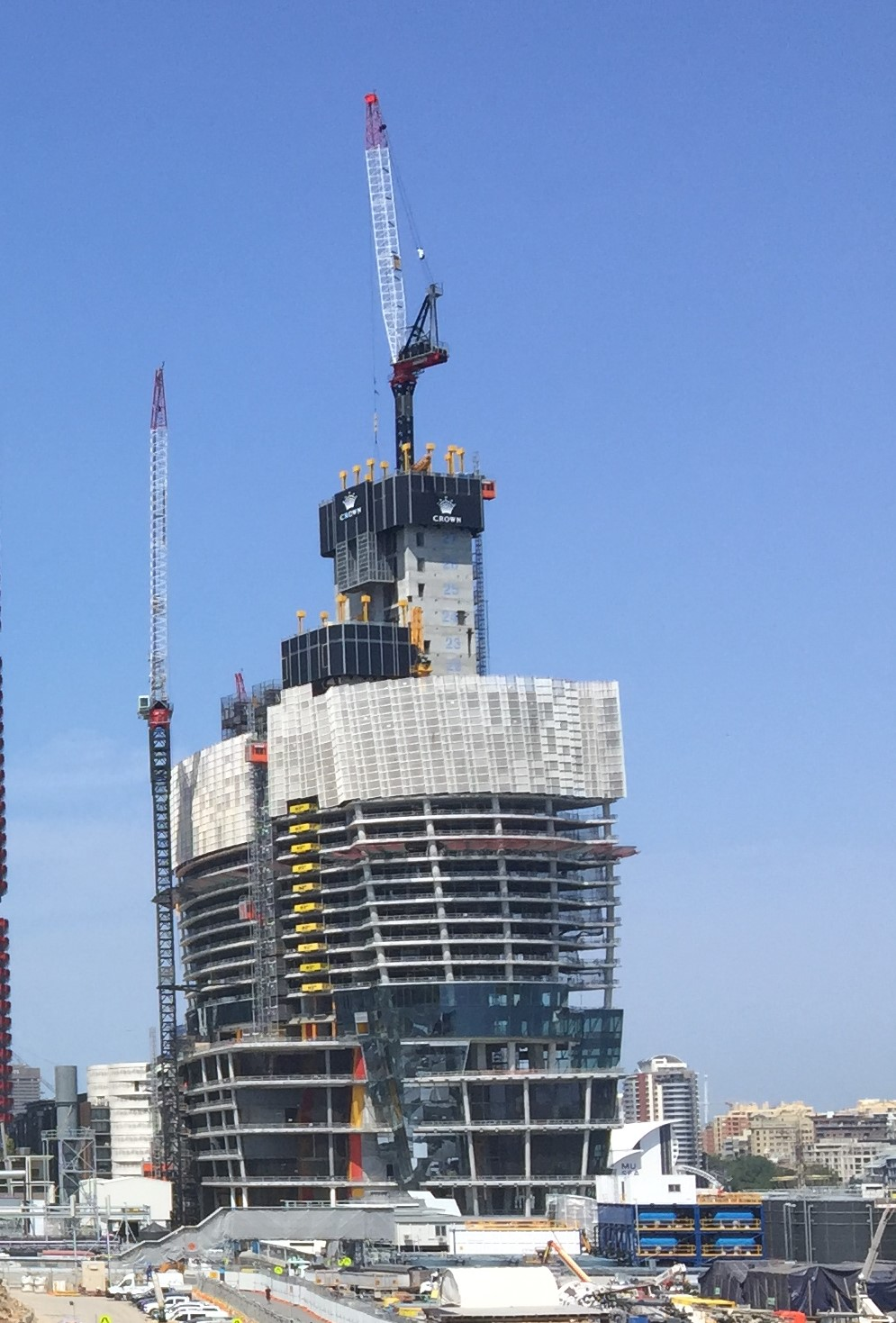
March 2019

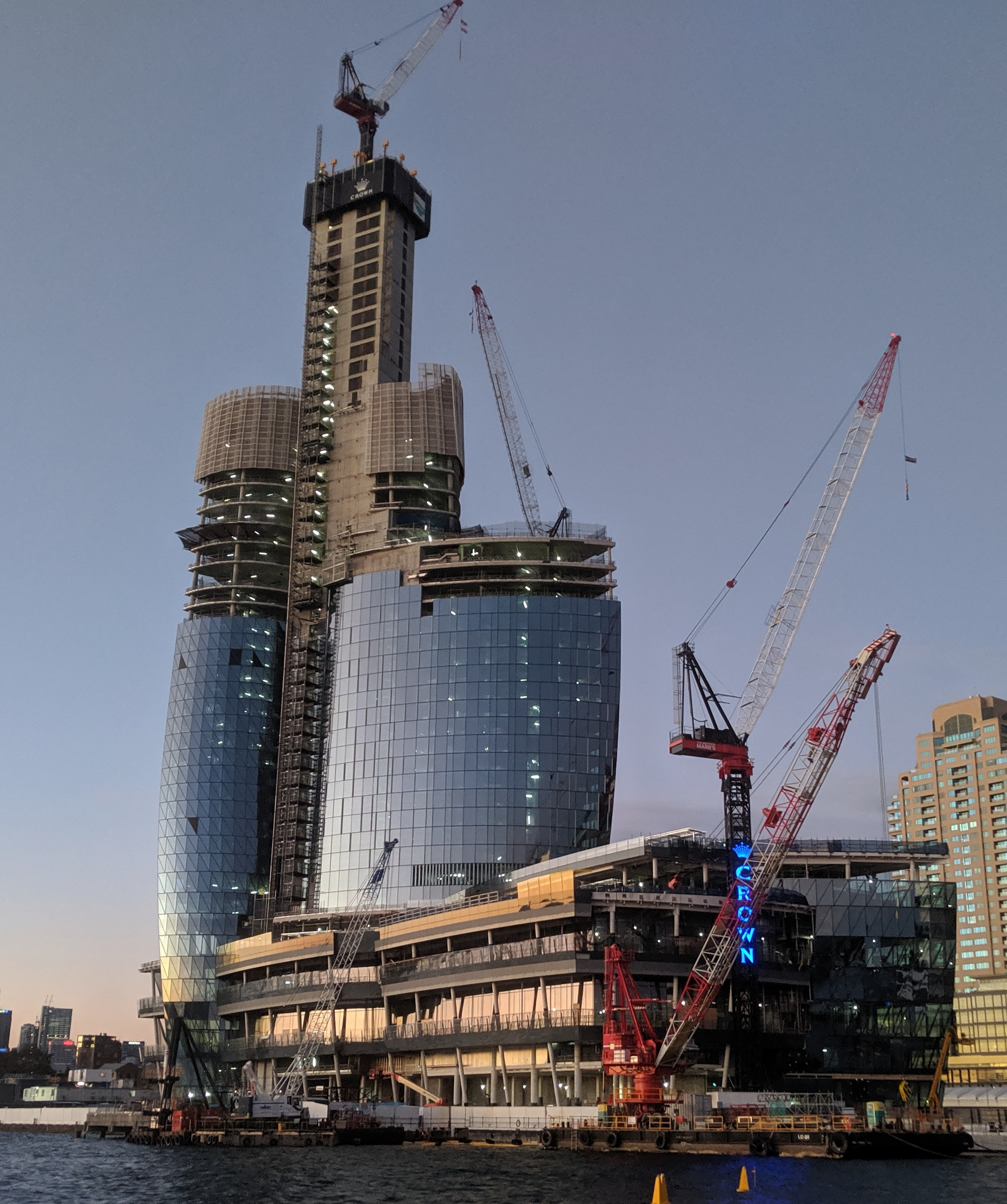
July 2019

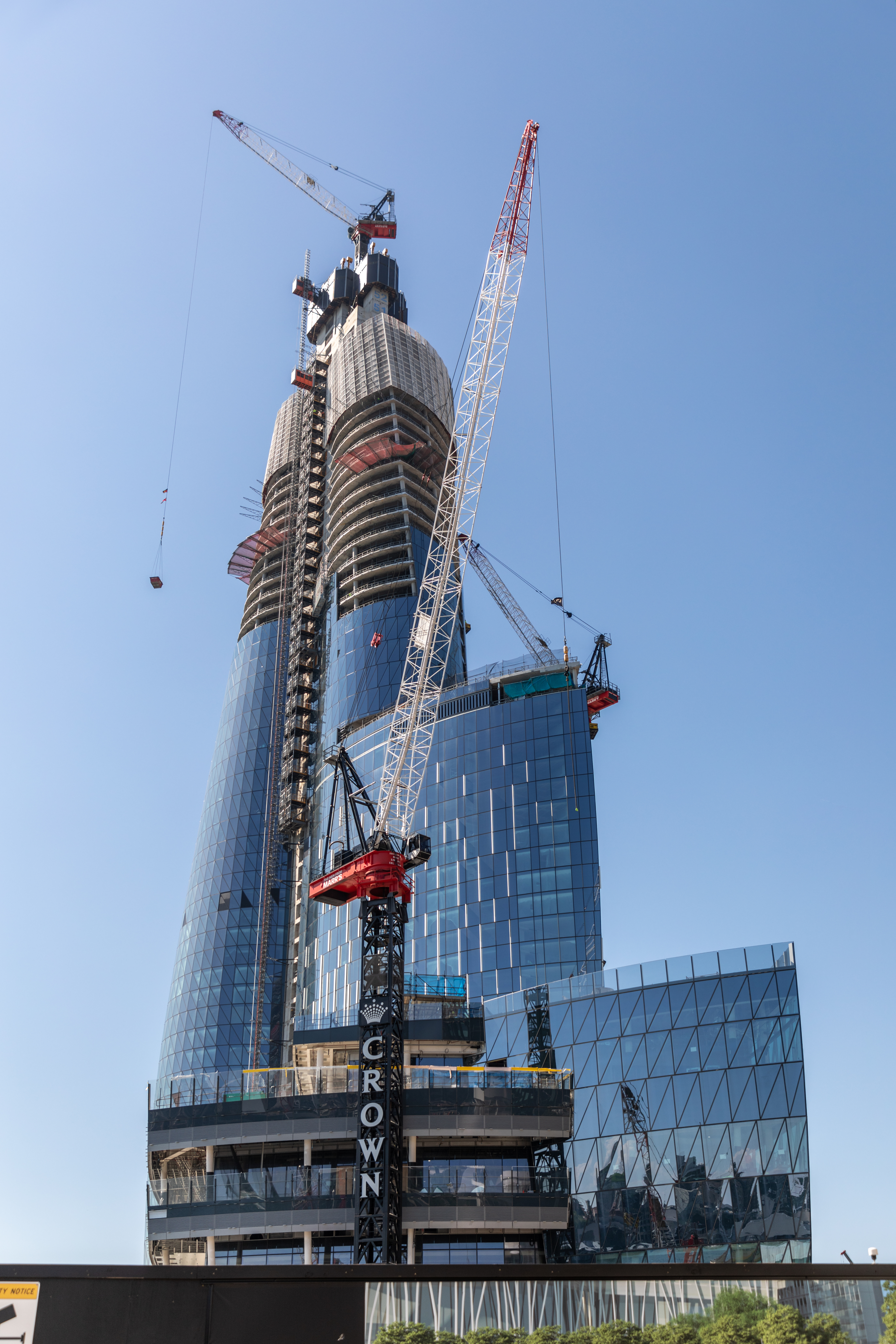
October 2019

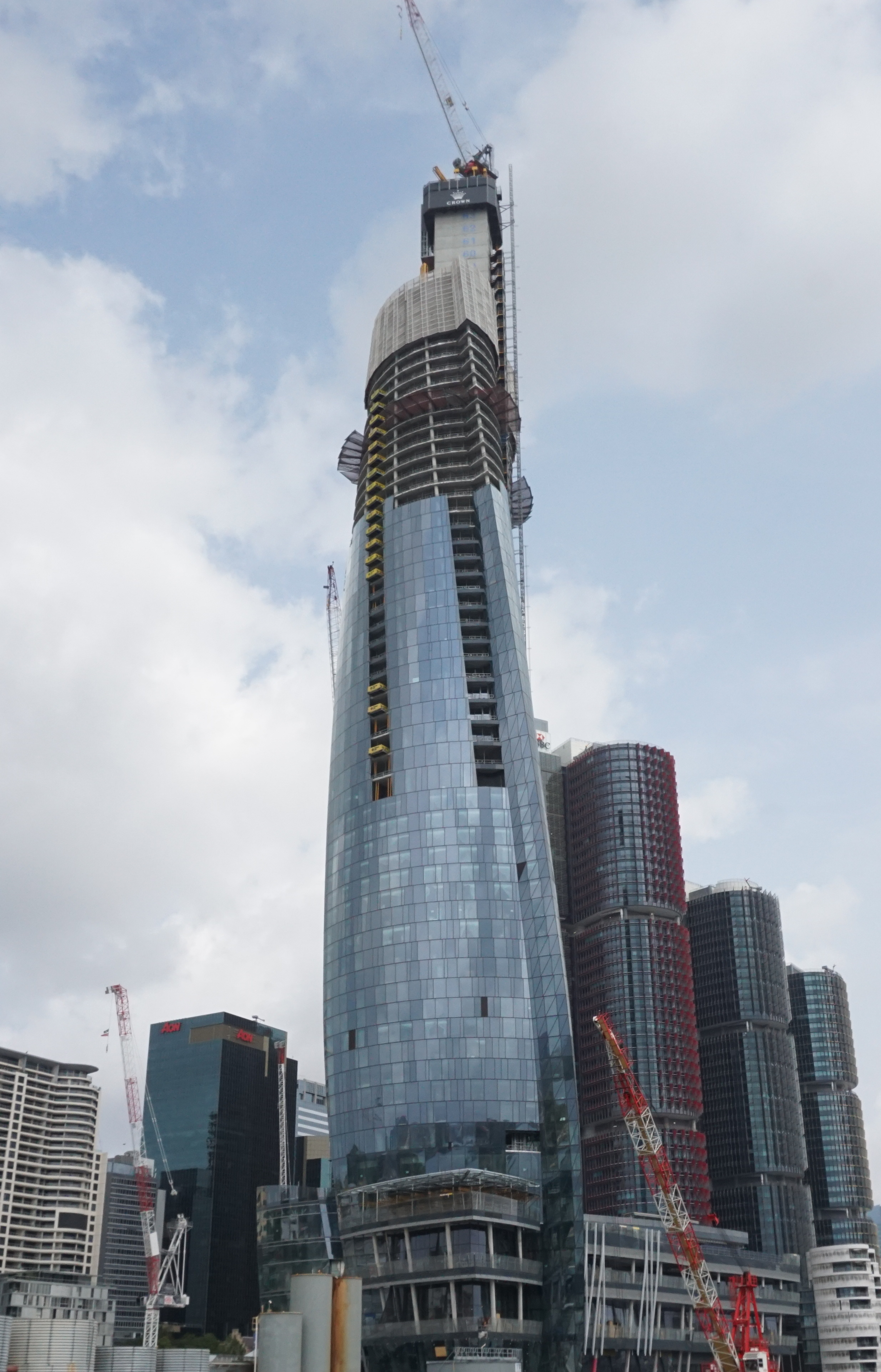
December 2019

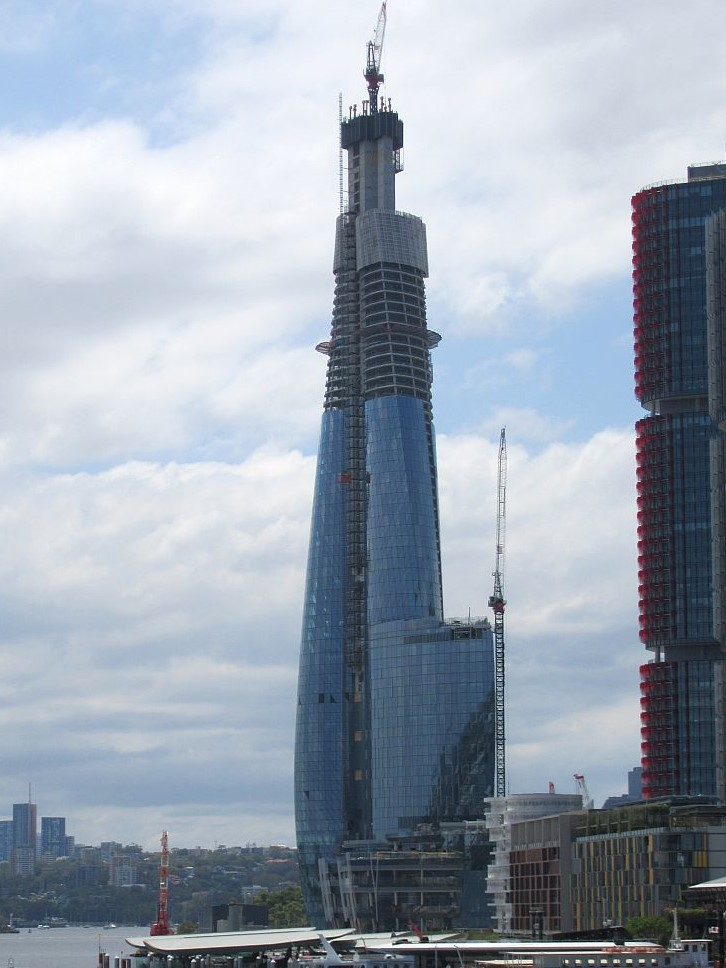
February 2020

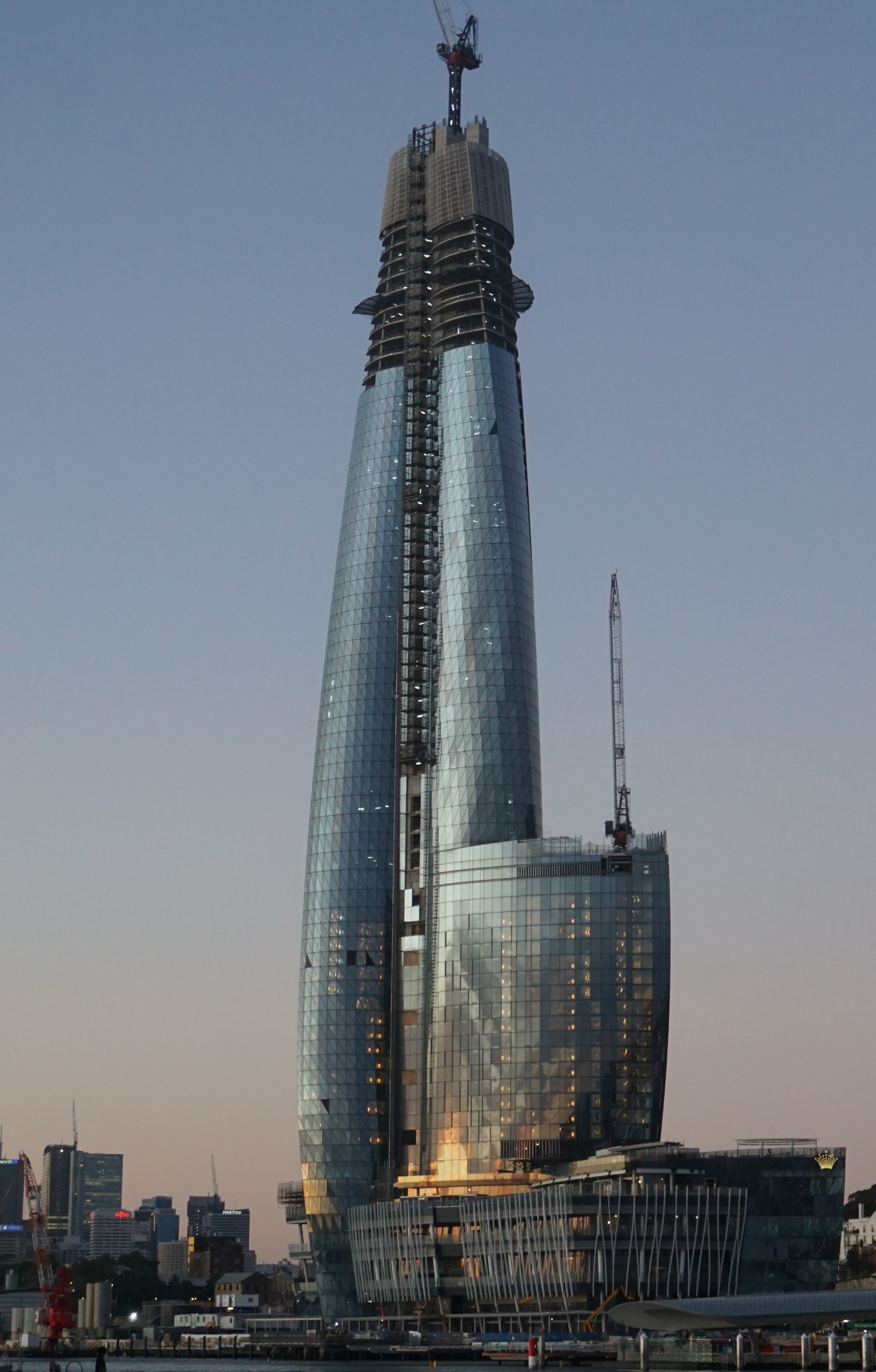
April 2020

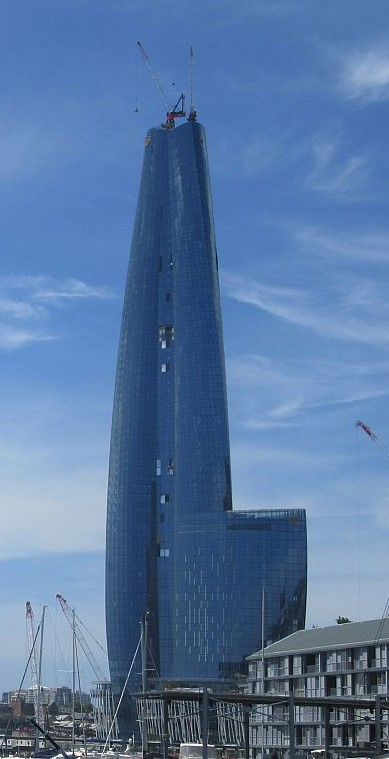
November 2020

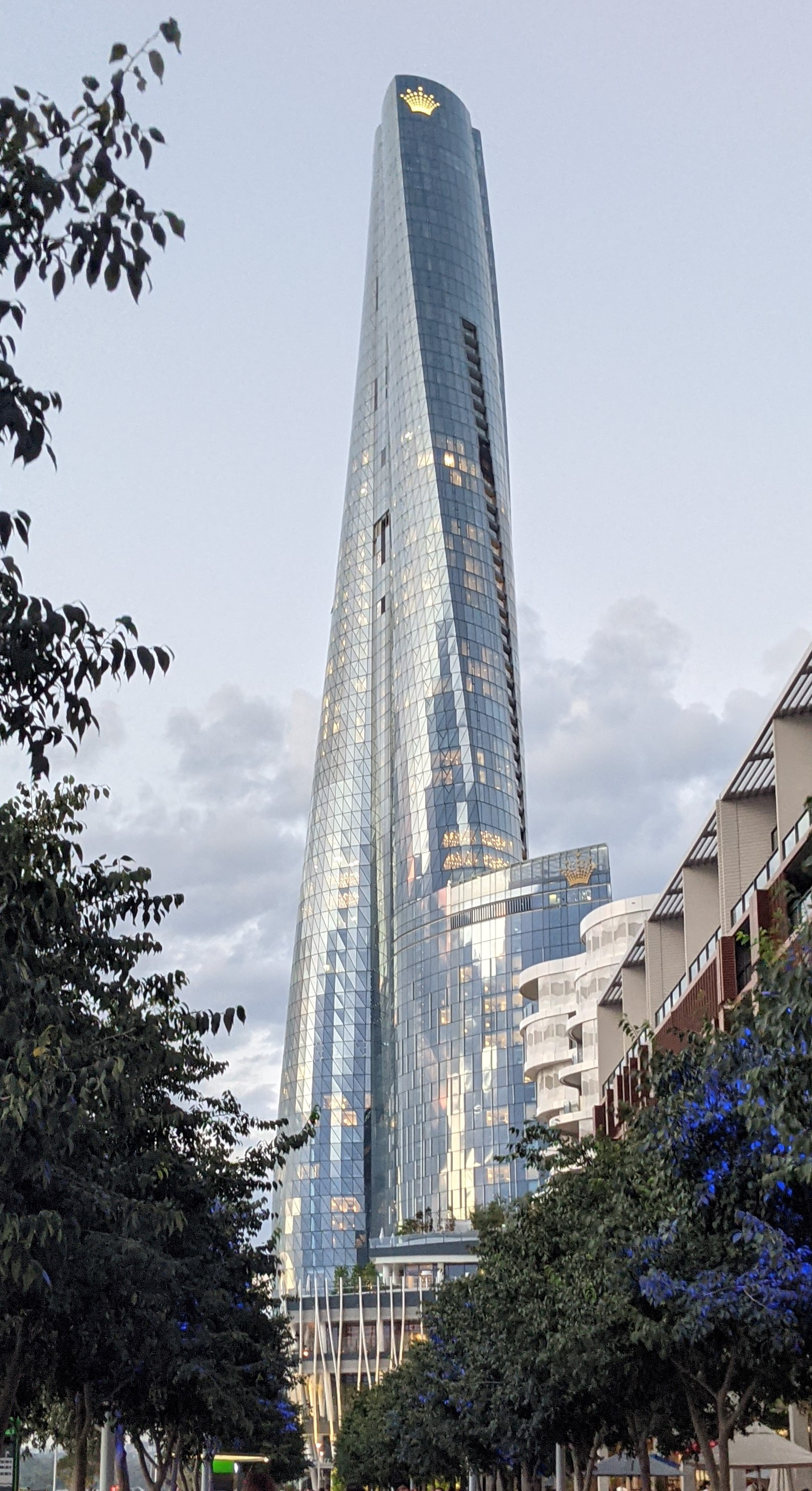
January 2021 (completion)

== Design and layout ==
In 2013, Crown Resorts launched a design competition, seeking expressions of interest from eight architecture firms with experience in similar hospitality focused projects. A shortlist of designs from Adrian Smith + Gordon Gill, Kohn Pedersen Fox and WilkinsonEyre were subsequently selected and a jury panel was formed to select the hotel's final design and Principal Architect. The jury panel consisted of representatives from Crown Resorts, Lendlease and the Barangaroo Delivery Authority as well as a prominent architect representing the NSW Department of Planning and an observer from the City of Sydney. A unanimous vote in favour of Wilkinson Eyre's design was finalised in May 2013.

The design and form of the tower takes inspiration from natural forms and curved geometry, emanating from three "petals" that twist and rise together, The geometry of the tower was derived using parametric 3D modelling, to accommodate a 60-degree twist in the outer skin with helical columns on the perimeter while maintaining a vertical core structure. According to Wilkinson Eyre, the tower "is derived from a sculptural form that is reminiscent of three twisting petals and takes inspiration from nature, being composed of organic forms without literal or direct reference". Additionally, the twisting shape of the upper and intermediate levels of the tower are designed to maximise views of the Harbour Bridge and the Opera House. Founding architect Chris Wilkinson further describes the design of the tower as "a sculptural form that will rise up on the skyline like an inhabited artwork, with differing levels of transparency, striking a clear new image against the sky".

Crown Sydney comprises a floor area of 146,500 m^{2} (1,577,000 sq ft). The casino floor along with bars, restaurants and other hospitality venues occupy the podium of the tower. Crown Resort's six star hotel makes up the lower levels of the tower from levels 6 to 32, including the protruding lower south east wing of the building. Private residential apartments occupy levels 33 to 63 of the tower, while duplex penthouses occupy levels 64 to 66. A public observation deck occupies a small section of level 66. The tower is topped with the hotel's "sky villas", occupying levels 67 to 69, with utilities making up the remaining levels of 70 and 71.

== Gallery ==
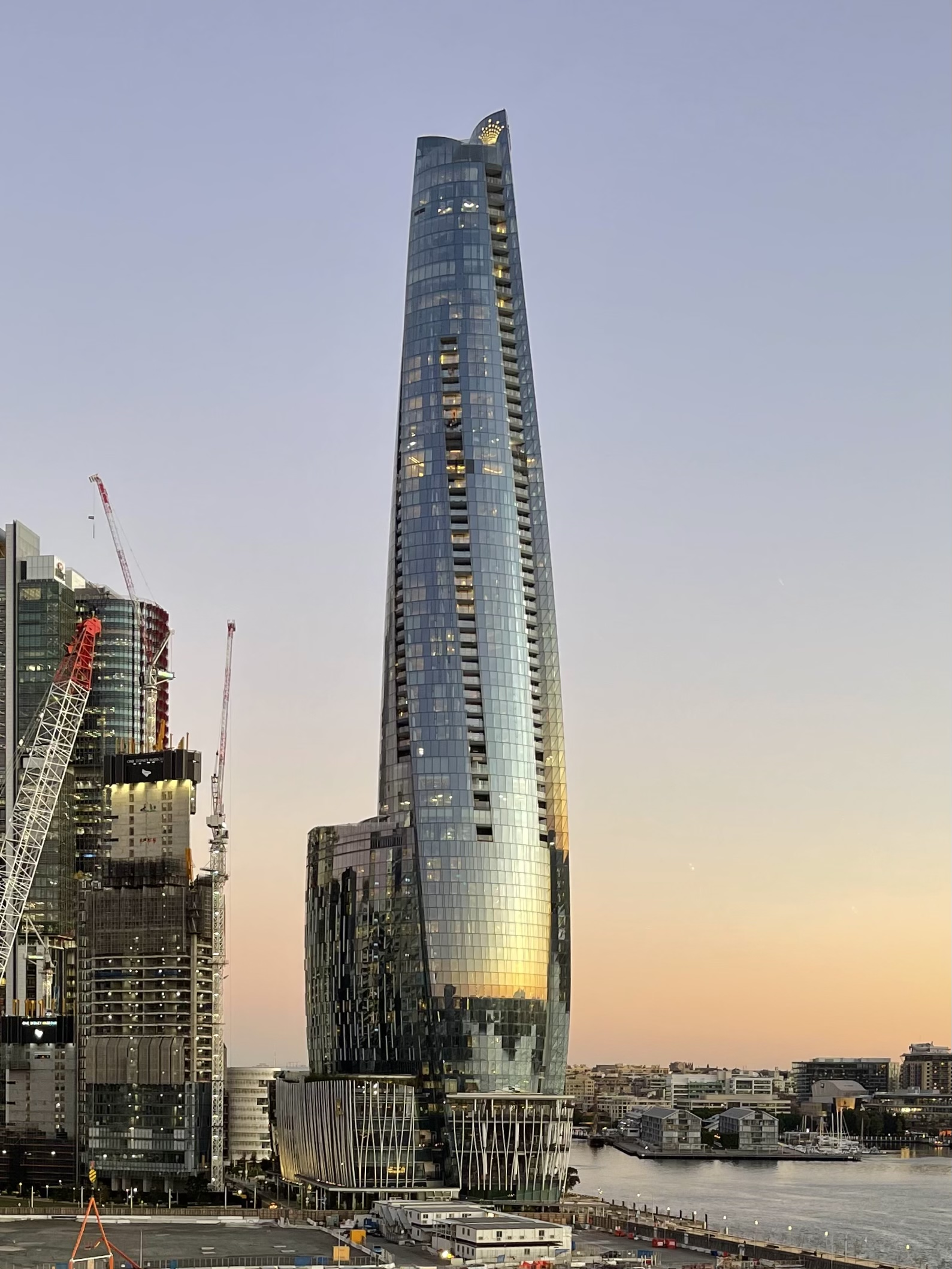
Northern view

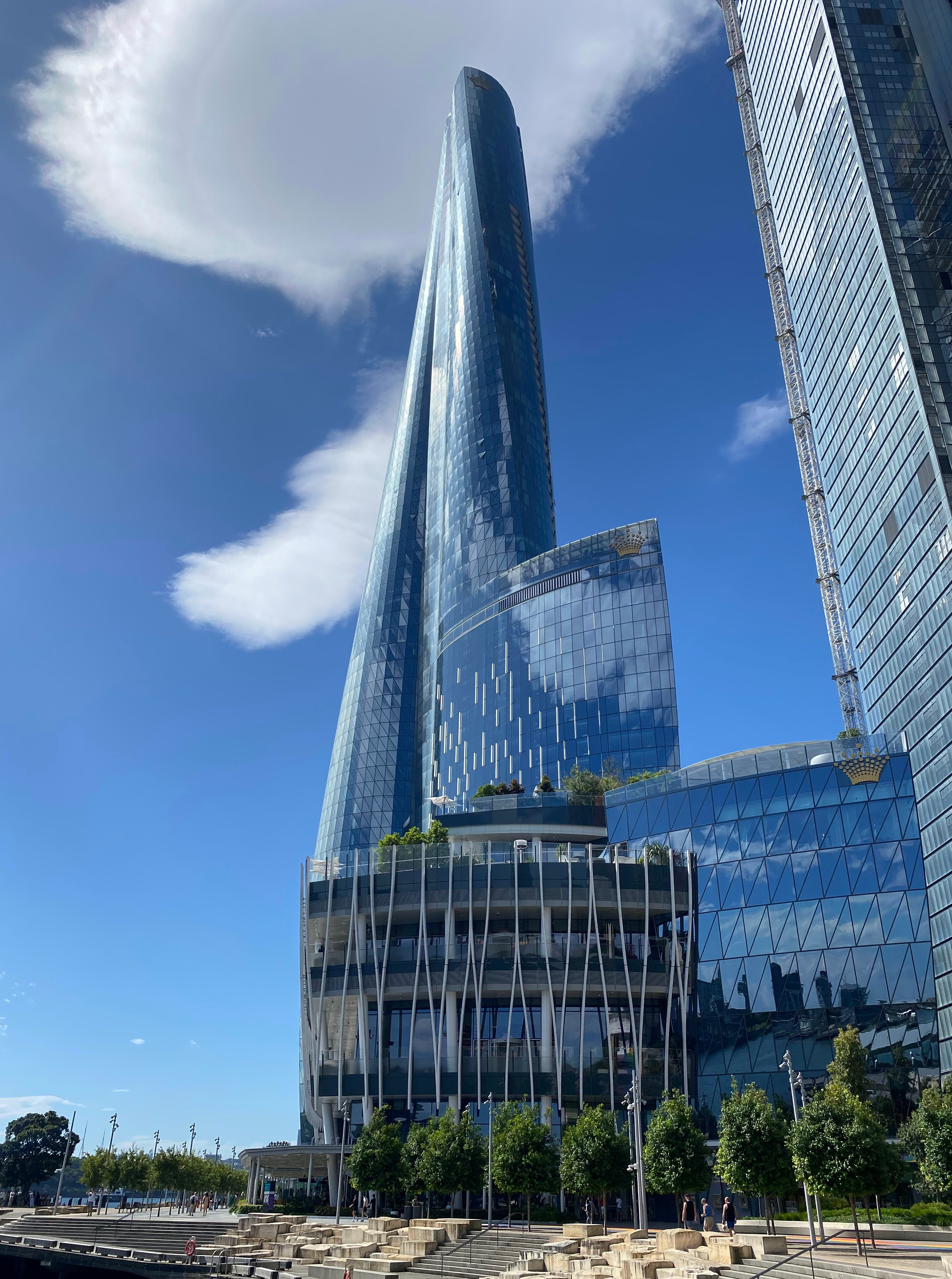
View of the southern face

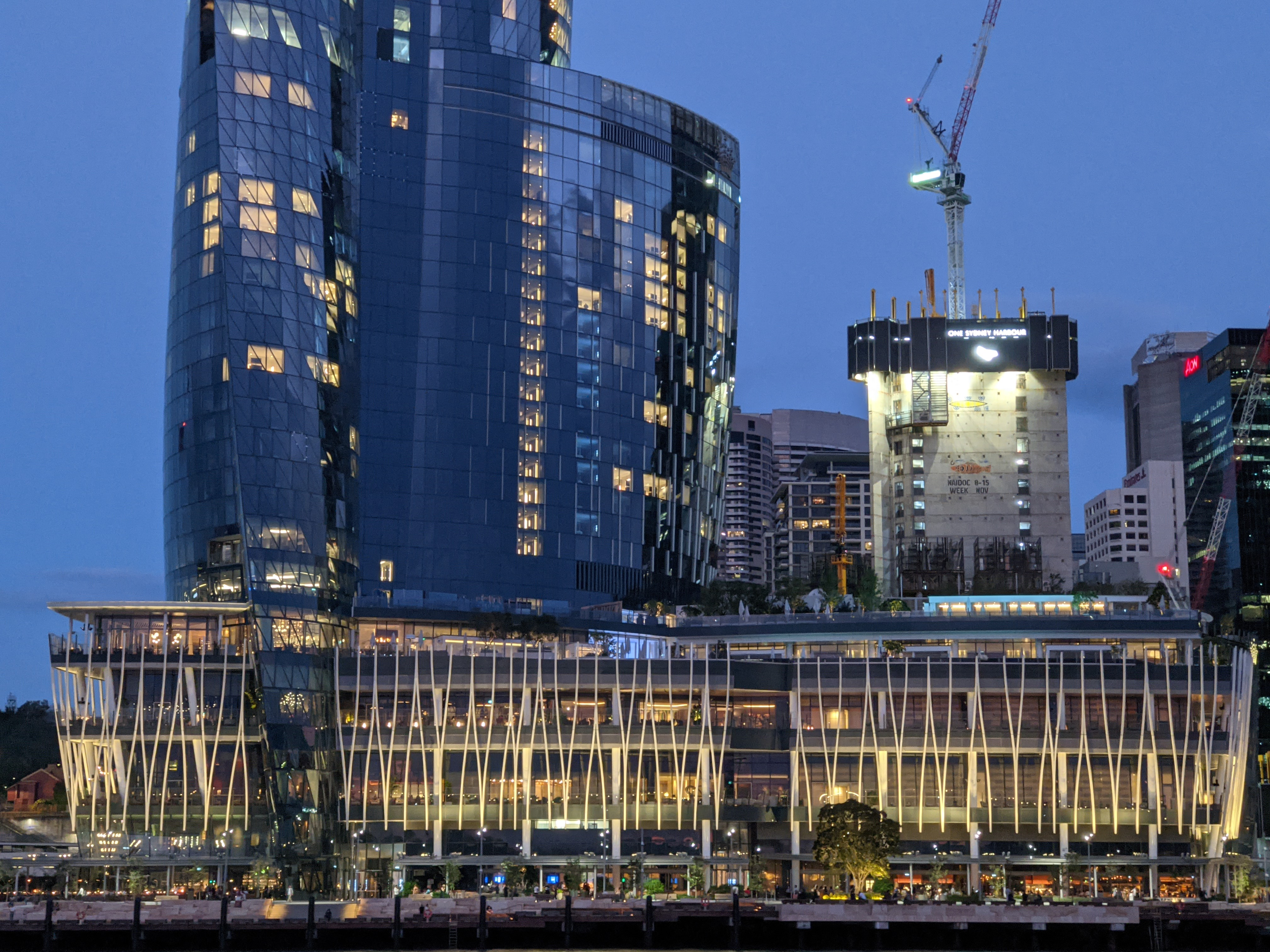
Podium viewed from the west

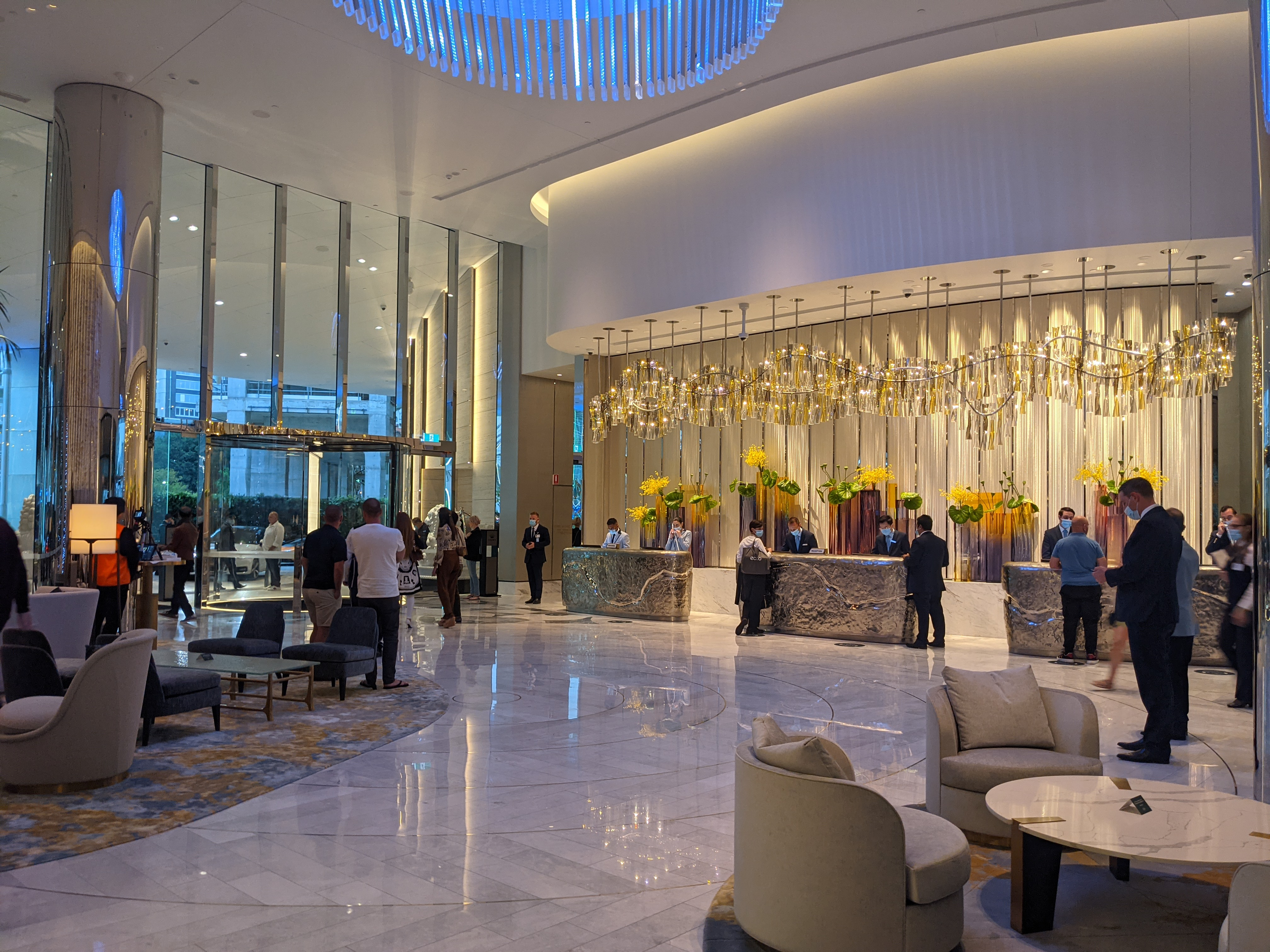
Main hotel lobby

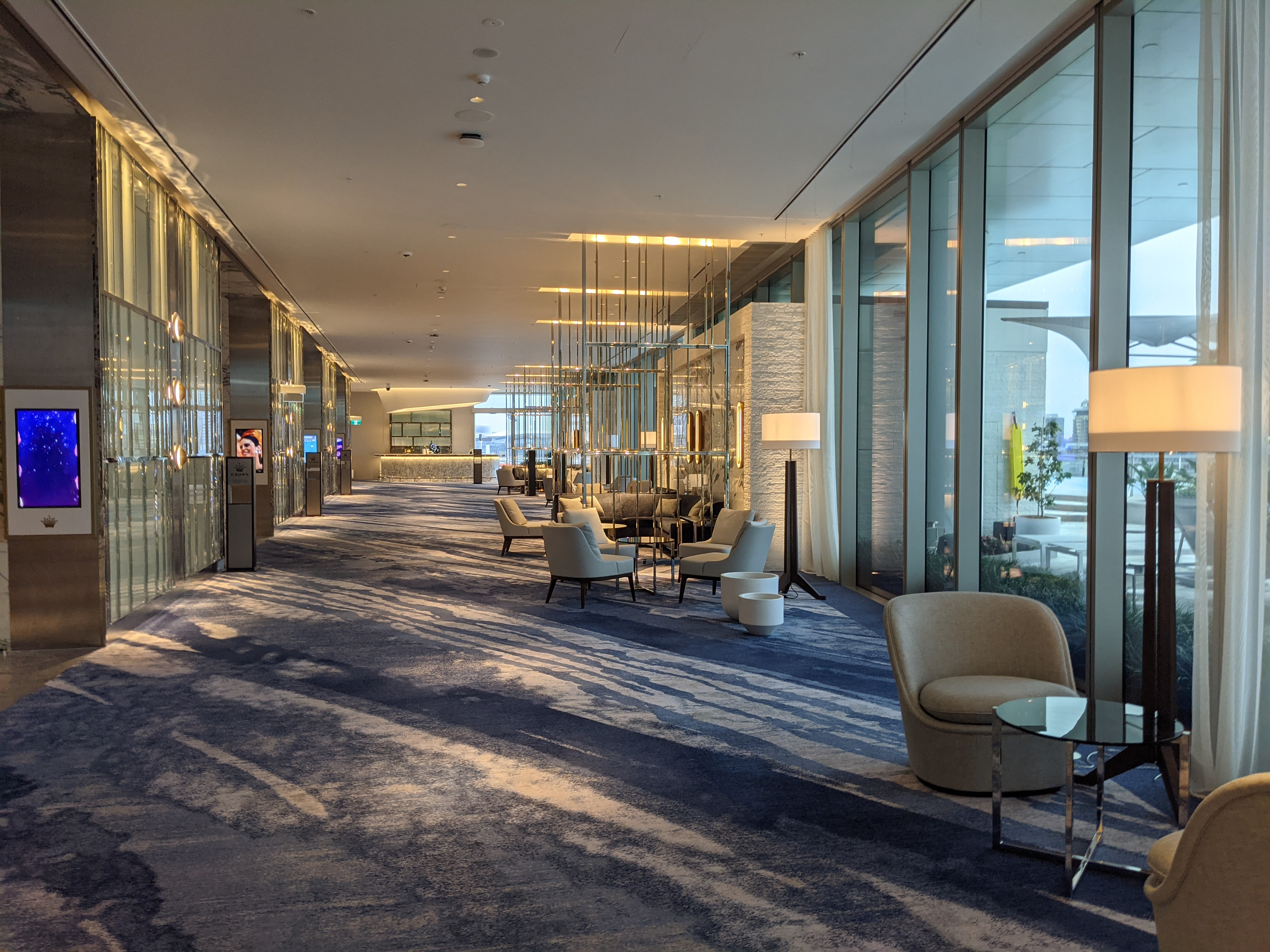
Lift lobby

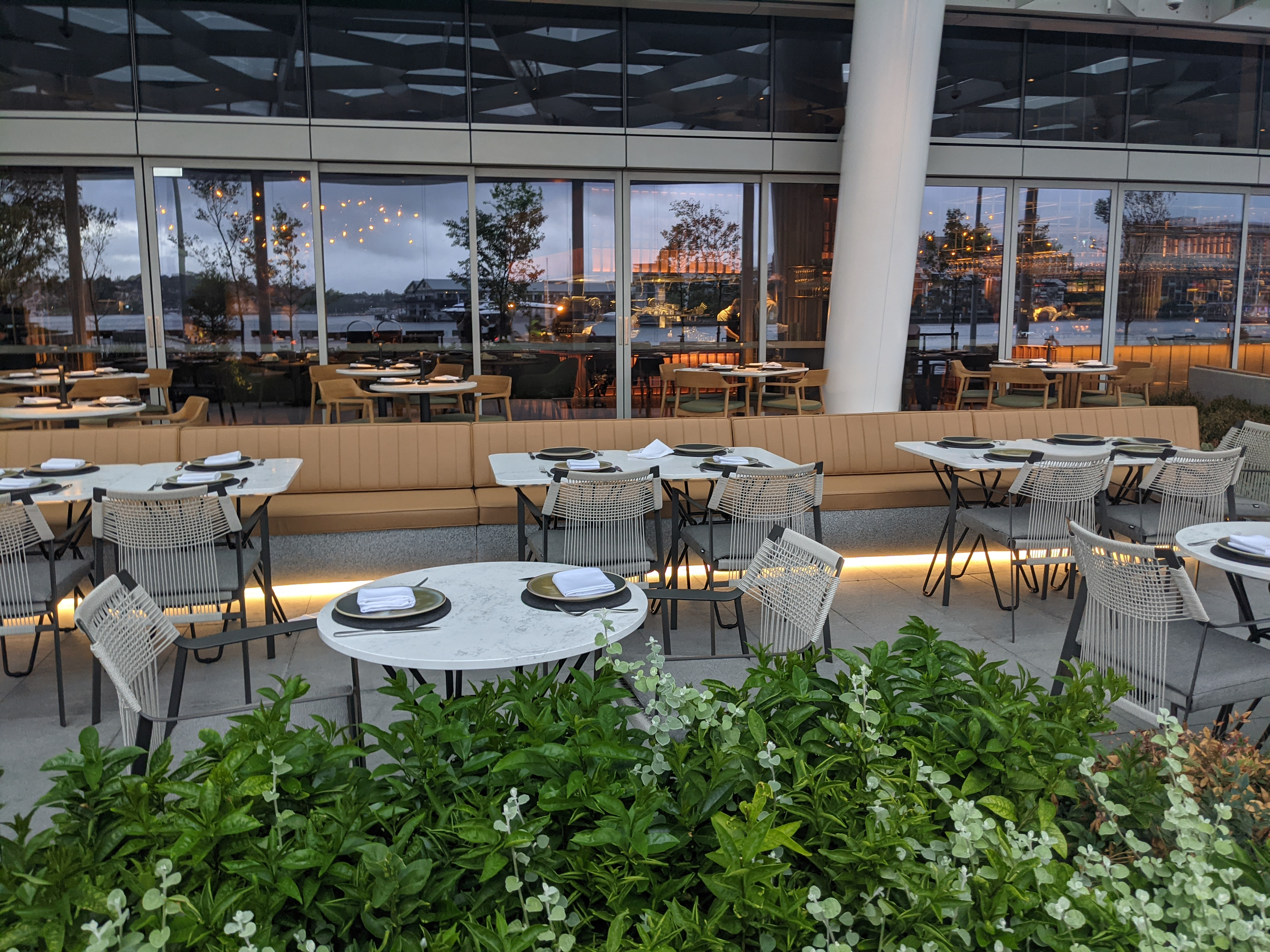
Outdoor dining

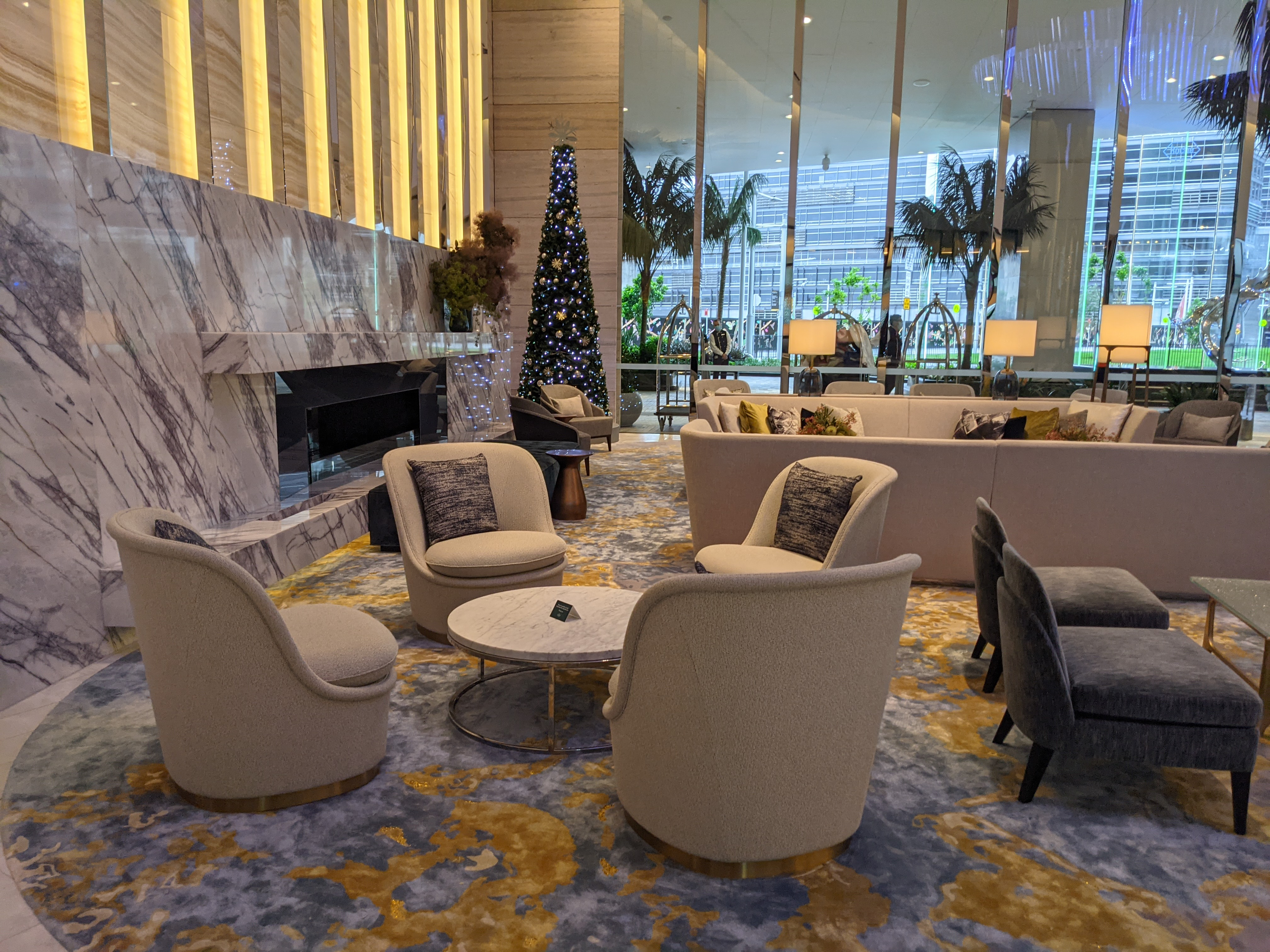
Lounge in main lobby

== Popular opinion ==
Popular opinion is divided on the design of the tower. Australian and international media have reported that the building has been nicknamed "Packer's Pecker", in reference to its primary proponent, James Packer, and its outsized massing and phallic shape. Former Australian prime minister Paul Keating admired the tower for its "Brancusi-like sculptural quality" and clean sculptural shape. Some architectural commentators have commented unfavourably on the quality of the design, especially compared to other works by its designers. On the other hand, Crown Resorts has described the tower as "epic" and having "opulence, style and substance".

Emporis named Crown Sydney as the winner of their prestigious Skyscraper Award in 2021; the first building in Australia to win the award in the competition's 20-year history. Coming ahead of the Telus Sky tower and One Vanderbilt in 2nd and 3rd places respectively, a jury of international architects attributed Crown Sydney's "extravagant design of (its) exterior facade" as the deciding factor for its first-place finish.

=== Sociological criticism ===
Researchers from the Responsible Gambling Fund financed, University of Sydney Gambling Treatment Clinic, have suggested that strategies such as a minimum bet size are not likely to prevent the local community from being affected by problem gambling. They have suggested that students, new immigrants and working class individuals are typically and more likely found to be losing large amounts of money at Casino style table and electronic games.

Academic researchers have suggested that while the casino is initially not licensed to offer poker machines, it will inevitably gain a licence in future years.

== See also ==
- Crown Resorts
- List of integrated resorts
- List of tallest buildings in Sydney
- List of tallest buildings in Australia
- Architecture of Sydney
