= Crown Sri Lanka =

Proposed casino and resort in Colombo, Sri Lanka

- Location: Beira Lake, Slave Island, Colombo, Sri Lanka
- Opened: Cancelled
- No. of rooms: 450
- Casino type: Land-based
- Owner: Crown Limited; Ravi Wijeratne

Crown Sri Lanka was a proposed casino and resort on the banks of the Beira Lake in Colombo, Sri Lanka. It was expected to cost $450 million and consist of two 36 floor buildings but the casino licenses were canceled by the government in 2015.

== History ==
In the post-war period, the Sri Lankan government under Mahinda Rajapaksa actively pursued new ventures to attract tourism and boost the country's economy, intending to take advantage of the island's close proximity to India. In this context, it intended to encourage the growth of a gambling industry, hoping to divert Indian and Chinese travelers from more established centers such as Singapore or Macau.

Crown Sri Lanka was one of three integrated resorts planned in Sri Lanka, located in the capital city Colombo. This was a joint partnership between Ravi Wijeratne (head of the Rank Holdings group) and Crown Limited, who each held a 45% stake.

The project was criticized by civil society groups (on the grounds of being contrary to the country's conservative principles), and by opposition parties, which alleged that the tax incentives given to the project were disproportionate and an unfair burden to the taxpayer. The project was slated to be completed by 2015, but a change in government led to the cancellation of all three casino licenses awarded by the previous administration- among them, that of the Crown Resorts project.
