= Crown Resorts =

Australian gambling and hospitality company

Crown Resorts Limited
- Type: Subsidiary
- Industry: Gambling, tourism
- Predecessor: Publishing & Broadcasting Limited
- Founded: 31 May 2007; 19 years ago
- Headquarters: Southbank, Melbourne, Australia
- Key people: David Tsai (Chief Executive Officer)
- Revenue: ▲ A$8.71 billion (2020-21)
- Parent: Blackstone
- Subsidiaries: Crown Melbourne; Crown Perth; Crown Sydney; Nobu
- Website: crownresorts.com.au

Crown Resorts Limited is an Australian gaming and entertainment group that owns and operates three integrated resorts, including Crown Melbourne, Crown Perth and Crown Sydney. It was listed on the Australian Securities Exchange until purchased by Blackstone in June 2022.

== History ==
=== 2000s ===
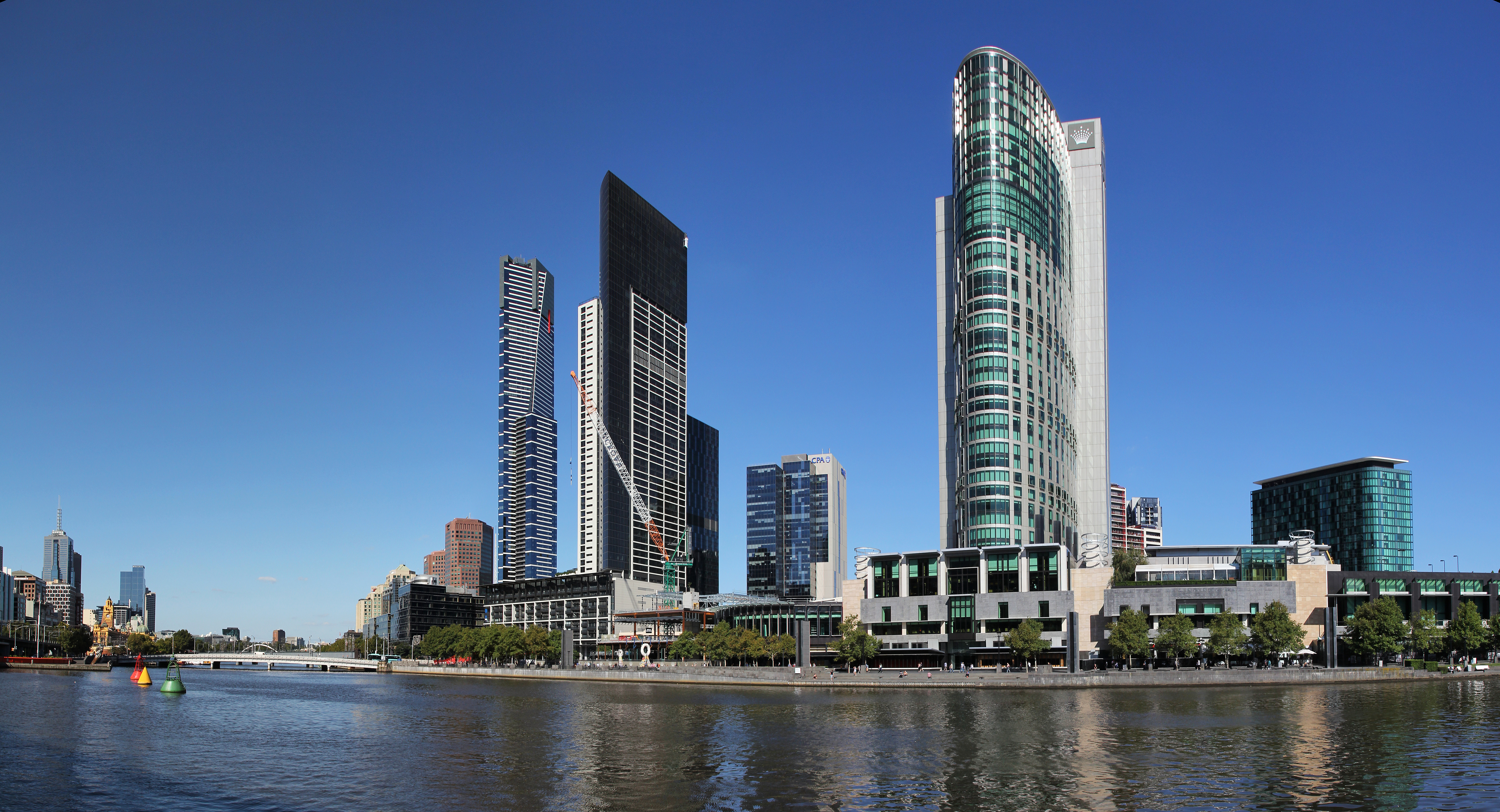
Crown Melbourne serves as the global corporate headquarters.

The company was established in 2007 when Publishing & Broadcasting Limited (PBL) divested its gambling assets to Crown Limited. PBL was renamed Consolidated Media Holdings, retaining all of the remaining assets.

In December 2007, Australian gambling company Crown Limited agreed to buy Cannery Casino Resorts (CCR) for $1.75 billion. The agreement was ended in March 2009, however, with Crown instead buying a 24.5 percent stake in the company for $370 million, and paying a $50 million termination fee.

In 2008, Crown attempted to enter the Las Vegas gambling market by acquiring a 19.6 per cent stake in Fontainebleau Resorts for US$250 million, which resulted in a total loss the following year when other investors withdrew US$800 million financing, resulting in bankruptcy applications. This was one of a succession of similar major losses in Gateway Casinos, Harrah's Entertainment and Station Casinos from which a total of $547.5 million was written off.

=== 2010s ===
In September 2013, the Sri Lankan government gave approval to Crown's then chairman and largest shareholder, James Packer, to invest in Crown Sri Lanka in the heart of the Sri Lankan capital Colombo. The project was to be completed by 2015. However, when a new government took office, President Maithripala Sirisena cancelled all three casino licenses awarded by the previous administration; including the Crown Resorts project.

In August 2014 Betfair completed the sale of their 50% stake in Betfair Australia to venture partner Crown Resorts.

On 5 August 2014, Crown bought the site of the New Frontier Hotel and Casino on the Las Vegas Strip for $280 million with the intent to build a new hotel beginning in 2015.

In December 2014, James Packer signed a deal with Matthew Tripp, which gained Packer control over Tripp's online betting platform BetEasy.

On 26 June 2015, Crown officially announced that the new $6 billion hotel, called Alon Las Vegas, was to be located on the former New Frontier site and to open in 2018. Crown announced in December 2016 that it was halting the project and seeking to sell its investment.

In October 2015, Crown acquired a 20 per cent stake in restaurant and hotel company Nobu for US$100 million.

In 2016, ground broke on Crown Sydney and was scheduled to open in 2020, which was planned for sometime thereafter the 14 December.

In February 2017, Barry Felstead replaced Rowen Craigie as CEO of Crown Melbourne. On 21 March 2018, James Packer resigned as an executive chairman of Crown Resorts.

In May 2019, Packer agreed to sell 20% of Crown's shares, representing nearly half his personal stake in the company, to Melco Resorts & Entertainment, for A$1.76 billion (US$1.22 billion). Melco is led by Lawrence Ho, Packer's former joint venture partner in Melco Crown Entertainment. On 8 August 2019, the gaming regulator in the state of New South Wales (NSW), the Independent Liquor and Gaming Authority (ILGA), announced that it was conducting an inquiry into Melco's deal for Crown's shares based on new information that Lawrence Ho was until 28 June 2019 a director of a company with which Crown was forbidden to associate. The inquiry will also look into allegations made on a recent broadcast of Australia's 60 Minutes television program.

=== 2020s ===
In December 2020, due to ongoing inquiry in the Supreme Court of New South Wales, Crown Sydney was granted a temporary liquor licence and allowed to open its accommodation, dining and bar facilities - pending court findings expected at the beginning of February 2021; this licence was valid until 30 April 2021 and did not allow for the opening of any gaming floors and/or associated gambling activities in any capacity. Therefore a soft opening of several restaurants, and accommodation facilities resulted in the final days of 2020, with more opening in the new year. In February 2021, Supreme Court Justice findings informed that Crown Limited were deemed "unsuitable" to operate in the state of NSW without significant cultural, operational and managerial change - but that the NSW government body, the Independent Liquor and Gaming Authority (ILGA) would ultimately have the final say; the ILGA report (penned to the NSW Parliament) reinforced these findings, leaving Crown Sydney's gaming operations' debut stalled indefinitely whilst also turning the future of Crown in Australia somewhat of a gamble. The relevant Member of Parliament for NSW stated their response would come after scrutiny of said report, whilst Crown Resorts Limited inferred mutual scrutiny with no mention of when a statement would be released to the public.

In December 2021, Crown announced plans to premier the gambling element within its Crown Sydney development ‘early in the new year’.

In February 2022, Crown Resorts accepted a A$8.9 billion takeover offer from US private equity firm Blackstone. The deal was approved by the Federal Court of Australia in June 2022 and Crown was delisted from the Australian Securities Exchange.

In July 2024, Crown sold its stake in Nobu to a Blackstone portfolio company for US$180 million (A$266 million).

In 2025, Crown Resorts sold Crown London Aspinalls to Wynn Resorts.

== Holdings ==
- Crown Melbourne
- Crown Perth
- Crown Sydney
- Aspers Group – Group of four UK casinos which Crown owns a 50 per cent stake in
- Betfair Australasia – Online betting exchange
- DGN Games – Texas-based casino game developer
- Chill Gaming – A 50/50 game development joint-venture between Crown and New Gaming

=== Former ===
- Melco Crown Entertainment: A joint venture with Melco International Development developing casino/hotel properties in Cotai, Macau, including City of Dreams and Altira Macau (34%)
- Crown London Aspinalls
- Alon Las Vegas: Resort and casino opening in 2018
- Cannery Casino Resorts: Operates casinos and hotels in Nevada and Western Pennsylvania, USA (24.5%)
- Crown Sri Lanka (45%): A proposed joint venture property in Colombo, Sri Lanka to be reportedly built through the Lake Leisure Holdings consortium in 2017
- Fontainebleau Resorts (19.6%)
- Nobu – Restaurant and hotel operator which Crown held a 20 per cent stake in from 2015 to 2024

== Gallery ==
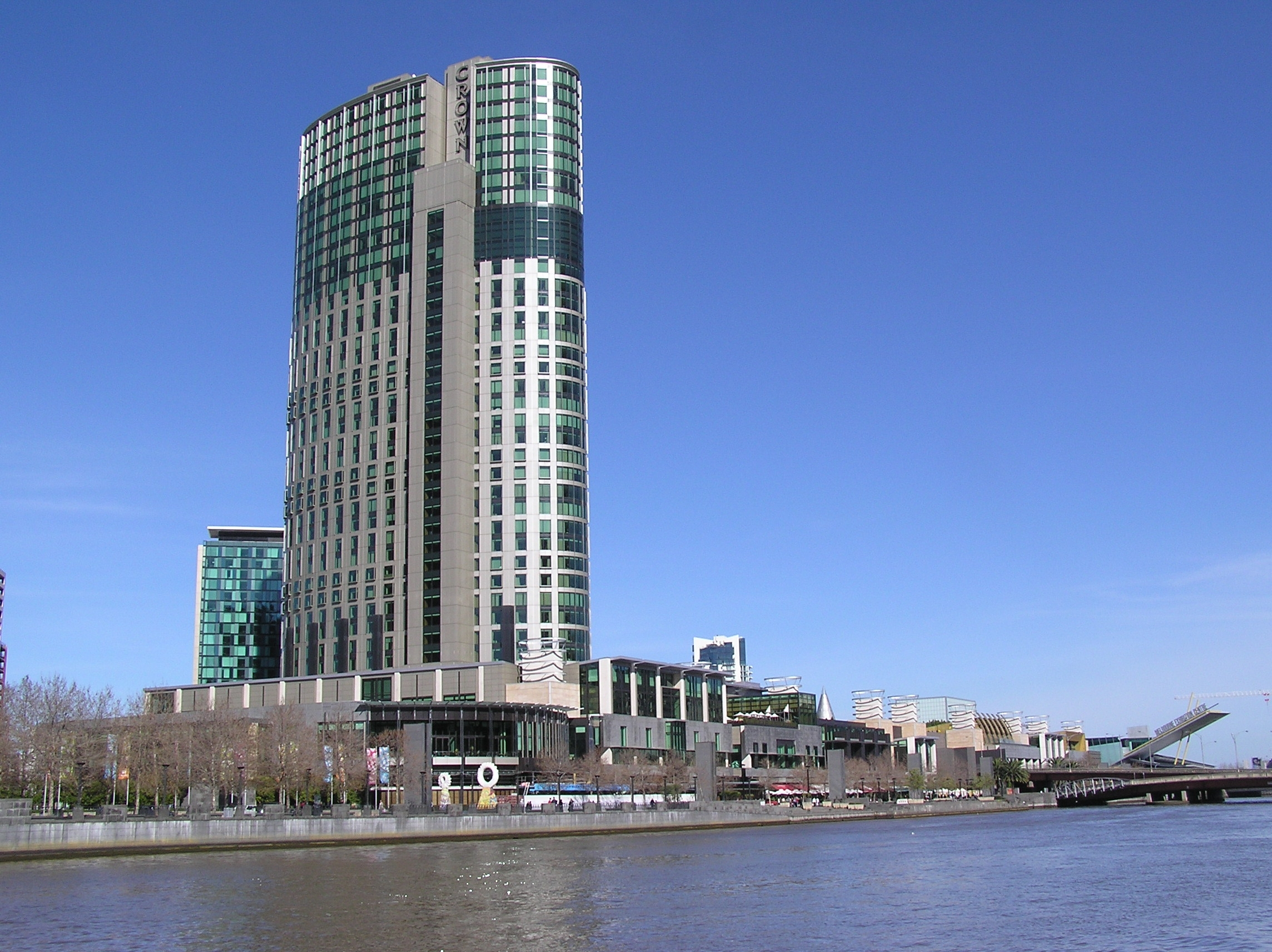
Crown Melbourne

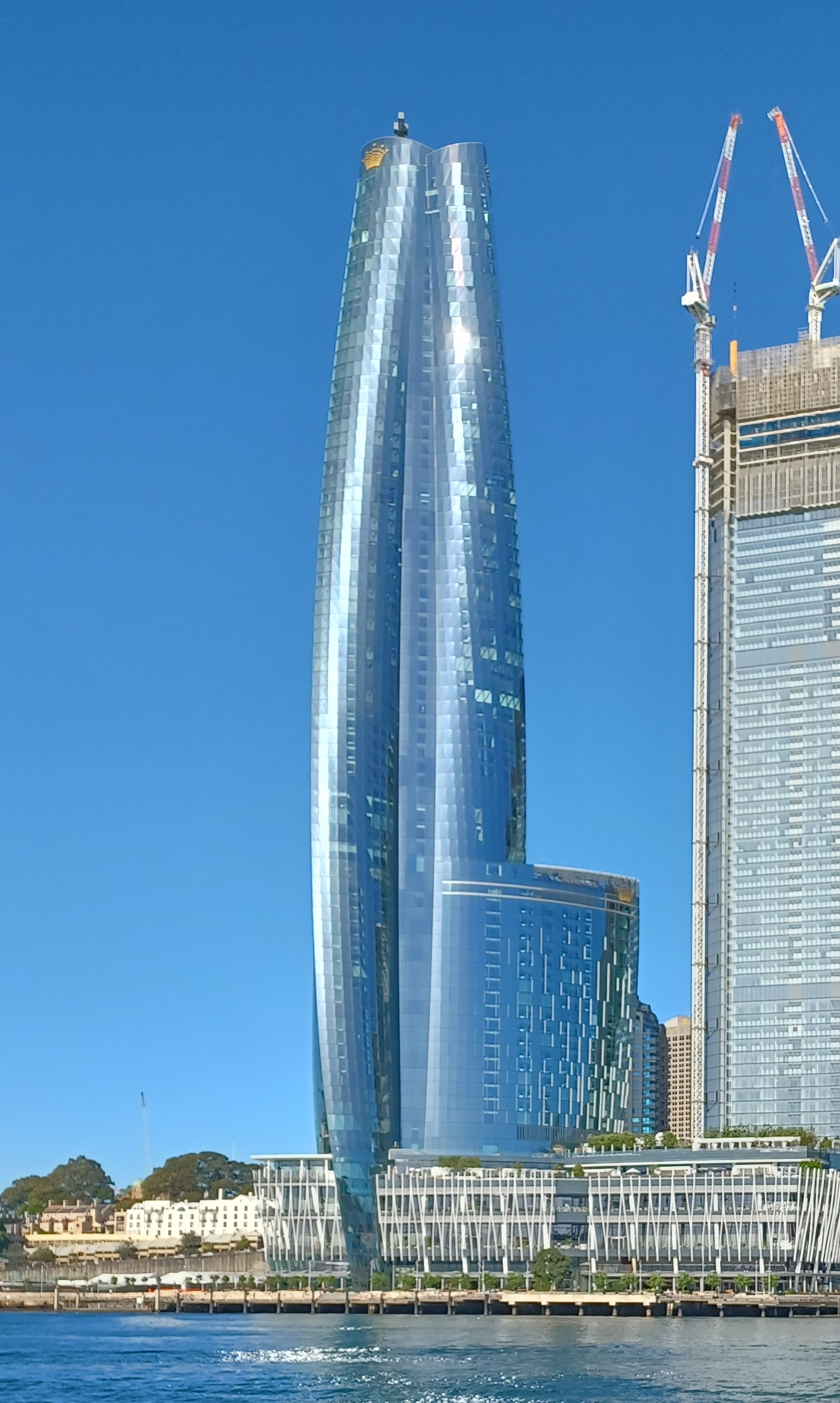
Crown Sydney

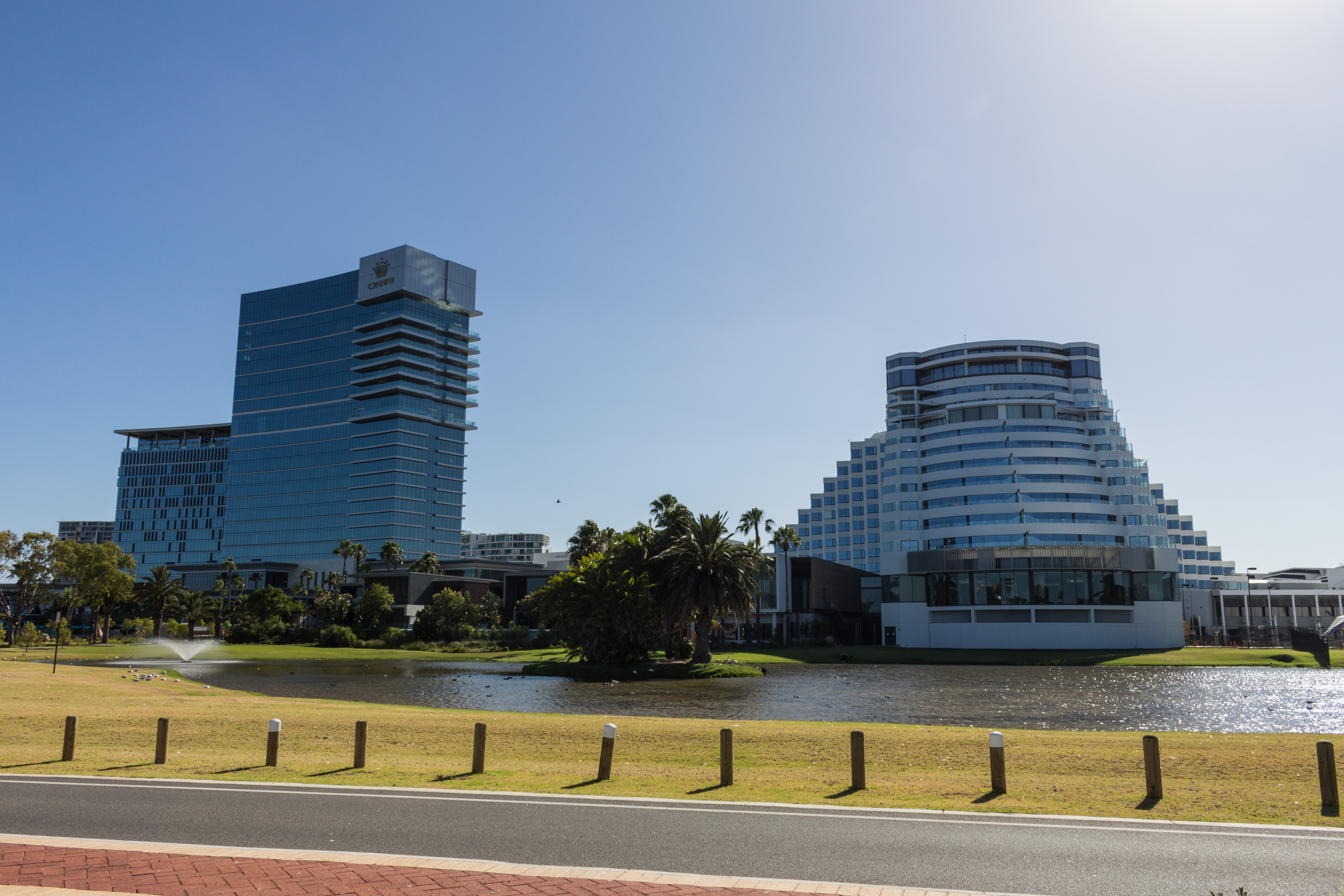
Crown Perth

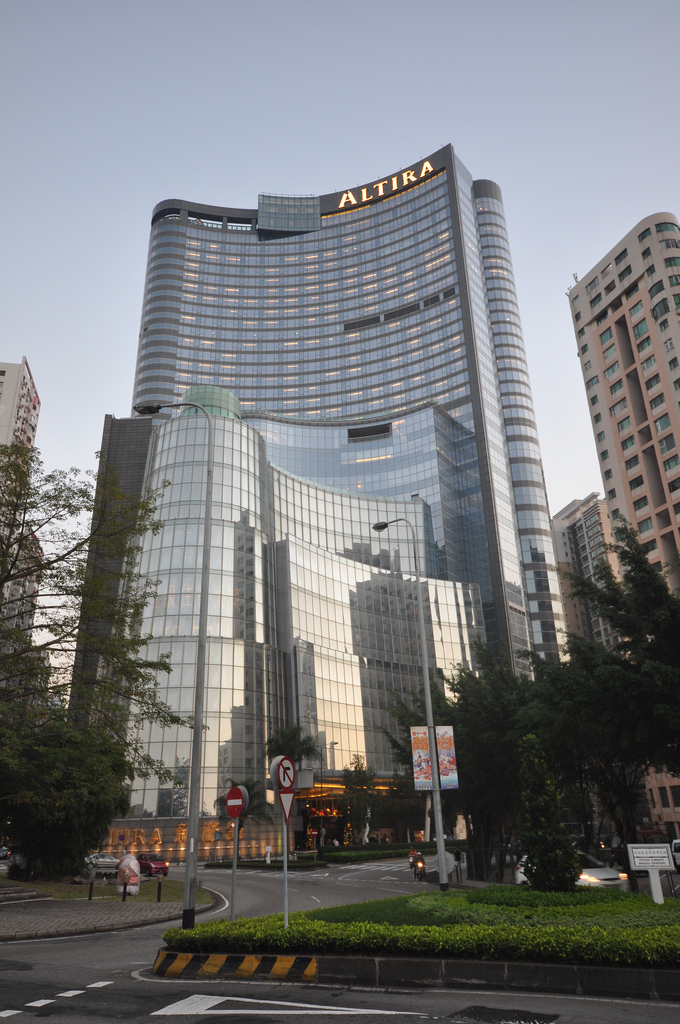
Altira Macau

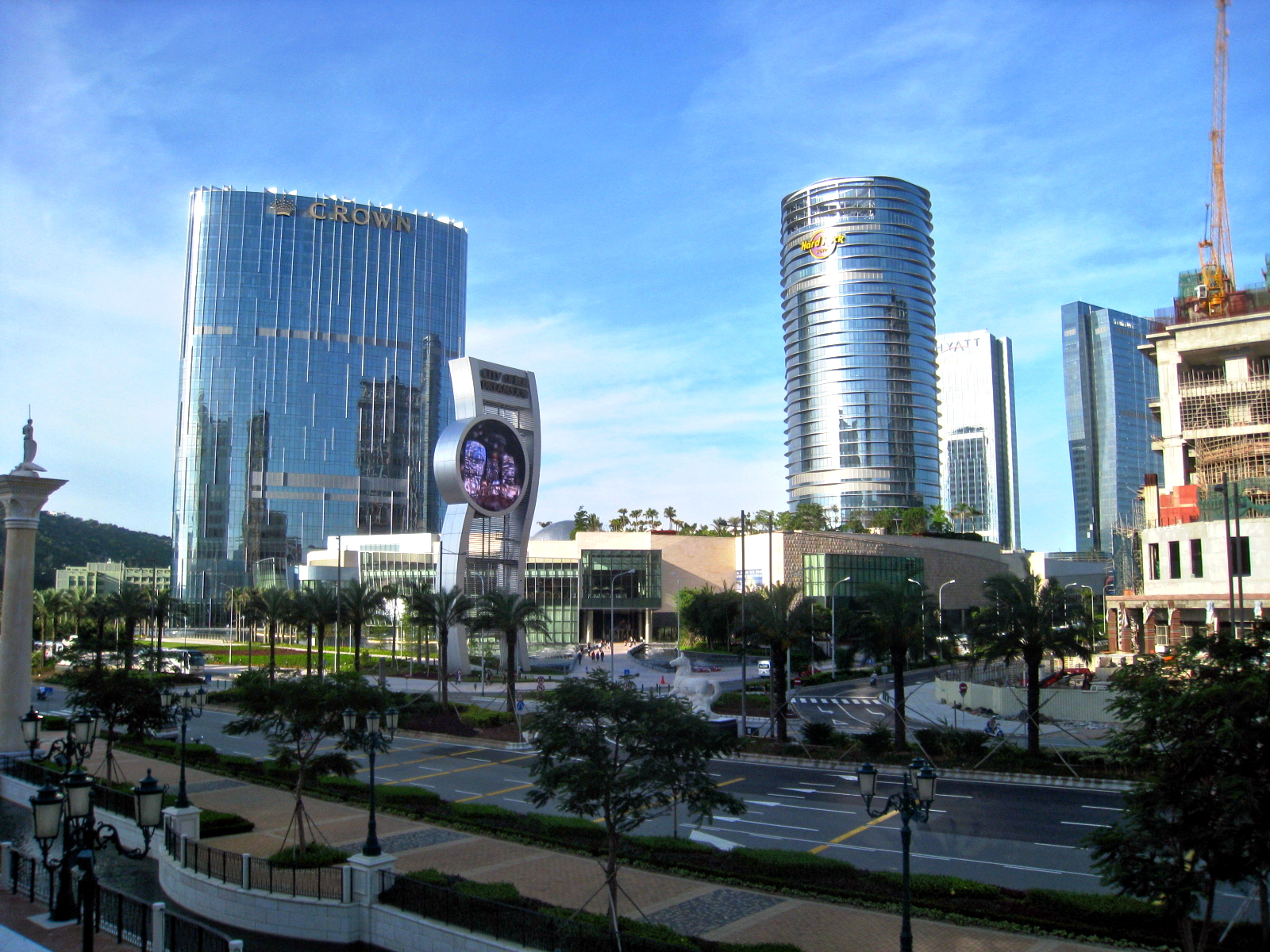
City of Dreams, Macau

== Crown Rewards ==
Crown Rewards is the loyalty program for Crown Melbourne, Crown Sydney and Crown Perth. The program features five different tiers (member, silver, gold, platinum, and black). Everyone starts at the member tier and can upgrade their card when they attain a certain amount of status credits. Membership status is reviewed every six months and cards can be downgraded due to inactivity. Status credits can be earned by accumulating points. Either 500 casino points or 1,500 lifestyle points form one status credit. Casino points are earned when a player inserts their reward card into a poker machine or when they hand their Crown Reward card to the croupier. When earning lifestyle points, every dollar spent on hotels, restaurants, bars, retail, or events earns 5 points. Points can also be redeemed without effecting the user's ability to earn status credits with 100 points usually equaling a $1 reward.

== Philanthropy ==
The company's Crown Resorts Foundation makes grants to the arts, community welfare, education, health care and the environment. In July 2014 Crown's chairman and largest shareholder James Packer launched a new initiative, the National Philanthropic Fund, to which his family foundation, and the Crown foundation would each contribute $100 million over ten years to support community projects in Australia.

== Controversies ==
=== Illegal advertising ===
In April 2016, the company's joint venture with Matthew Tripp, CrownBet pleaded guilty to five counts of breaching laws by publishing illegal betting advertising that offered inducements for NSW residents to gamble. According to NSW Department of Justice, CrownBet "sought to have the matters finalised without conviction in Downing Centre Local Court yesterday but Magistrate Joanne Keogh said convictions were necessary for general deterrence to others in the industry and to protect the vulnerable. CrownBet was convicted of the five offences and ordered to pay a total of $10,500 in fines and also ordered to pay Liquor & Gaming NSW legal costs of $10,000."

=== 60 Minutes 'Crown Unmasked' ===
In July 2019, Nine Network's investigative TV program 60 Minutes aired a report titled Crown Unmasked which made allegations that Crown had violated Chinese law by promoting its casinos to mainland gamblers. The investigation, which was assisted by The Age and the Sydney Morning Herald newspapers (which became sister businesses of Nine Network after Nine Entertainment acquired Fairfax Media in 2018) and featured comments from former Crown employees, also questioned Crown's relationships with certain junket operators — the middlemen who help recruit VIP gamblers and act as credit agents to get around China's capital controls — that have been linked to Hong Kong's triads. The investigation also revealed the existence of an arrangement with Australia's Department of Home Affairs to speed up processing of short-stay visa applications by Crown's VIP gamblers. Crown denied the report's claims, publishing advertisements in local newspapers calling the investigation “a deceitful campaign” that relied on “unsubstantiated allegations, exaggerations, unsupported connections and outright falsehoods.” Federal and state authorities, including the Australian Commission for Law Enforcement Integrity and the Australian Criminal Intelligence Commission, have opened probes into the allegations.

=== Government inquiries ===
In February 2021 an inquiry by New South Wales deemed Crown unfit to hold a gaming license. Meaning that gaming would not be allowed at Crown Sydney saying that Crown facilitated hundred of millions of dollars' worth of money laundering in Crown Perth and Crown Melbourne. And that junket operators who brought high-rollers in were linked to organized crime. It also stated Crown used a $2 shell company Riverbank Investments Pty Ltd and another company called Southbank for money laundering. On 22 February 2021 it was also reported that Victoria would establish a royal commission into Crown Melbourne. Western Australia has also announced an inquiry into Crown and has banned Crown from using overseas junket operators in Crown Perth.

In March 2022 the Royal Commission issued its final report concluding that the company is unsuitable to run its Perth casino, but was given two years to return to suitability under the watch of an independent monitor. Crown Resorts responded in a statement released to the Australian Stock Exchange, acknowledging the findings and promising to work with the government to reach compliance.

In May 2022, Crown Resorts was fined $80m for illegally accepting Chinese bank cards in its casino in Melbourne. The transactions were falsely classified as hotel services. This fine ensured that Crown Resorts was stripped of its revenue derived from the process.

In July of 2025, the Gaming and Wagering Commission of Western Australia recommended that Crown Perth keep its gaming license after adequate remedial efforts were made to make the casino compliant with government gaming regulations. Crown Resorts had also made changes within their corporate governance to return themselves to good standing within the framework of Australian gaming regulations.

=== Internal investigations ===
In December 2023, the company launched an internal investigation into allegations that its chief executive officer, Ciaran Carruthers, had intervened and permitted patrons to gamble despite them having been blocked by security. The first alleged incident occurred on 25 November 2023 when Carruthers was claimed to have allowed an intoxicated woman access the Victoria facility's gaming floor. The second incident alleges he allowed a patron into the premises who has been subject to a one-year ban for bringing a minor into a casino area. Chief Legal and Compliance Officer for Crown Resorts Limited, Anthony Pearl, confirmed the internal review in accordance with "governance protocols" that were laid down in reform recommendations from the company's 2021 license review.

In February 2024, the internal investigation ended, and Carruthers was cleared of the allegations. The Victorian Gambling and Casino Control Commission had been conducting its own probe into the alleged actions of Carruthers but told the Australian Financial Review it is satisfied with Crown Resorts Limited’s handling of the matter.

== See also ==
- Gambling in Australia
- Palmerbet
- List of integrated resorts
- List of casino hotels
