= Responsible Gambling Fund =

The Responsible Gambling Fund (RGF) advises the Government of New South Wales (NSW) in Australia on the allocation of funds for initiatives and programs that support responsible gambling and reduce gambling addiction in the state.

The RGF was established under the Casino Control Act of 1992, which requires each casino license in NSW to contribute to the fund, currently set at 2% of gaming revenue.

== Office of Responsible Gambling ==
The Office of Responsible Gambling is part of the NSW Department of Customer Service and leads the development of responsible gambling strategy and public policy advice to the NSW Government. It supports and manages the RGF, Club, grants Category 3, and Community Development Fund.

== RGF Trustees ==
The RGF is administered by nine Trustees who meet at least six times a year to advise the Minister on appropriate allocation of funds and on gambling policy. The Trustees are:

- John Dalzell (Chair) – chair of Denton' global litigation and dispute resolution group
- Dr. Clive Allcock – psychiatrist and founding member of the National Association for Gambling Studies
- Professor Paul Delfabbro – gambling researcher and a lecturer in psychology at the University of Adelaide
- Dr. Greg Hugh – psychiatrist and clinical director of Dubbo Hospital's mental health inpatient unit
- Elizabeth Lyne – accountant and auditor in public practice and commercial accounting
- Mark McCrindle – social researcher and founder of McCrindle Research
- Janett Milligan – senior executive from NSW Government
- Professor Joel Negin – head of the University of Sydney's School of Public Health
- Paul Newson – formerly the Deputy Secretary of Liquor, Gaming & Racing

== RGF-funded projects and initiatives ==
In 2018/19, $30 million was committed from the RGF to support responsible gambling in NSW. The Responsible Gambling Fund priority areas for 2018 - 2021 are:

- A research agenda to formulate responsible gambling policy and initiatives
- Investing in community education
- Providing support and counseling services for people experiencing gambling issues and their family members and friends
- Assisting the regulator to develop gambling policy

The RGF also funds Gambling Help NSW which provides support and advice for anyone with gambling problems :

- Phone counseling 24 hours a day, 7 days a week
- Face-to-face gambling counseling available in 270 locations across NSW
- Online chat with a gambling counselor via live online chat or email 24/7
- Specific support services for women, Aboriginal and/or Torres Strait Islander persons or people from multicultural communities
- Financial counseling and legal hep
- Information and tools relating to gambling

== RGF-funded campaigns ==
- 2018, 2019 – "Responsible Gambling Awareness Week" 16–22 September 2019: An annual RGF initiative to increase awareness of gambling and gambling harm in the NSW community.
- 2017, 2018, 2019 – "Show some Briquette": An RGF advertising campaign designed to demonstrate responsible gambling to young males aged 18–35, considered at risk of developing a gambling problem in the context of online sports betting.
- 2014 – "Talk ward": An RGF social media campaign encouraging problem gamblers and family and friends of problem gamblers to address gambling issues, provide support to one another and share information about gambling support and resources available in NSW.
- 2014, 2015, 2016 – "Stronger Than You Think": The RGF contracted advertising agency Loud to produce a campaign promoting seeking help for problem gambling as a strength rather than weakness.
- 2012 – "What's gambling really costing you?": The RGF contracted Why Documentaries to produce a campaign for Multicultural Health Communication Services.
- 2008 – "Gambling Hangover": The RGF contracted The Campaign Palace to develop a campaign aimed at males between the ages of 18 and 24. The campaign focused on the "morning after" experience of a problem gambler.
