= List of Cranbrook School, Sydney alumni =

This is a list of notable old boys of Cranbrook School, Sydney, former students – known as "Old Cranbrookians" – of Cranbrook School, an Anglican school in Bellevue Hill, New South Wales, Australia.

== Academia and medicine ==
- Prof. David Cooper AC FRACP FRCP FAA FAHMS – HIV researcher
- Prof. James Dale AC – professor of biotechnology at Queensland University of Technology
- Assoc. Prof. Paul Darveniza – senior lecturer in neurology at St. Vincent's Clinical School, University of New South Wales and international rugby union Wallaby
- Prof. Richard Hunter FBA – Regius professor of Greek and fellow of Trinity College, the University of Cambridge
- John Miles Little – surgeon and academic; former head boy at Cranbrook
- Earl Owen AO – microsurgeon pioneer
- Yi-Fu Tuan – emeritus professor at the University of Wisconsin-Madison; one of the first Cranbrook students of Asian descent

== Business ==
- Rodney Adler – former director of failed telecommunications company One.Tel and HIH Insurance
- Mike Cannon-Brookes – CEO and co-founder of Atlassian
- Michael Crouch AC – former chairman of Zip Industries
- Ken Dixon – chairman of Rowntree's
- James Fairfax AC – former arts patron and philanthropist (also attended Geelong Grammar School)
- David Gyngell – CEO of Australian commercial broadcasting network, Channel Nine
- Samuel Hordern CMG – stockbroker and Grazier
- The Hon Clyde Packer – journalist, media entrepreneur, politician and author
- James Packer AM – chairman of CPH Investments and Crown Limited
- Kerry Packer AC – former richest man in Australia, media tycoon (9 Network, the Australian Consolidated Press, Foxtel, etc.)
- Jodee Rich – founder of One.Tel and PeopleBrowsr

== Government, politics and the law ==
- The Hon Tim Bruxner – former elected member of the NSW Parliament and Deputy Premier of New South Wales
- The Hon Ben Franklin – elected member, and President of the Legislative Council of New South Wales as part of the National Party.
- Hugh Gilchrist OAM – diplomat and author of Australians and Greeks
- Sir David Griffin CBE – elected 74th Lord Mayor of Sydney
- Michael Knight AO – elected former member of the NSW Parliament and Sydney 2000 Olympics Minister
- Julian Martin Leeser – Liberal Party shadow minister and member for Berowra
- Thomas Walter Mitchell – Country Party member for Benambra in the Victorian Legislative Assembly and Attorney-General
- The Hon Dugald Munro CMG – former grazier and member for Eden-Monaro.
- Andrew Rogers AO, QC – justice of the Supreme Court of New South Wales; spouse of Helen Coonan, a former Australian senator
- John Spender KC – Liberal party member for North Sydney and Australian Ambassador to France, husband to fashionista Carla Zampatti, and father of Allegra Spender.
- The Hon Sir Laurence Whistler Street AC, KCMG – 14th chief justice of New South Wales

== Media, entertainment and the arts ==
- Oliver Ackland – actor
- Sumner Locke Elliott – writer, playwright
- Billy Field – singer and songwriter
- John Gaden AO – actor
- Peter Kingston AM – artist
- Mungo Wentworth MacCallum – political journalist, humorist and commentator
- Jim Maxwell AM – ABC Radio cricket commentator
- Garry McDonald AO – comedian, star of Mother and Son and creator of alter-ego Norman Gunston
- Craig McGregor – writer/novelist, academic, and cultural critic
- Sam Reid – film & television actor, co-lead of Interview with the Vampire and The Newsreader
- Adam Shand – writer and freelance journalist, located in Africa for three years to report on Rwanda and Zimbabwe
- Martin Sharp AM – artist, cartoonist, songwriter, and filmmaker
- Tony Sheldon – stage actor/singer, film and TV actor
- Harvey Shore – Logie-winning TV writer/producer
- Peter Vogel – co-designer of the Fairlight CMI
- Patrick White – writer awarded the Nobel Prize in Literature
- Kip Williams – artistic director of Sydney Theatre Company
- Simon Wincer – film director

== Military ==
- Group Captain Pete Jeffrey DSO, DFC – WWII fighter ace
- Air Marshal Sir James Anthony Rowland AC, KBE, DFC, AFC – former naval officer, governor of New South Wales and chancellor of the University of Sydney

== Sport ==
- Daniel Batman (1998) – Sydney 2000 Olympic 400m runner (also attended The Scots College)
- Edward Cowan (2000) – test cricketer
- Paul Darveniza – international rugby union Wallaby and neurologist
- James Hunter (2009) – basketball player
- Luke Kendall – basketball player
- Sam Konstas (2023) – cricketer
- Will Langford (2010) – Australian rules football premiership player (2014) for Hawthorn Football Club
- Grae Morris – Paris 2024 Olympic silver medal windsurfer
- Cecil Purdy AO – chess International Master and inaugural World Correspondence Chess champion
- Murray Rose AM (1956) – Olympic gold medal swimmer
- Steven Solomon (2011) – London 2012 Olympic 400m runner
- William Somerville – New Zealand cricket bowler
- Ed Stubbs (2006) – rugby 7s representative

== See also ==
- Combined Associated Schools
