= List of corporate collapses and scandals =

A corporate collapse typically involves the insolvency or bankruptcy of a major business enterprise. A corporate scandal involves alleged or actual unethical behavior by people acting within or on behalf of a corporation. Many recent corporate collapses and scandals have involved some type of false or inappropriate accounting (see List of accounting scandals).

== List of major corporate collapses ==
The following list of corporations involved major collapses, through the risk of job losses or size of the business, and meant entering into insolvency or bankruptcy, or being nationalised or requiring a non-market loan by a government.

Name	HQ	Date	Business	Causes	Assets
Medici Bank	Florence	1494	Banking	Owned by the Medici family, it ran up large debts due to the family's profligate spending, extravagant lifestyle, and failure to control the managers.	
Mississippi Company	France	Sep 1720	Colonialism	Scottish economist John Law convinced the French government to support a monopoly trade venture in Louisiana. He marketed shares based on great wealth, which was highly exaggerated. A speculative bubble grew and then collapsed, and Law was expelled.	
South Sea Company	Great Britain	Sep 1720	Slavery and colonialism	After the War of Spanish Succession, Great Britain signed the Treaty of Utrecht 1713 with Spain, ostensibly allowing it to trade in the seas near South America. In fact, barely any trade took place as Spain renounced the Treaty. However, this was concealed on the British stock market. A speculative bubble saw the share price reach over £1000 in August 1720, but then crash in September. A Parliamentary inquiry revealed fraud among members of the government, including the Conservative Party Chancellor of the Exchequer John Aislabie, who was sent to prison.	
Dutch East India Company	Batavian Republic	31 December 1799	Colonialism	This huge early publicly listed multinational company founded in 1602 fell victim to declining markets in the late 18th century, internal corruption and excessive distribution of dividends (in excess of its profits), and finally Anglo-Dutch wars. It was nationalised by the Batavian Republic in 1796 but nevertheless closed down at the end of 1799.	
Overend, Gurney & Co	United Kingdom	June 1866	Banking	After Samuel Gurney's retirement, the bank invested heavily in railway stocks. It went public in 1865, but was badly affected by a general fall in stock prices. The Bank of England refused to advance money, and it collapsed. The directors were sued, but exonerated from fraud.	
Friedrich Krupp	Germany	1873	Steel, metals	Krupp's business over-expanded, and had to take a 30m Mark loan from the Preußische Bank, the Bank of Prussia.	
Danatbank	Germany	13 July 1931	Banking	At the start of the Great Depression, after rumours about the solvency of the Norddeutsche Wollkämmerei & Kammgarnspinnerei, there was a bank run, and Danatbank was forced into insolvency.	
Allied Crude Vegetable Oil Refining Corp	United States	16 Nov 1963	Commodities	Commodities trader Tino De Angelis defrauded clients, including the Bank of America into thinking he was trading vegetable oil. He got loans and made money using the oil as collateral. He showed inspectors tankers of water, with a bit of oil on the surface. When the fraud was exposed, the business collapsed.	
Herstatt Bank	West Germany	26 June 1974	Banking	Settlement risk. Counterparty banks did not receive their USD payments, where Herstatt had received DEM earlier, prior to government-forced liquidation.	
Carrian Group	Hong Kong	1983	Real estate	Accounting fraud. An auditor was murdered, an adviser committed suicide. The largest collapse in Hong Kong history.	
Texaco	United States	13 April 1987	Oil	After a legal battle with Pennzoil, whereby it was found to owe a debt of $10.5 bn, Texaco went into bankruptcy. It was later resurrected and taken over by Chevron.	
Qintex	Australia	1989	Real estate	Qintex CEO Christopher Skase was found to have improperly used his position to obtain management fees prior to the $1.5 billion collapse of Qintex including $700m unpaid debts. Skase absconded to the Spanish resort island of Majorca. Spain refused extradition for 10 years during which time Skase became a citizen of Dominica.	
Lincoln Savings and Loan Association	United States	1989	Banking	Financial institution that went bust following the Keating Five scandal.	
Polly Peck	United Kingdom	30 Oct 1990	Electronics, food, textiles	After a raid by the UK Serious Fraud Office in September 1990, the share price collapsed. The CEO Asil Nadir was convicted of stealing the company's money.	
Bank of Credit & Commerce International	United Kingdom	5 July 1991	Banking	Breach of US law, by owning another bank. Fraud, money laundering and larceny. Better known as BCCI.	
Nordbanken	Sweden	1991	Banking	Following market deregulation, there was a housing price bubble, and it burst. As part of a general rescue as the 1990–1994 Swedish financial crisis unfolded, Nordbanken was nationalised for 64 billion kronor. It was later merged with Götabanken, which itself had to write off 37.3% of its creditors, and is now known as Nordea.	
Barings Bank	United Kingdom	26 Feb 1995	Banking	An employee in Singapore, Nick Leeson, traded futures, signed off on his own accounts and became increasingly indebted. The London directors were subsequently disqualified, as being unfit to run a company in Re Barings plc (No 5).	
Bre-X	Canada	1997	Mining	After widespread reports that Bre-X had found a gold mine in Indonesia, the stories were found to be fraudulent.	
Livent	Canada	November 1998	Entertainment	In November 1998, Livent sought bankruptcy protection in the US and Canada, claiming a debt of $334 million. Garth Drabinsky, co-founder of Livent, was convicted and sentenced to prison for fraud and forgery. A judgment has been obtained against Deloitte & Touche in respect of Deloitte's negligence in conducting the audit for Livent's 1997 fiscal year.	
Long-Term Capital Management	United States	23 Sep 1998	Hedge fund	After purporting to have discovered a scientific method of calculating derivative prices, LTCM lost $4.6bn in the first few months of 1998, and was rescued by a private sector consortium.	$3.6 billion
FlowTex	Germany	February 2000	Machinery	FlowTex operated a Ponzi scheme in which non-existing construction equipment was sold to investors in order to immediately be leased back by FlowTex. This required an exponentially growing number of investors to afford the lease payments. The fraud was the largest corporate scandal in German history and caused financial damages of about 4.9bn DM (≈€3.3bn).	
Equitable Life Assurance Society	United Kingdom	8 Dec 2000	Insurance	The insurance company's directors unlawfully used money from people holding guaranteed annuity rate policies to subsidise people with current annuity rate policies. After a House of Lords judgment in Equitable Life Assurance Society v Hyman, the Society closed. Though never technically insolvent, the UK government set up a compensation scheme for policyholders under the Equitable Life (Payments) Act 2010.	
CINAR	Canada	March 2001	Animation	Micheline Charest and Ronald Weinberg, the co-founders of this animation studio, were accused of transferring over $120 million to the Bahamas without the approval of its board of directors. The company was later sold in 2004 to a consortium that includes Nelvana founder Michael Hirsch and was subsequently renamed Cookie Jar Group. Cookie Jar in turn was acquired in 2012 by what is now called WildBrain. In 2016, Weinberg was sentenced to 8 years and 11 months in prison, and is currently on parole.	
HIH Insurance	Australia	15 March 2001	Insurance	In early 2000, after an increase in the size of the business, it was determined that the insurance company's solvency was marginal, and a small asset price change could see the insurance company become insolvent. It did. Director Rodney Adler, CEO Ray Williams and others were sentenced to prison for fraudulent activity.	
Pacific Gas & Electric Company	United States	6 April 2001	Energy	After a change in regulation in California, PG&E determined it was unable to continue delivering power, and despite the California Public Utilities Commission's efforts, it went into bankruptcy, leaving homes without energy. It emerged again in 2004.	
One.Tel	Australia	29 May 2001	Telecomms	After becoming one of the largest Australian public companies, losses of $290m were reported, the share price crashed, and it entered administration. In ASIC v Rich the directors were found not to have been guilty of negligence.	
Swissair	Switzerland	2 Oct 2001	Aviation	Overexpansion in the late 1990s and the aftermath of the September 11 attacks led to a dramatic fall in share prices. In 2007, several of the company's board members were charged over the airline's bankruptcy. Assets were taken over by subsidiary Crossair which became Swiss International Air Lines, eventually purchased by Lufthansa of Germany.	
Enron	United States	28 Nov 2001	Energy	See also: Enron scandal Directors and executives fraudulently concealed large losses in Enron's projects. A number were sentenced to prison.	$63.4 billion
Chiquita Brands Int	United States	28 Nov 2001	Food	Accumulated debts, after a series of accusations relating to breaches of labour and environmental standards. It entered a pre-packaged insolvency, and emerged with similar management in 2002.	
Kmart	United States	22 Jan 2002	Retail	After difficult competition, the store was put into Chapter 11 bankruptcy proceedings, but soon re-emerged.	
Adelphia Communications	United States	13 Feb 2002	Cable television	Internal corruption. The Directors were sentenced to prison.	
Arthur Andersen	United States	15 June 2002	Accounting	A US court convicted Andersen of obstruction of justice by shredding documents relating to the Enron scandal.	
WorldCom	United States	21 July 2002	Telecomms	See also: WorldCom scandal After falling share prices, and a failed share buy back scheme, it was found that the directors had used fraudulent accounting methods to push up the stock price. Rebranded MCI, it emerged from bankruptcy in 2004 and the assets were bought by Verizon.	
Parmalat	Italy	24 Dec 2003	Food	The company's finance directors concealed large debts.	
MG Rover Group	United Kingdom	15 April 2005	Automobiles	After diminishing demand, and getting a £6.5m loan from the UK government in April 2005, the company went into administration. After the loss of 30,000 jobs, Nanjing Automobile Group bought the company's assets.	
Bayou Hedge Fund Group	United States	29 Sep 2005	Hedge fund	Samuel Israel III defrauded his investors into thinking there were higher returns, and orchestrated fake audits. The Commodity Futures Trading Commission filed a court complaint and the business was shut down after the directors were caught attempting to send $100m into overseas bank accounts.	
Refco	United States	17 Oct 2005	Broker	After becoming a public company in August 2005, it was revealed that Phillip R. Bennett, the company's CEO and chairman, had concealed $430m of bad debts. Its underwriters were Credit Suisse First Boston, Goldman Sachs, and Bank of America Corp. The company entered Chapter 11 and Bennett was sentenced to 16 years in prison.	
Bear Stearns	United States	14 Mar 2008	Banking	Bear Stearns invested in the subprime mortgage market in 2003 after the US government had begun to deregulate consumer protection and derivative trading. The business collapsed as more people began to be unable to meet mortgage obligations. After a stock price high of $172 a share, it was bought by JPMorgan Chase for $2 a share on 16 March 2008, with a $29bn loan facility guaranteed by the US Federal Reserve.	
Northern Rock	United Kingdom	22 Feb 2008	Banking	Northern Rock had invested in the international markets for sub-prime mortgage debt, and as more and more people defaulted on their home loans in the US, the Rock's business collapsed. It triggered the first bank run in the UK since Overend, Gurney & Co in 1866, when it asked the UK government for assistance. It was nationalised, and then sold to Virgin Money in 2012.	
IndyMac	United States	11 July 2008	Banking	IndyMac invested heavily in Alt-A mortgages and reverse mortgages. After many of these loans failed and couldn't be sold during the U.S. subprime mortgage crisis the company had to file for Chapter 7 bankruptcy.	
Lehman Brothers	United States	15 Sep 2008	Banking	See also: Bankruptcy of Lehman Brothers Lehman Brothers' financial strategy in 2003 was to invest heavily in mortgage debt, in markets which were being deregulated from consumer protection by the US government. Losses mounted, and Lehman Brothers was forced to file for Chapter 11 bankruptcy after the US government refused to extend a loan. The collapse triggered a global financial market meltdown. Barclays, Nomura and Bain Capital purchased the assets which were not indebted.	
AIG	United States	16 Sep 2008	Insurance	Out of $441 billion worth of securities originally rated AAA, as the US sub-prime mortgage crisis unfolded, AIG found it held $57.8 billion of these products. It was forced to take a 24-month credit facility from the US Federal Reserve Board.	
Washington Mutual	United States	26 Sep 2008	Banking	Following the sub-prime mortgage crisis, there was a bank run on WaMu, and pressure from the FDIC forced closure.	
Royal Bank of Scotland Group (RBS)	United Kingdom	13 Oct 2008	Banking	Following the takeover of ABN-Amro, and the collapse of Lehman Brothers, RBS found itself insolvent as the international credit market seized up. 58% of the shares were bought by the UK government.	
ABN-Amro	Netherlands	Oct 2008	Banking	After a takeover battle between Banco Santander, Fortis and RBS, ABN-Amro was split up and divided between the banking consortium. Fortis and RBS were found to be heavily indebted due to the sub-prime mortgage crisis. Fortis was split and the Dutch part of Fortis was taken under government ownership by The Netherlands, thus reinstating the company in ABN-Amro The Belgian part was taken over by BNP-Paribas. RBS was taken under government ownership by the UK.	
Bernard L. Madoff Investment Securities	United States	Dec 2008	Securities	Tricked investors out of $64.8 billion through the largest Ponzi scheme in history. Investors were paid returns out of their own money or that of other investors rather than from profits. Bernie Madoff told his sons about his scheme and they reported him to the SEC. He was arrested the next day.	$64.8 billion
Bankwest	Australia	2008	Banking	Following the purchase of Bankwest by the Commonwealth Bank (CBA), there have been calls for a royal commission specifically into the conduct of the bank following allegations made that the CBA engineered defaults of Bankwest customers in order to profit from clawback clauses under the purchase agreement.	
Nortel	Canada	14 Jan 2009	Telecomms	Following the 2008 financial crisis, and allegations over excessive executive pay, demand for products dropped.	$11.6 billion
Anglo Irish Bank	Ireland	15 Jan 2009	Banking	After the 2008 financial crisis, the bank was forced to be nationalised by the Irish government.	
Arcandor	Germany	9 June 2009	Retail	After struggling to maintain business levels at its brand names Karstadt and KaDeWe, Arcandor sought help from the German government, and then filed for insolvency.	
Hypo Real Estate	Germany	5 October 2009	Banking	Depfa, one of the companies subsidiaries ran into liquidity problems in 2008 as a result of the 2008 financial crisis. This combined with heavy losses reported by Hypo Real Estate itself led to a bailout by the Deutsche Bundesbank and later to a complete nationalization of the company.	
Schlecker	Germany	23 Jan 2012	Retail	After continual losses mounting from 2011 Schlecker, with 52,000 employees, was forced into insolvency, though continued to run.	
Dynegy	United States	6 July 2012	Energy	After a series of attempted takeover bids, and a finding of fraud in a subsidiary's purchase of another subsidiary, it filed for Chapter 11 bankruptcy. It emerged from bankruptcy on 2 October 2012.	
China Medical Technologies (CMED)	Cayman Islands	27 July 2012	Medical technology	In 2009, an anonymous letter alleging possible illegal and fraudulent activities by management since 2007 was sent to KPMG Hong Kong, then CMED's auditor, and investigated by law firm Paul Weiss Rifkind Wharton & Garrison. Since 27 July 2012, pursuant to an Order by the Grand Court of the Cayman Islands, CMED has been under the control of Joint Official Liquidators. Post-bankruptcy filing, CMED's liquidator found itself probing an alleged $355 million insider fraud. In March 2017, the U.S. Department of Justice criminally indicted the CMED founder and CEO, as well as the former Chief Financial Officer, charging them with securities fraud and wire fraud conspiracy for stealing more than $400 million from investors as part of a seven-year scheme.	
National Bank of Anguilla and Caribbean Commercial Bank	Anguilla	12 August 2013	Banking	In 2013, the two indigenous banks of Anguilla were intervened in by the East Caribbean Central Bank due to alleged irregular loan practices. After 3 years, both banks were put into bankruptcy, a new nationalized bank was created and the assets of the two bankrupt banks and the bank accounts of local account holders were transferred to the new bank and the local depositors were made whole by stealing about $180 million of money belonging foreign depositors, who lost their entire savings. The central bank was accused of fleecing foreign depositors.	
Banco Espírito Santo (BES)	Portugal	3 August 2014	Banking	An audit performed in 2013, for a capital raise performed in May 2014, uncovered severe financial irregularities and a precarious financial situation of the bank. In July 2014, Salgado was replaced by economist Vítor Bento, who saw BES in an irrecoverable situation. Its good assets were bought by Novo Banco, a vehicle founded by Portugal's financial regulators for that purpose, on August 3, which hired Bento as CEO, while its toxic assets stayed in the "old" BES, which got its banking license revoked by Portugal's regulators.	
Dick Smith	Australia	5 January 2016	Retail	On 5 January 2016, the retailer collapsed and was placed into receivership. McGrathNicol were appointed as administrators by the company's board and Ferrier Hodgson appointed by the company's major creditors National Australia Bank (NAB) and HSBC Bank Australia.	
Theranos	United States	September 2018	Health care	Theranos claimed to have developed devices to automate and miniaturize blood tests using microscopic blood volumes. Theranos dubbed its blood collection vessel the "nanotainer" and its analysis machine the "Edison". Elizabeth Holmes, founder and CEO, reportedly named the device "Edison" after inventor Thomas Edison, stating, "We tried everything else and it failed, so let's call it the Edison." This was likely because of a well-known Edison quote: "I've not failed. I've just found 10,000 ways that won't work."	
Wirecard	Germany	June 2020	Banking, Money transfer	€1.9 billion, which apparently never existed, was found missing in a special audit. The CEO was arrested, the board filed for insolvency, and a warrant for the missing COO was issued.	
S Alam Group	Bangladesh (Chairman Mohammed Saiful Alam)	November 2025 (case filed)	Conglomerate (banking, sugar, steel, power)	Businessman Mohammed Saiful Alam and 66 others, including family members and bank officials, were charged by the Anti-Corruption Commission with embezzling Tk 9,283.93 crore (approx. US$1 billion) from Islami Bank Bangladesh through fraudulent loans and laundering the funds to Singapore, the British Virgin Islands and Cyprus. A Cypriot court froze a property of Alam in May 2026 after a request from Bangladesh. The Bangladesh High Court suspended Alam's renunciation of Bangladeshi citizenship in November 2025, keeping him a citizen.	
FTX	Bahamas	November 2022	Cryptocurrency, Cryptocurrency exchange	See also: Bankruptcy of FTX CEO Sam Bankman-Fried resigns and FTX (company) files for Chapter 11 bankruptcy. John J. Ray III, the same attorney who oversaw the liquidation of Enron, is appointed CEO.	
Silicon Valley Bank (SVB)	United States	March 2023	Banking	See also: Collapse of Silicon Valley Bank Silicon Valley Bank lost money on bonds, prompting a run on the bank. The FDIC placed the bank into receivership, and its US assets were acquired by First Citizens BancShares and its UK assets were acquired by HSBC.	
Signature Bank	United States	March 2023	Banking	Due to losses and a bank run, prompted by the preceding collapse of Silicon Valley Bank, the FDIC placed the bank into receivership.	
First Republic Bank	United States	May 2023	Banking	Due to a global banking panic, mainly from the preceding collapses of Silicon Valley Bank and Signature Bank, a bank run forced the bank to be placed into receivership by the FDIC and then sold to JPMorgan Chase	
Signa Holding	Austria	November 2023	Real Estate, Retail	The company collapsed in 2023 with €23 billion ($25 billion) of insolvencies.	
VShojo	United States	24 July 2025	Entertainment	VShojo announced that it would be ceasing operations in July 2025 following allegations that it mishandled money intended for charity, leading to all of its talents cutting ties with the company.	

== List of scandals without insolvency ==
- Australia & New Zealand Banking Group scandal involving misleading file notes in the Financial Ombudsman Service (Australia) presented to the Supreme Court of Victoria.
- Australia & New Zealand Banking Group allegations of racial bigotry toward billionaire businessman Pankaj Oswal and his wife. Court was presented with emails where an ANZ staff member comments to ANZ CEO Mike Smith: "We are dealing with Indians with no moral compass and an Indian woman as every bit as devious as PO (Mr Oswal)."
- Australia & New Zealand Banking Group toxic culture. Court case where allegations were made by ex-employees that the bank's senior management tolerated drugs and strip clubs.
- Australia & New Zealand Banking Group alleged manipulation of the Australian benchmark interest rates. ANZ is currently being pursued by the Australian Securities & Investments Commission, which filed an originating process in the Federal Court of Australia against ANZ in March 2016.
- BAE Systems bribery scandal related to the Al-Yamamah arms deal with Saudi Arabia
- Bristol-Myers Squibb accounting scandal
- British Airways, for the "Dirty Tricks" scandal against Virgin Atlantic
- Brown & Williamson, for chemically enhancing the addictiveness of cigarettes, becoming the leading edge of the tobacco industry scandals of the 1990s, eventually resulting in the Tobacco Master Settlement Agreement
- Chevron-Texaco Lago Agrio oil field pollution scandal
- Commonwealth Bank facts uncovered that showed the insurance arm of the bank denied life insurance policyholders despite having legitimate claims, resulting in calls for a Royal Commission into the Australian insurance industry.
- Commonwealth Bank provision of unsuitable financial advice to a large number of customers between 2003 and 2012 and continuous delay in providing compensation to victims.
- Compass Group, bribed the United Nations in order to win business
- Corrib gas controversy Kilcommon, Erris, Co. Mayo, Ireland
- Deutsche Bank, spying scandal
- Deutsche Bank Libor scandal, agreed to a combined US$2.5 billion in fines
- Duke Energy
- El Paso Corp.
- Fannie Mae, underreporting of profit
- Firestone Tire & Rubber Company, part of the General Motors streetcar conspiracy, labor controversies, Firestone and Ford tire controversy
- Forced labour under German rule during World War II, financial enrichment by several major companies
- Ford Pinto, fuel tank scandal
- Financial Ombudsman Service (Australia) scandal involving misleading file notes in the Financial Ombudsman Service (Australia) presented to the Victorian Supreme Court.
- Global Crossing
- Guinness share-trading fraud
- Hafskip's collapse
- Halliburton overcharging government contracts
- Harken Energy Scandal
- HealthSouth reporting exaggerated earnings
- Hewlett-Packard spying scandal
- Hospital Corporation of America
- Homestore.com
- KBC Bank human rights scandal
- Kerr-McGee, the Karen Silkwood case
- Kinney National Company financial scandal
- Lernout & Hauspie accounting fraud
- Lockheed bribery scandal in Germany, Japan, and the Netherlands
- Livedoor scandal
- Luxembourg Leaks. Luxembourg under Jean-Claude Juncker's premiership had turned into a major European centre of corporate tax avoidance.
- Marsh McLennan
- Merck Medicaid fraud investigation
- Mirant
- Morrison-Knudsen scandal. Led to William Agee's ouster
- Mutual-fund scandal (2003)
- Nestlé
- Nugan Hand Bank
- Olympus Scandal
- Options backdating involving over 100 companies
- Pacific Gas & Electric Company, 2017 California wildfires, 2018 California wildfires
- Panama Papers International. Leak of hundreds of thousands of confidential documents pertaining to the bank accounts and companies held by politicians, High-net-worth individuals and other people, some in off-shore tax havens. The focus was Panama law firm Mossack Fonseca.
- Paradise Papers leak
- Peregrine Systems corporate executives convicted of accounting fraud
- Phar-Mor company lied to shareholders. CEO was eventually sentenced to prison for fraud and the company eventually became bankrupt
- Qwest Communications
- RadioShack CEO David Edmondson lied about attaining a B.A. degree from Pacific Coast Baptist College in California
- Reliant Energy
- Rite Aid accounting fraud
- Royal Dutch Shell overstated its oil reserves twice, it downgraded 3,900,000,000 barrels (620,000,000 m^{3}), or about 20 percent of its total holdings.
- S-Chips Scandals, Singapore
- Satyam Computers, India
- 7-Eleven Australia. Allegations of bullying tactics, underpayment of wages and entitlements.
- Siemens Greek bribery scandal, involving cases of bribery on behalf of Siemens towards the Greek Government
- Société Générale, derivatives trading scandal causing multibillion-euro losses
- Southwest Airlines, violations of safety regulations
- SunTrust Banks, "claims of shoddy mortgage lending, servicing and foreclosure practices."
- Tesla, involving "420 funding secured" private buyout scheme resulting in fraud charges against CEO Elon Musk
- Tyco International, executive theft and prison sentence
- Union Carbide, the Bhopal disaster
- ValuJet, loading live oxygen generators into cargo hold of a passenger jet causing a fatal crash
- Volkswagen emissions violations, fraud in diesel motors pollution measurements
- David Wittig "looting" scandals
- Xerox alleged accounting irregularities involving auditor KPMG, causing restatement of financial results for the years 1997 through 2000 and fines for both companies

== See also ==
- List of bank failures in the United States (2008–present)
- List of largest U.S. bank failures
- List of sovereign defaults
- List of stock market crashes and bear markets
- List of UK businesses entering administration during 2008–2009 financial crisis
- List of accounting scandals
- List of defunct airlines
- Agency cost
- Corporate crime
- Global settlement
- Subprime mortgage crisis
- White collar crime
