= Jodee Rich =

Australian businessman (born 1960)

- Born: 1 February 1960 (age 66); New York City
- Education: Cranbrook School
- Alma mater: University of Sydney
- Occupation: Entrepreneur
- Board member of: Imagineering Australia; One.Tel; PeopleBrowsr
- Spouse(s): Maxine Rich, née Brenner
- Parents: Steven Rich AM; Gail Rich
- Website: JDR.CEO

John David "Jodee" Rich (born 1960) is an Australian businessman. He was a founder of the defunct mobile phone provider One.Tel and the software distributor Imagineering Australia. He is now the CEO and founder of social analytics and influence measurement provider PeopleBrowsr and the creator of new TLDs dotCEO, dotBest and dotKred.

== Background and education ==
Rich was born to a German Jewish father, Steven Rich, who, in 1963, settled in Australia to manage Hunter Douglas, a Venetian blind manufacturer, and his wife, Gail, born in Australia. Steven Rich went on to create the Traveland travel agency, was the deputy chairman of the Salvation Army in 1971 and was awarded an Order of Australia in 2001. Steven Rich subsequently created Focus Publishing.

Rich wrote his first software program on punch cards in 1972 at the age of 12. He was educated at Cranbrook School in Bellevue Hill, Sydney. During his Cranbrook days Rich started a business renting fish tanks. At Cranbrook he met Rodney Adler, who would go on to become a director of One.Tel. In 1980 Rich developed a commodity analysis system on 64k Apple II, which he later sold to investment banks. He studied accounting, Economics and Computer Science at University of Sydney, graduating in 1981 with a Bachelor of Economics.

In 1987, Rich married Maxine Brenner, a corporate lawyer who has sat on the board of a public company, Neverfail Springwater, and has served as a member of the Takeovers Panel, a government body involved in the resolution of sharemarket disputes.

== Corporate achievements ==
=== Imagineering ===
In 1981, Rich launched Imagineering Australia and the company was floated in 1987. Shares in Imagineering peaked at $8 but the company sold to a Hong Kong group for 10c a share in 1990.

=== One.Tel ===
Rich formed One.Tel, a service provider of GSM mobile and long-distance calls, in Australia in 1995 (with James Packer as a shareholder) competing against Telstra and Optus. The company acquired a GSM operation for $500 million in 2000. One.Tel Australia was placed in administration in May 2001. One.Tel UK was sold to Centrica for $200 million and later to Carphone Warehouse who retired the brand in favour of its TalkTalk brand.

Beginning in December 2001, Rich was the defendant in legal proceedings brought by the Australian Securities and Investments Commission (ASIC). During the case, known as ASIC v Rich, Rich was in the witness box for over 33 days. Justice Austin later said in his judgment Rich "demonstrated that he was a very well prepared witness, knowledgeable about the subject matter of his evidence, who responded to questions thoughtfully and clearly, sometimes even perceptively. This was notwithstanding the arduous circumstances of his cross examination, extending over 25 days".

Rich was exonerated on 18 November 2009 when Justice Robert Austin ruled that ASIC had "failed to prove any aspect of its pleaded case."

=== Other business achievements ===
In 2007, Rich founded PeopleBrowsr. In 2011, PeopleBrowsr launched Kred Influence Measurement.

On 27 March 2013, Rich launched the TLD dotCEO. It is marketed to CEOs.

== See also ==
- ASIC v Rich
