= Financial scandal =

Financial scandal may refer to:

- Corporate scandal
- Accounting scandals, or corporate accounting scandals, political and business scandals
  - Disclosure of expenses of Members of the United Kingdom Parliament
