= List of acts of the Parliament of Victoria from 2001 =

This is a list of acts of the Parliament of Victoria, Australia for the year 2001.

== 2001 ==
Short title, or popular name	Citation	Royal assent
Long title
Health Services (Amendment) Act 2001	No. 1 of 2001	27 March 2001
An Act to amend the Health Services Act 1988 (Note: Health Services Act 1988 (No. 49 of 1988)) to provide for elected and appointed members of boards of community health centres and for other purposes.
Health Records Act 2001	No. 2 of 2001	10 April 2001
An Act to establish a regime for the protection of health information held by health service providers and other organisations, to create an enforceable right of access to health information, to establish privacy standards for health information, to amend the Parliamentary Committees Act 1968, (Note: Parliamentary Committees Act 1968 (No. 7727)) the Ombudsman Act 1973, (Note: Ombudsman Act 1973 (No. 8414)) the Freedom of Information Act 1982, (Note: Freedom of Information Act 1982 (No. 9859)) the Health Services (Conciliation and Review) Act 1987, (Note: Health Services (Conciliation and Review) Act 1987 (No. 25 of 1987)) the Subordinate Legislation Act 1994 (Note: Subordinate Legislation Act 1994 (No. 104 of 1994)) and certain other Acts and for other purposes.
Land (Further Revocation of Reservations) Act 2001	No. 3 of 2001	10 April 2001
An Act to provide for the revocation of the reservations over several parcels of land, the revocation of a Crown grant and for other purposes.
Parliamentary Precincts Act 2001	No. 4 of 2001	10 April 2001
An Act to provide for the control, management and security of the Parliamentary precincts, to repeal certain provisions in the Unlawful Assemblies and Processions Act 1958, (Note: Unlawful Assemblies and Processions Act 1958 (No. 6406)) to amend the Parliamentary Committees Act 1968 and the Road Safety Act 1986 (Note: Road Safety Act 1986 (No. 127 of 1986)) and for other purposes.
City of Melbourne Act 2001	No. 5 of 2001	8 May 2001
An Act to alter the electoral structure of the City of Melbourne, to provide for the direct election of a Lord Mayor and a Deputy Lord Mayor, to facilitate an early election of the members of the Melbourne City Council and for other purposes.
Corporations (Commonwealth Powers) Act 2001	No. 6 of 2001	8 May 2001
An Act to refer certain matters relating to corporations and financial products and services to the Parliament of the Commonwealth for the purposes of section 51(xxxvii) of the Constitution of the Commonwealth, to amend section 85 of the Constitution Act 1975 (Note: Constitution Act 1975 (No. 8750)) and for other purposes.
Environment Protection (Liveable Neighbourhoods) Act 2001	No. 7 of 2001	
Forestry Rights (Amendment) Act 2001	No. 8 of 2001	
Police Regulation (Miscellaneous Amendments) Act 2001	No. 9 of 2001	
State Taxation Acts (Further Miscellaneous Amendments) Act 2001	No. 10 of 2001	
Statute Law Amendment (Authorised Deposit-taking Institutions) Act 2001	No. 11 of 2001	
Constitution (Supreme Court) Act 2001	No. 12 of 2001	
Electricity Industry Acts (Further Amendment) Act 2001	No. 13 of 2001	
Food (Amendment) Act 2001	No. 14 of 2001	
Professional Boxing and Martial Arts (Amendment) Act 2001	No. 15 of 2001	
Racing and Betting Acts (Amendment) Act 2001	No. 16 of 2001	
Benefit Associations (Repeal) Act 2001	No. 17 of 2001	
Health Services (Health Purchasing Victoria) Act 2001	No. 18 of 2001	
Judicial and Other Pensions Legislation (Amendment) Act 2001	No. 19 of 2001	
Judicial College of Victoria Act 2001	No. 20 of 2001	
Liquor Control Reform (Amendment) Act 2001	No. 21 of 2001	
Prostitution Control (Proscribed Brothels) Act 2001	No. 22 of 2001	
Road Safety (Alcohol and Drugs Enforcement Measures) Act 2001	No. 23 of 2001	
State Owned Enterprises (Amendment) Act 2001	No. 24 of 2001	
Water (Amendment) Act 2001	No. 25 of 2001	
House Contracts Guarantee (HIH) Act 2001 (repealed)	No. 26 of 2001	7 June 2001
An Act to amend the House Contracts Guarantee Act 1987 (Note: House Contracts Guarantee Act 1987 (No. 44 of 1987)) to establish an indemnity scheme in respect of certain classes of domestic building work affected by the collapse of the HIH Insurance Group, (Note: HIH Insurance.) to amend the Building Act 1993, (Note: Building Act 1993 (No. 126 of 1993)) the Domestic Building Contracts Act 1995 (Note: Domestic Building Contracts and Tribunal Act 1995 (No. 91 of 1995)) and the Sale of Land Act 1962 (Note: Sale of Land Act 1962 (No. 6975)) and for other purposes. (Repealed by Statute Law Repeals Act 2012 (No. 30 of 2012))
Statute Law Amendment (Relationships) Act 2001	No. 27 of 2001	
Tobacco (Further Amendment) Act 2001	No. 28 of 2001	
Urban Land Corporation (Amendment) Act 2001	No. 29 of 2001	
Building (Single Dwellings) Act 2001	No. 30 of 2001	
Gas Industry Act 2001	No. 31 of 2001	19 June 2001
An Act to regulate the gas industry and for other purposes.
Gas Industry Legislation (Miscellaneous Amendments) Act 2001	No. 32 of 2001	19 June 2001
Health (Amendment) Act 2001	No. 33 of 2001	19 June 2001
Post Compulsory Education Acts (Amendment) Act 2001	No. 34 of 2001	19 June 2001
Racing (Racing Victoria Ltd) Act 2001	No. 35 of 2001	19 June 2001
An Act to amend the Racing Act 1958 (Note: Racing Act 1958 (No. 6353)) to provide for the recognition of a body to be responsible for the carrying out of certain powers and functions relating to horse racing and to confer powers and functions on that body and for other purposes.
Whistleblowers Protection Act 2001 (repealed)	No. 36 of 2001	19 June 2001
An Act to encourage and facilitate disclosures of improper conduct by public officers and public bodies, to protect persons making those disclosures and others from reprisals, to provide for the matters disclosed to be properly investigated and dealt with and for other purposes. (Repealed by Protected Disclosure Act 2012 (No. 85 of 2012))
Appropriation (2001/2002) Act 2001 (repealed)	No. 37 of 2001	27 June 2001
An Act for the appropriation of certain sums out of the Consolidated Fund in respect of the financial year 2001/2002 and for other purposes. (Repealed by Statute Law (Further Revision) Act 2006 (No. 29 of 2006))
Appropriation (Parliament 2001/2002) Act 2001 (repealed)	No. 38 of 2001	27 June 2001
An Act for the appropriation of certain sums out of the Consolidated Fund for the Parliament in respect of the financial year 2001/2002 and for other purposes. (Repealed by Statute Law (Further Revision) Act 2006 (No. 29 of 2006))
Agricultural and Veterinary Chemicals (Victoria) (Amendment) Act 2001	No. 39 of 2001	27 June 2001
Constitution (Metropolitan Ambulance Service Royal Commission Report) Act 2001	No. 40 of 2001	27 June 2001
An Act to amend the Constitution Act 1975 to make provision for the publication of the report of the Metropolitan Ambulance Service Royal Commission and for other purposes.
Co-operative Schemes (Administrative Actions) Act 2001	No. 41 of 2001	27 June 2001
An Act relating to administrative actions taken by Commonwealth authorities or officers of the Commonwealth under the Agricultural and Veterinary Chemicals (Victoria) Act 1994 (Note: Agricultural and Veterinary Chemicals (Victoria) Act 1994 (?)) and other State co-operative scheme laws, to amend the Parliamentary Committees Act 1968 and for other purposes.
Corporations (Administrative Actions) Act 2001	No. 42 of 2001	27 June 2001
Corporations (Ancillary Provisions) Act 2001	No. 43 of 2001	27 June 2001
An Act to enact ancillary provisions relating to the enactment by the Parliament of the Commonwealth of new corporations legislation and new ASIC legislation and for other purposes.
Corporations (Consequential Amendments) Act 2001	No. 44 of 2001	27 June 2001
Corrections (Custody) Act 2001	No. 45 of 2001	27 June 2001
Duties (Amendment) Act 2001	No. 46 of 2001	27 June 2001
Racial and Religious Tolerance Act 2001 (repealed)	No. 47 of 2001	27 June 2001
An Act to promote racial and religious tolerance by prohibiting the vilification of persons on the ground of race or religious belief or activity, to amend the Equal Opportunity Act 1995 (Note: Equal Opportunity Act 1995 (No. 42 of 1995)) and for other purposes. (Repealed by Justice Legislation Amendment (Anti-vilification and Social Cohesion) Act 2025 (No. 11 of 2025))
State Taxation Acts (Taxation Reform Implementation) Act 2001	No. 48 of 2001	27 June 2001
Transfer of Land (Amendment) Act 2001	No. 49 of 2001	27 June 2001
Victorian Managed Insurance Authority (Amendment) Act 2001	No. 50 of 2001	27 June 1001
An Act to amend the Victorian Managed Insurance Authority Act 1996 (Note: Victorian Managed Insurance Authority Act 1996 (No. 11 of 1996)) and the Financial Management Act 1994 (Note: Financial Management Act 1994 (No. 18 of 1994)) with respect to insurance and risk management in the Victorian public sector and for other purposes.
Community Visitors Legislation (Miscellaneous Amendments) Act 2001	No. 51 of 2001	
Public Notaries Act 2001	No. 52 of 2001	25 September 2001
An Act to provide for the appointment and regulation of the practice of public notaries, to amend the Legal Practice Act 1996, (Note: Legal Practice Act 1996 (No. 35 of 1996)) the Instruments Act 1958 (Note: Instruments Act 1958 (No. 6279)) and the Evidence Act 1958 (Note: Evidence Act 1958 (No. 6246)) and for other purposes.
Agriculture Legislation (Amendment) Act 2001	No. 53 of 2001	
Transport (Further Amendment) Act 2001	No. 54 of 2001	
Agricultural and Veterinary Chemicals (Control of Use) (Further Amendment) Act 2001	No. 55 of 2001	
Business Investigations (Repeal) Act 2001	No. 56 of 2001	
Commonwealth Games Arrangements Act 2001	No. 57 of 2001	16 October 2001
An Act to facilitate preparations for the Commonwealth Games to be held in Melbourne in 2006, to amend the Melbourne Cricket Ground Act 1933, (Note: Melbourne Cricket Ground Act 1933 (No. 4149)) the State Sport Centres Act 1994 (Note: Melbourne Sports and Aquatic Centre Act 1994 (No. 117 of 1994)) and the Project Development and Construction Management Act 1994 (Note: Project Development and Construction Management Act 1994 (No. 101 of 1994)) and for other purposes.
Crimes (Validation of Orders) Act 2001	No. 58 of 2001	
Infertility Treatment (Amendment) Act 2001	No. 59 of 2001	
Trustee (Amendment) Act 2001	No. 60 of 2001	
Drugs, Poisons and Controlled Substances (Amendment) Act 2001	No. 61 of 2001	
Essential Services Commission Act 2001	No. 62 of 2001	23 October 2001
An Act to establish the Essential Services Commission, to repeal the Office of the Regulator-General Act 1994 (Note: Office of the Regulator-General Act 1994 (No. 42 of 1994)) and consequentially amend certain other Acts and for other purposes.
Retail Tenancies Reform (Amendment) Act 2001	No. 63 of 2001	23 October 2001
Roman Catholic Trusts (Amendment) Act 2001	No. 64 of 2001	23 October 2001
An Act to amend the Roman Catholic Trusts Act 1907 (Note: Roman Catholic Trusts Act 1907 (7 Edw. VII. No. 2100)) with respect to the administration of trusts and for other purposes.
Telecommunications (Interception) (State Provisions) (Amendment) Act 2001	No. 65 of 2001	
Victorian Arts Centre (Amendment) Act 2001	No. 66 of 2001	
Gene Technology Act 2001	No. 67 of 2001	
Building (Amendment) Act 2001	No. 68 of 2001	
Classification (Publications, Films and Computer Games) (Enforcement) (Amendment) Act 2001	No. 69 of 2001	
Fundraising Appeals (Amendment) Act 2001	No. 70 of 2001	
Mineral Resources Development (Further Amendment) Act 2001	No. 71 of 2001	
Statute Law Further Amendment (Relationships) Act 2001	No. 72 of 2001	
Unclaimed Moneys and Superannuation Legislation (Amendment) Act 2001	No. 73 of 2001	
Marine Safety Legislation (Lakes Hume and Mulwala) Act 2001	No. 74 of 2001	
Health Services (Conciliation and Review) (Amendment) Act 2001	No. 75 of 2001	
Legal Aid (Amendment) Act 2001	No. 76 of 2001	
Marine (Further Amendment) Act 2001	No. 77 of 2001	
Melbourne City Link (Further Amendment) Act 2001	No. 78 of 2001	
State Taxation Legislation (Amendment) Act 2001	No. 79 of 2001	
Sentencing (Emergency Service Costs) Act 2001	No. 80 of 2001	
Victorian Environmental Assessment Council Act 2001	No. 81 of 2001	4 December 2001
An Act to establish the Victorian Environmental Assessment Council, to repeal the Environment Conservation Council Act 1997 (Note: Environment Conservation Council Act 1997 (No. 41 of 1997)) and for other purposes.
Accident Compensation (Amendment) Act 2001	No. 82 of 2001	
Animals Legislation (Responsible Ownership) Act 2001	No. 83 of 2001	
Auction Sales (Repeal) Act 2001	No. 84 of 2001	
Energy Legislation (Miscellaneous Amendments) Act 2001	No. 85 of 2001	
Fair Trading (Unconscionable Conduct) Act 2001 (repealed)	No. 86 of 2001	11 December 2001
An Act to amend the Fair Trading Act 1999 (Note: Fair Trading Act 1999 (No. 16 of 1999)) and for other purposes. (Repealed by Statute Law (Further Revision) Act 2006 (No. 29 of 2006))
Film Act 2001	No. 87 of 2001	
Liquor Control Reform (Prohibited Products) Act 2001	No. 88 of 2001	
Livestock Disease Control (Amendment) Act 2001	No. 89 of 2001	
Marine (Hire and Drive Vessels) Act 2001	No. 90 of 2001	
Petroleum (Submerged Lands) (Amendment) Act 2001	No. 91 of 2001	
Road Safety (Further Amendment) Act 2001	No. 92 of 2001	
Second-Hand Dealers and Pawnbrokers (Amendment) Act 2001	No. 93 of 2001	
Transport (Alcohol and Drug Controls) Act 2001	No. 94 of 2001	
Scotch College Common Funds Act 2001	No. 95 of 2001	
Victorian Institute of Teaching Act 2001	No. 96 of 2001	18 December 2001
An Act to recognise, promote and regulate the profession of teaching and to establish the Victorian Institute of Teaching and for other purposes.

== Sources ==
- "Acts as made: 2001". Victoria Legislation.
