= Jane Hardy =

Jane Hardy may refer to:

- Jane Louisa Hardy (1828–1915), American activist and philanthropist
- Jane Hardy (diplomat), Australian diplomat and ambassador
