= Hugh Gilchrist =

Australian public servant, diplomat and author

Hugh Gilchrist OAM
- Born: 8 August 1916; Sydney, New South Wales
- Died: 16 October 2010 (aged 94)
- Education: Cranbrook School, Sydney; University of Sydney
- Occupations: Public servant, diplomat, author
- Spouse: Elizabeth Richards (m. 1949–2010)

Hugh Gilchrist OAM (8 August 1916 – 16 October 2010) was an Australian public servant, diplomat and author.

== Background and early career ==
Born in Sydney on 8 August 1916, Gilchrist was educated at Cranbrook School and the University of Sydney. Following military service during World War II, he joined the Department of External Affairs in October 1945 as second secretary in the political intelligence section.

== Career ==
Whilst Australian Ambassador to Greece between 1968 and 1972, Gilchrist developed a fascination with Greek-Australian history. Whilst living in Athens, Gilchrist heard the story of Diamantina Bowen (née di Roma), a noblewoman from Greece and later the wife of the first Governor of Queensland, George Bowen. Gilchrist's commitment to Greece and the Greek people stayed with him into his retirement, when he began researching to write the three volume Australians and Greeks. The New South Wales Migration Heritage Centre described the trilogy as containing both "definitive history... and an entertaining array of colourful characters and stories".

In 1992, the first volume of Australians and Greeks was published, The Early Years. The second volume, The Middle Years, followed in 1997. In 1998, Gilchrist was awarded the Gold Cross of St Andrew by the Greek Archdiocese of Sydney. Volume III, The Later Years, was issued in 2004.

Also during retirement Gilchrist spent four years on the Literature Board of the Australia Council for the Arts. Gilchrist died on 16 October 2010.

== Works ==
- Australians and Greeks Volume I: The Early Years, Halstead Press, 1992, ISBN 978-1-875684-01-4
- Australians and Greeks Volume II: The Middle Years, Halstead Press, 1997, ISBN 9781875684007
- Australians and Greeks Volume III: The Later Years, Halstead Press, 2004, ISBN 1920831193

== Awards ==
- National Heritage Trust Award (1994)
- Gold Cross of St Andrew (1998)
- Medal of the Order of Australia (2005)

Diplomatic posts
Preceded by A.F. Dingle as Acting High Commissioner	Australian High Commissioner to Tanzania; 1962 – 1966	Succeeded by H.W. Bullock
Preceded by Jo Gullett	Australian Ambassador to Greece; 1968 – 1972	Succeeded by Barry Hall
Preceded by Dudley McCarthy	Australian Ambassador to the Spain; 1977 – 1979	Succeeded by K.H. Rogers
