= List of ambassadors of Australia to Spain =

Ambassador of Australia to Spain

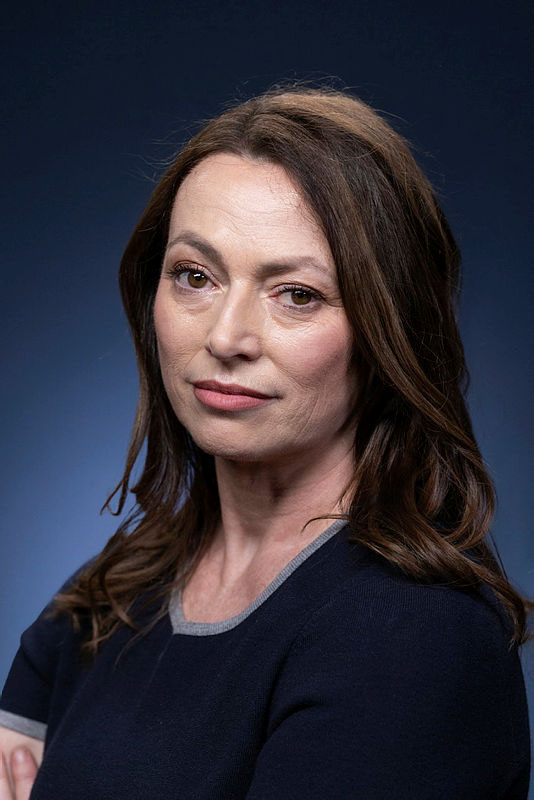
- Incumbent; Rosemary Morris-Castico since 23 April 2024
- Department of Foreign Affairs and Trade
- Style: Her Excellency
- Reports to: Minister for Foreign Affairs
- Residence: Madrid
- Nominator: Prime Minister of Australia
- Appointer: Governor General of Australia
- Inaugural holder: Lawrence John Lawrey
- Formation: 1969
- Website: Australian Embassy, Spain

The Ambassador of Australia to Spain is an officer of the Australian Department of Foreign Affairs and Trade and the head of the Embassy of the Commonwealth of Australia to the Kingdom of Spain. The ambassador resides in Madrid. The ambassador also holds non-resident accreditation as ambassador to Andorra (since 1998) and Equatorial Guinea (since 2009).

The current ambassador, since June 2020, is Sophia McIntyre.

== List of ambassadors ==
Ordinal	Officeholder	Other offices	Term start date	Term end date	Time in office	Notes
1	Lawrence John Lawrey		1969	1971	1–2 years	
2	Dudley McCarthy		1972	1976	3–4 years	
3	Hugh Gilchrist		1977	1979	1–2 years	
4	K. H. Rogers		1980	1984	3–4 years	
5	D. G. Wilson		1985	1985	0 years	
6	Harry Jenkins		1986	1988	1–2 years	
7	H. C. Mott		1989	1991	1–2 years	
8	Warwick Pearson		1992	1996	3–4 years	
9	Richard Starr	^{A}	1997	2000	2–3 years	
10	Tim George	^{A}	2000	2003	2–3 years	
11	Susan Tanner	^{A}	2003	2006	2–3 years	
12	Noel Campbell	^{A}^{B}	2006	2010	3–4 years	
13	Zorica McCarthy	^{A}^{B}	2010	2013	2–3 years	
14	Jane Hardy	^{A}^{B}	2013	2014	0–1 years	
15	Virginia Greville	^{A}^{B}	1 May 2015	25 May 2018	3 years, 24 days	
16	Julie-Ann Guivarra	^{A}^{B}	25 May 2018	January 2020	1 year, 7 months	
17	Sophia McIntyre	^{A}^{B}	26 June 2020	incumbent	6 years, 73 days	

=== Notes ===
^A Also served as non-resident Ambassador of Australia to Andorra, since 1998.
^B Also served as non-resident Ambassador of Australia to Equatorial Guinea, since 2009.
