= Sydney Medical School =

Graduate school at the University of Sydney

- Type: Public
- Established: 1856; 170 years ago
- Parent institution: University of Sydney
- Head of School and Dean: Professor Jane Bleasel
- Location: Sydney, New South Wales, Australia; 33°53′17″S 151°11′18″E
- Campus: Urban
- Website: sydney.edu.au/medicine

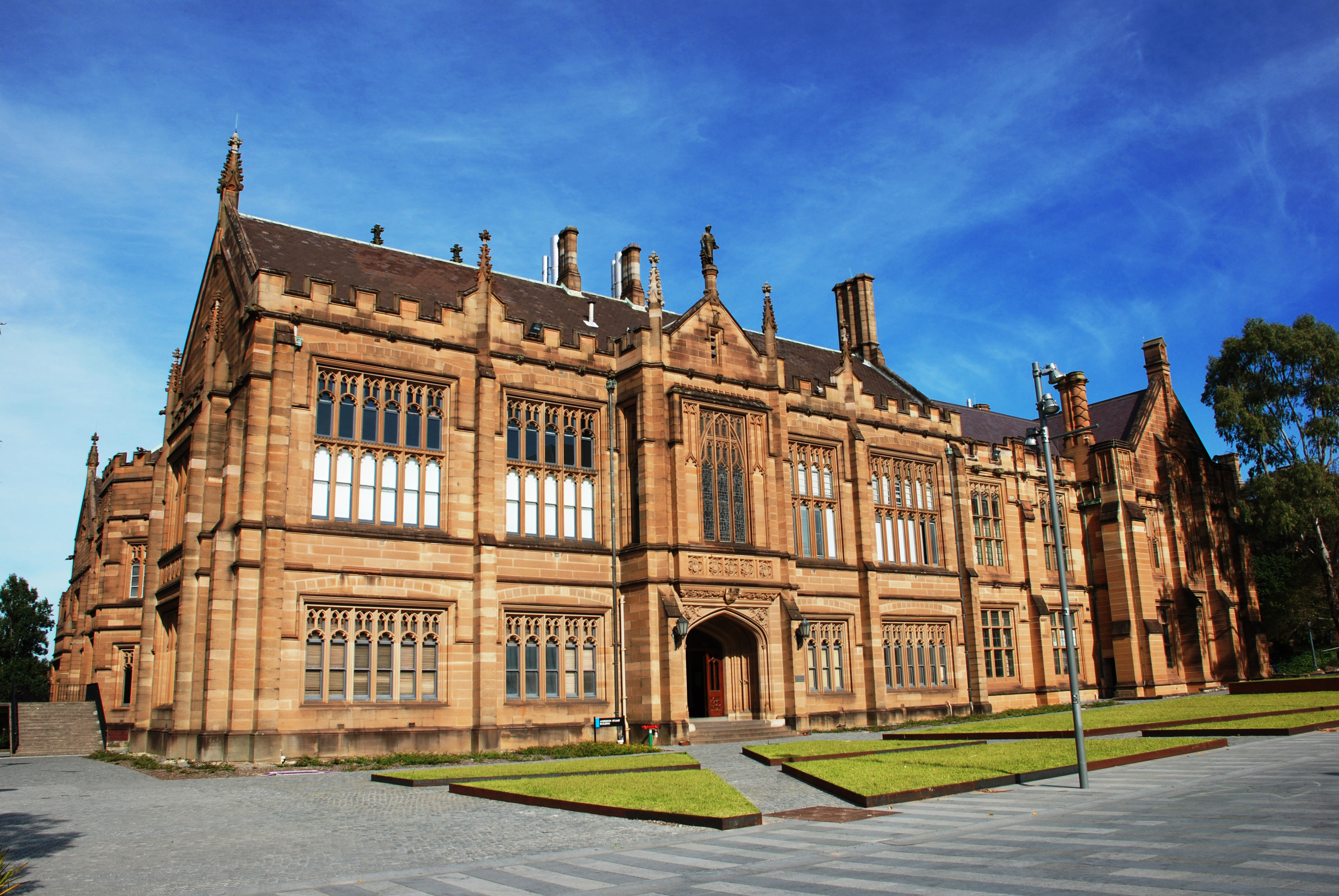
Anderson Stuart Building

Sydney Medical School Centenary Medal

The University of Sydney School of Medicine, also known as Sydney Medical School (SMS), is the graduate medical school of the University of Sydney. It was established in 1856, making it the first medical school in Australia. Sydney Medical School is ranked equal 26th in the world and second in Australia in the 2026 QS Subject Rankings for medicine.

The School has a large and diverse faculty to support its missions in education, research, and health care. Each year, it has over 1,100 medical students and 2,000 postgraduate students undertaking coursework and research-training programs.

== History ==
Sydney Medical School was established in 1856 as The University of Sydney Faculty of Medicine by a group of University of Edinburgh Medical School graduates, Thomas Peter Anderson Stuart, Charles Nicholson and Alexander McCormick.

== Sydney Medical Program ==
Sydney Medical School offers a four-year graduate medical program. Key course features include a hybrid problem-based learning model, early clinical exposure, online learning resources, and a focus on evidence-based medicine, which were modelled on aspects of the New Pathway Doctor of Medicine (MD) program at Harvard Medical School. The curriculum has won numerous teaching awards and is licensed to universities in the UK, South Africa and the Middle East and to other universities in Australia.

First introduced in 1997, the graduate medical program originally led to the degrees of Bachelor of Medicine and Bachelor of Surgery (MBBS) for historical reasons. Since 2014, the MD has replaced the MBBS as the title of the medical degree conferred by the Sydney Medical Program.

Entry into the Sydney Medical Program is on the basis of an applicant's grade point average (GPA) and Graduate Medical School Admissions Test (GAMSAT) score. International applicants may submit a GAMSAT score or Medical College Admission Test (MCAT) score with their application. Applicants who achieve a satisfactory GPA (5.0, or 4.5 for rural applicants) are ranked for admissions offers on the basis of their GAMSAT or MCAT score. Each year's cohort has approximately 300 students enrolled, an appreciable proportion of which are international students.

=== Undergraduate provisional entry ===
The School also offers an undergraduate-entry, "combined medicine" pathway, in which a provisional place is held in the Sydney Medical Program for students until they complete one of the following three-year undergraduate degrees at the University:

- Bachelor of Arts
- Bachelor of Science

Securing such a place is highly competitive, as only around forty such places are offered each year - thirty for domestic students and ten for international students. Entry is on the basis of the Australian Tertiary Admission Rank (ATAR) or equivalent, and a semi-structured panel interview.

Since the introduction of this admissions pathway in 2005, the ATAR cut-off or equivalent has consistently been 99.95, the highest cut-off of any undergraduate-entry program offered in Australia.

== Research activity ==
The School has a very large research base, with its disciplines and affiliated institutes actively engaged in research in both the basic sciences and all major areas of clinical medicine, through six major themes:

- Cancer
- Chronic Disease and Ageing
- Infection and Immunological Conditions
- Neurosciences and Mental Health
- Obesity, Diabetes and Cardiovascular Disease
- Reproductive, Maternal and Child Health

=== Sydney Health Ethics ===
Sydney Health Ethics, previously the Centre for Values, Ethics and the Law in Medicine (VELiM), is an independent centre associated with the School of Public Health in the Sydney Medical School. It has also been associated with the Unit for the History and Philosophy of Science in the Faculty of Science.

The Centre was established in 1995 by John Miles Little. It is a centre for academic research, for teaching and learning in bioethics and the medical humanities, and for ethical consultation and discussion.

== Clinical schools and teaching hospitals ==
Sydney Medical School is supported by eight clinical schools, which are based at major teaching hospitals across New South Wales:

- Central Clinical School: Royal Prince Alfred Hospital
- Westmead Clinical School: Westmead Hospital
- The Children's Hospital at Westmead Clinical School: The Children's Hospital at Westmead
- Concord Clinical School: Concord Repatriation General Hospital
- Nepean Clinical School: Nepean Hospital
- Northern Clinical School: Royal North Shore Hospital
- School of Rural Health: Dubbo Base Hospital and Orange Health Service
- The University Centre for Rural Health: Lismore Base Hospital

A number of smaller hospitals also act as teaching hospitals.
