= Australian Securities and Investments Commission v Rich =

2001–2009 Australian court case regarding the collapse of One.Tel

ASIC v Rich
- Court: Supreme Court of New South Wales
- Decided: 18 November 2009
- Citations: [2009] NSWSC 1229, (2009) 236 FLR 1; 75 ACSR 1

Court membership
- Judge sitting: Austin J

Keywords
- Directors' duties

Australian Securities and Investments Commission v Rich was one of the biggest civil cases in NSW Supreme Court history, in which the Australian Securities and Investments Commission accused former executive directors of One.Tel telecommunications company, Jodee Rich and Mark Silbermann, of having failed to meet their duty of care in the months leading up to the company's collapse in May 2001. The legal process ran for almost nine years, took up 232 sitting days and generated 16,642 pages of transcripts. In November 2009, the NSW Supreme Court Justice Robert Austin comprehensively dismissed ASIC's case against the Rich and Silbermann, saying the corporate regulator had failed to prove any aspect of its pleaded case against either defendant.

== Facts ==
One.Tel was a service provider of GSM mobile and long-distance calls formed by Rich (with James Packer as a shareholder) in Australia in 1995. One.Tel expanded its operations overseas in 1998 and in 1999, Packer's Publishing and Broadcasting and News Corporation made a $600 million investment in the business as it committed to building Australia's fourth mobile network.

One.Tel grew to become the fourth largest Australian Telco with 3 million subscribers, 3000 employees, operations in 7 countries and a $1 billion annual turnover with the market cap at peak standing at $5.4 billion.

=== Trial ===
In May 2001, Packer and Murdoch's PBL and News Corporation withdrew their earlier stated support for an underwritten rights issue, the Telco then collapsed.

They claimed One.Tel needed $300 million to survive and instructed Ernst and Young to write a report in 36 hours to test this claim. However, former One.Tel auditor and Ernst and Young chairman Brian Long who was responsible for this report, had parts of his evidence rejected by Justice Robert Austin. A file note belonging to Brian Long, "Extract from Underwriting", taken during meetings with the Packers was disclosed during cross examination. Mr Long had a relationship with the Packer family over many years.

It was found that the Rights issue and the continued assistance of the major shareholders would have been enough to support One.Tel until November 2001, by which time the company's businesses would have been generating a healthy group cash flow. The withdrawal of the support may have ensured the company's downfall.

One.Tel ceased operation in Australia in June 2001 and in the same month, ASIC obtained criminal warrants and raids the One.Tel executive directors' houses. Shortly after, ASIC obtained a freezing order over all Jodee Rich's assets and selected family assets, they did not raid the houses, freeze the assets or seize documents of Packer, Murdoch, Yates or any other PBL director.

The Australian operations of the company, which were in Liquidation with 1 million One.Tel subscribers acquired for over $200 million, was sold to Optus and Telstra for a few million dollars in 2001.

ASIC were unable to find minutes of the Commissioners (3 December 2001) meeting where the decision was made to launch proceedings against the defendants. Jan Redfern, ASIC's Executive Director of Enforcement stated there was no formal record of the meeting.

Jan Redfern, refused to provide important company documents. However, the Supreme Court ordered ASIC to provide adequate discovery.

Packer flew a team around the world gathering evidence to assist ASIC with their case

During this time, there were settlement discussions in which ASIC offered a compromise 20-year banning order against the directors.

ASIC's claim

ASIC alleged that Rich and Silbermann failed to exercise due care and diligence by failing to keep the board of directors of One.Tel sufficiently informed of material information about the true financial condition, performance and prospects of One.Tel, especially in the period leading up to the cancellation of a proposed rights issue in May 2001.

ASIC sought $92m in damages and a lifetime banning order against the former One.Tel directors.

Trial Counsel

- Robert MacFarlan QC- ASIC Barrister
- Philip Durack, SC
- David L Williams, SC J Rich Barrister
- Mark J Steele- J Rich Barrister

Plaintiffs and Defendants

- David Knott- ASIC Chairman
- Joanne Rees- ASIC Lawyer
- Jan Redfern- Executive Director Enforcement
- Jodee Rich
- Mark Silbermann

ASIC Witnesses

- James Packer
- Lachlan Murdoch
- Guy Jalland
- Peter Yates
- Brian Long
- Christopher Weston
- Paul Carter PwC expert
- Dick Warburton - Woolworths Chairman
- Sam Randall - Jnr Treasury Manager
- Jan Redfern - Director Enforcement
- Joanne Rees
- Geoff Kleemann PBL CFO
- Chris Werner One.Tel UK CFO
- Drew Boaden - One.Tel UK CFO
- Paul Carter - PwC partner, Expert witness
- Peter Yates - PBL Director

The Stats

- 67 interlocutory judgments.
- 16,642 pages of hearing transcript
- 232 hearing days Including 9 days in London
- 3000 page judgment
- 104 affidavits
- 243 written submission documents

ASIC's $2m Expert Report

PricewaterhouseCoopers Expert Paul Carter, provided evidence that Justice Robert Austin considered to be flawed. The report consisted of 402 paragraphs detailing One.Tel's financial situation before its collapse, analysing thousands of documents and emails.

CGU

CGU, the provider of the companies Director and Officers liability insurance, denied cover. As a result, John Greaves, One.Tel chairman and Brad Keeling, the joint managing Director, were unable to fund their defense.

Packer's evidence

In Packer's evidence, 1,951 questions were delivered in its cross-examination to which Mr Packer Jnr replied "I can’t recall". Packer claimed that he couldn't recall questions he had with his father, Kerry Packer about One.Tel or the details about several meetings. Justice Robert Austin decided that his approach to the cross examination was misconceived and was reflected in occasionally aggressive answers.

Murdoch's evidence

Similarly, Murdoch responded with "I can’t recall" in 881 questions, a higher daily rate than Mr Packer Jnr. It was decided by Justice Robert Austin that there was a significant problem with the lack of recollection in his evidence which inevitably undermined its credibility.

Brian Long's evidence

Brian Long had parts of his evidence rejected by Justice Robert Austin. A file note belonging to Brian Long "Extract from Underwriting" taken during meetings with the Packers was disclosed during cross examination. Mr Long had a relationship with the Packer family over many years.

Kleemann's evidence

Kleemann's evidence was seen to be an attempt to minimize a role that was in reality, quite significant. It was therefore decided that Mr Kleemann's evidence be treated with caution.

Boaden's evidence

Boaden's evidence was judged as unreliable due in part to his involvement as a paid consultant for the Packer interest

Weston's evidence

Weston's evidence was not accepted due to its inconsistency with the defendants evidence. Also Weston had a professed lack of recollection.

Werner's evidence

Similarly, Werner's evidence was described as unsatisfactory and implausible and vague.

== Judgment ==
The trial concluded on 18 November 2009 in which Justice Robert Austin declared that ASIC had "failed in every aspect of their case", "failed to call key witnesses" and "exaggerated the effect of evidence or misleadingly took passages of evidence out of context". It was also decided that ASIC's summary of Mr Rich's evidence in the witness box was inaccurate.

Justice Robert Austin, in his judgment, provided the first comprehensive judicial analysis of the statutory business judgment defence in s 180(2) of the Corporations Act 2001. The business judgment rule is capable of providing a defence for directors whose conduct breaches section 180(1). Justice Austin acknowledged that was an untested area of the law and a contentious legal issue.

In 2003, the NSW Supreme Court handed down a decision which recognises that under certain circumstances, the chairman of the board holds special responsibilities above those of the non-executive directors. This decision was the result of an application issued by former One.Tel chairman John Greaves during the case.

== Significance ==
The judgment was widely reported in the general media and a number of papers written by legal firms. The trial, in total, cost the Australian Government over $35 million. It has been estimated that ASIC spent over $20m on the case, $6 million by Packer, $4 million by One.Tel, $15 million by Rich (reimbursed in significant part by ASIC) and $5 million by CGU.

In February 2010, ASIC has announced it will not appeal the decision. On 24 August 2010, it was announced that James Packer and Lachlan Murdoch would be sued for $244 million plus damages by Liquidator Paul Weston, who filed a claim in May 2007 but only activated it in 2010. The case centres on the May 2001 undertaking by PBL and News Ltd to underwrite a proposed issue of One.Tel shares to raise $132 million.

On 14 September 2010, Rich announced that he would not proceed with a court case against James Packer and Lachlan Murdoch. This low-key private action was a "shadow" of Paul Weston's case and was filed in 2007 but never served on the defendants. Rich stated that he had resolved all outstanding issues with James Packer and his family company.

== See also ==
- Australian company law
- UK company law
- US corporate law
