= John Miles Little =

Australian surgeon (1933–2023)

John Miles Little (28 December 1933 – 30 September 2023) was an Australian academic and surgeon.

== Early life and education ==
Little was born and raised in Sydney to orthopaedic surgeon Norman Little and Marion Friend. Little received a classical education at Cranbrook School, where he was the Head Boy. As an undergraduate, Little studied arts at the University of Sydney, residing at St Paul's College. He was later invited to join University House at the Australian National University under historian A.D. Trendall.

Little returned to the University of Sydney to study medicine, graduating in 1959. He trained at Royal Prince Alfred Hospital (RPAH), where he received Fellowship of the Royal Australasian College of Surgeons in 1963. After holding roles as a demonstrator in anatomy and a tutor in surgery, he was appointed Clinical Superintendent at RPAH in 1964. In 1966, Lttle received the Nuffield Dominion Travelling Fellowship and worked under Regius Professor Sir Andrew Kay at the University of Glasgow.

== Career ==
In 1967, Little became honorary assistant surgeon at RPAH and senior lecturer in surgery. He was promoted to associate professor in 1971.

In 1978, Little was appointed the Foundation Professor of Surgery at Westmead Hospital, holding the position until 1996 and serving as Department of Surgery Chairman until 1990.

In 1987, Little co-founded the World Association of Hepatic Pancreatic and Biliary Surgeons. In 1993, he was made a Member of the Order of Australia for his contributions to medicine, particularly in hepatic and vascular surgery.

In 1995, Little ended his surgical career and published Humane Medicine with Cambridge University Press and established the Centre for Values, Ethics, and the Law in Medicine (VELiM) at the University of Sydney, where he worked until 2003.

== Research ==
Little's research covered peripheral vascular disease, hepatobiliary conditions, cancer chemotherapy, and related fields. He published works on managing liver injuries (1971) and amputations for vascular disease (1975).
