= Gethyn Hewan =

English cricketer and schoolmaster

Personal information
- Full name: Gethyn Elliot Hewan
- Born: 23 December 1916; Edinburgh, Midlothian, Scotland
- Died: 1 July 1988 (aged 71); Chertsey, Surrey, England
- Batting: Right-handed
- Bowling: Right-arm off break

Domestic team information
- Years: Team
- 1938: Cambridge University
- 1946: Berkshire

Career statistics
| Competition | First-class |
|---|---|
| Matches | 6 |
| Runs scored | 187 |
| Batting average | 20.77 |
| 100s/50s | –/1 |
| Top score | 88 |
| Balls bowled | 1,157 |
| Wickets | 20 |
| Bowling average | 36.25 |
| 5 wickets in innings | 2 |
| 10 wickets in match | – |
| Best bowling | 6/91 |
| Catches/stumpings | 2/– |
- Source: Cricinfo, 13 February 2019

Gethyn Elliot Hewan (23 December 1916 – 1 July 1988) was an English first-class cricketer and schoolmaster. He studied mathematics as the University of Cambridge, during which he played first-class cricket for Cambridge University Cricket Club, before accepting a fellowship to study at Yale University. He served in the Second World War with the Royal Horse Artillery, for which he was mentioned in dispatches. Following the war he took up teaching posts at several educational establishments, most notably as headmaster of Cranbrook School, Sydney.

== Early life and first-class cricket ==
Born at Edinburgh, Hewan was educated at Marlborough College, where he was taught by Brian Hone. From Marlborough he went up to Clare College, Cambridge to study mathematics. He debuted in first-class cricket for Cambridge University in 1938 against the Free Foresters at Fenner's, with Hewan making a total of six first-class appearances for the university in 1938, which was to be his only season of first-class cricket. A bowling all-rounder, Hewan scored 187 runs at an average of 20.77, with a high score of 88. With his off break bowling, he took 20 wickets at a bowling average of 36.25, with best figures of 6/91. These figures, one of two five wicket hauls he took, came against Oxford University. He was awarded a blue in cricket, alongside one in hockey. He was awarded the Andrew Mellon Fellowship to study at Yale University, travelling to the United States in 1938. He graduated with a major in mathematics.

== World War II and move to Australia ==
With the outbreak of the Second World War in 1939, Hewan returned to England and enlisted in the British Army, joining the Royal Horse Artillery. He saw action in North Africa, including at Tobruk. He was mentioned in dispatches in November 1945 in recognition of gallantry and distinguished service in North-West Europe.

Following the conclusion of the war he was appointed as the mathematics master at Wellington College, Berkshire. Relocating to Berkshire saw Hewan play minor counties cricket for Berkshire in 1946, making two appearances in the Minor Counties Championship. On the recommendation of Hone, he became the headmaster of Cranbrook School in Sydney. He accepted the position in November 1950, he relinquished his commission in the Royal Horse Artillery in July 1951, upon which he was granted the honorary rank of major.

In Australia, he was a founding member of the Australian College of Education, and was a strong supporter of the Outward Bound movement. He was a promoter of the house system at Cranbrook, as well as promoting the benefits of extra-curricular activities to its pupils. He oversaw a number of new developments at the school, including the War Memorial Hall in 1953, Dickins House in Rose Bay in 1959 as the Cranbrook Preparatory School, and the Science Building which was opened in 1962. He was a keen amateur golfer, winning the Royal Sydney Golf Championship eight times. He resigned as the headmaster of Cranbrook in 1963, nominating Mark Bishop as his successor.

== Return to England and later life ==
He returned to England shortly after, where he took up master posts at Winchester College and Charterhouse School. He took up the post of headmaster at Allhallows School in Lyme Regis, a position he held from 1965 to 1973. During his tenure as headmaster he oversaw a period of modernisation at the school. He announced his retirement on the grounds of ill health at the end of the 1973 summer term.

He died at Chertsey in July 1988, and was survived by his wife Peggy, who died aged 96 in 2010, and their three children.
