= Open Telecommunications =

Open Telecommunications Ltd.
- Type: Public
- Traded as: AX:OTT
- Industry: Telecommunications
- Founded: 1995; 31 years ago
- Founder: Wayne Passlow
- Fate: Bankruptcy
- Successor: S2Net Limited
- Headquarters: Sydney, Australia
- Key people: Wayne Passlow, Stuart Powell
- Products: Management systems

Open Telecommunications Ltd. is a defunct software company supplying the telecommunications industry. The company was founded by Wayne Passlow as a private company in North Sydney, Australia. Open Telecommunications provides products and services that collectively deliver a new generation of telecommunications network infrastructure. The Open Telecommunications infrastructure includes switching products, content and services, and management systems.

At its peak, Open Tel (AX:OTT) claimed to serve the five continents with long list of clients including Samsung and LG Electronics in South Korea, telcos in The Netherlands, United States, and Peru. Local customers include: Optus, One.Tel and COMindico (also founded by Wayne Passlow). The company also enjoyed financial and technological backing from the networking giant Cisco Systems.

The junior telco shared the same powerful backers as the defunct One.Tel: James Packer and Lachlan Murdoch. It also suffered the same fate as One.Tel.

However, unlike One.Tel, The telco downfall is more due to unfavourable market rather than mismanagement. The painful crash start in 2000 before finally going into voluntary administration in April 2002, when its shares were trading at five cents.

== A chronological outline of the Open Tel story ==
=== The Beginning ===
The company started in late 1995 with a few software developers from Telstra and Optus. The Managing Director, Wayne Passlow was a successful Sales Manager for Sun Microsystems in Australasia.

=== Expansion ===
In August 1999, the company acquired the business of Siemens Research, the Australian network management business unit of Siemens located in Melbourne. In March 2000, Open Telecommunications completed the acquisition of wireless telecommunications software developer, Indian Pacific Communications.

=== Listing in ASX ===
Open Telecommunications Ltd was listed in ASX with the highest first day price increase in history. The Share price went up more than four folds the IPO price. The securities were suspended from the ASX on 30 April 2002 and reinstated 3 February 2004. The company was delisted in 2006.

=== Acquisition by Macquarie Bank ===
On 30 March 2005, it was announced that founder Wayne Passlow would partner with Macquarie Bank to privatise the company at an estimated cost of $7 million. In April it was revealed that the sale could be blocked by the company's then-largest shareholder, Gordon Martin, though the acquisition would ultimately succeed. In August, the company announced that Passlow would stand down as CEO. In May 2006, Macquarie announced it had rebranded the company as S2Net.
