= Frederick Perkins (schoolteacher) =

Australian schoolteacher and Anglican minister (1877–1960)

The Reverend Frederick Perkins
- Born: 23 January 1877; Westbury, Wiltshire, United Kingdom
- Died: 13 November 1960 (aged 83); Wahroongah, New South Wales, Australia
- Education: University of Sydney (B.A.(Hons), M.A.)
- Occupations: Schoolmaster and Priest

Frederick Thomas Perkins (23 January 1877 – 13 November 1960) was an Australian schoolmaster and Anglican minister. He was born in Wiltshire, England, the son of a schoolteacher. Migrating with his family to Queensland, Perkins was educated at the Townsville Grammar School where he became Head boy and Senior Prefect, then the University of Sydney where he took honours in Latin and Greek and, as Eleanor Abbott scholar, resided in St Paul's College. After completing his master's degree in Latin and a brief spell in teaching, Perkins entered the Church of England priesthood. Despite this, Perkins remained committed to education as his profession. In 1908 Perkins became headmaster of the new Monaro Grammar School at Cooma and in 1913 he was appointed headmaster of The Armidale School. In 1918 was charged to become the founding headmaster of the new independent Anglican Cranbrook School in Bellevue Hill, New South Wales. There he was most successful and would remain as headmaster for sixteen years until he retired in 1932. After serving in various parish positions, he returned to England in 1947. Returning to Australia in 1955, he lived in retirement until his death in November 1960.

Educational offices
Preceded by T K Abbott	Headmaster of The Armidale School; 1913 – 1918	Succeeded by J Forster
New title	Headmaster of Cranbrook School; 1918 – 1932	Succeeded by Iven Mackay
