= PeopleBrowsr =

Technology company

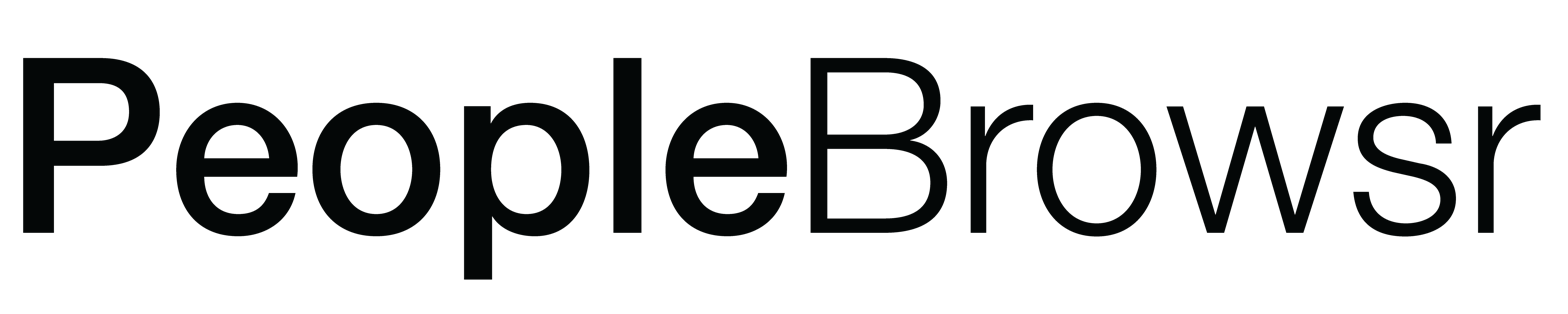
- Company type: Private
- Website type: Social Networking
- Available in: English
- Founded: California San Francisco, California
- Headquarters: San Francisco, United States
- Area served: Worldwide
- Founder: Jodee Rich
- Key people: Jodee Rich CEO
- Employees: 33
- Website: peoplebrowsr.com
- Advertising: No
- Registration: Optional
- Launched: 2006
- Current status: Active

PeopleBrowsr is a technology company that provides enterprise, government and Top Level Domain owners with the ability to launch their own blockchain integrated social networks and analyze and engage the members of those networks. An owner of new TLDs itself, PeopleBrowsr is the creator of .CEO, .Best (sold to The Best SAS in July 2018) and .Kred.

== Company profile ==
PeopleBrowsr works with enterprise, government and TLD owners in multiple industries. In December 2008, it launched a deep search dashboard for managing and engaging with the social stream. PeopleBrowsr has been receiving, analyzing and indexing the full Twitter firehose since 2008. In combination with other sources, PeopleBrowsr has compiled a trillion conversation datamine which enables it to conduct analytics using Kred Influence Measurement Company has combined its trillion conversation datamine, Kred Influencer Analytics, SocialOS network platform and three TLDs, to become the leading Social Network provider for organizations around the world.

== Kred ==
In October 2011, the company debuted Kred for measuring influence and outreach on social networks.

== Experimental projects ==
PeopleBrowsr is engaged in research projects including the development of artificial intelligence and new social networking platforms. PeopleBrowsr CEO Jodee Rich believes that the documenting of history in real time with social networking platforms is creating a wealth of data that can be used to help computers better understand human behavior. In this way, machines can be trained to mine the human data to learn behavior, rather than having to be taught how to think like humans.

== SocialOS ==
In June 2013 PeopleBrowsr launched SocialOS which is a set of APIs which bridges existing networks and enables new social networks to be rapidly rolled-out.

== Top Level Domains ==
PeopleBrowsr owns Top Level Domains .CEO, .Kred, and formerly .Best. These domains were released in late 2013 and early 2014 and are powered by the Company's products: SocialOS, Kred and its Trillion Conversation Datamine.

== Sale of the .Best Top Level Domain ==
In June 2018, PeopleBrowsr received approval from ICANN (Internet Corporation for Assigned Names and Numbers) to sell its BestTLD Pty Ltd subsidiary to The Best SAS, a Paris-based company led by President, Cyril Fremont, in a strategic deal that would leverage PeopleBrowsr's SocialOS technology.

BestTLD Pty Ltd owns the .Best Top Level Domain. It has distribution agreements with GoDaddy and over 50 other Domain Registrars.

== Litigation ==
In November 2012, PeopleBrowsr sued Twitter over a proposed shutdown of PeopleBrowser's access to the Twitter firehose, which was set to occur on November 30, 2012. After PeopleBrowsr won an injunction to prevent the disconnection of the Twitter firehose, Twitter attempted to move the case into Federal court, which may have invalidated the injunction. In March 2013 PeopleBrowsr won a battle to keep the case within the California court system, thereby keeping the injunction in place. Twitter and PeopleBrowsr reached an out-of-court settlement in April 2013.
