= List of UK businesses entering administration during the 2008–2009 financial crisis =

This is a list of UK businesses entering administration during the 2008–2009 financial crisis.

== UK insolvent businesses ==
LSE listed companies that entered administration, by date, due to the impacts of the post-summer-2007 credit crunch and/or the late 2000s recession.

Company	Date	Administrators	Branch Closures	Job Losses	Further Information Source	Outcome
Principles	02/03/2009	Deloitte				BBC News
Viyella	07/01/2009	Poppleton & Appleby				BBC News
Waterford Wedgwood	05/01/2008	Deloitte		367		BBC News
Morgan	31/12/2008	KPMG				
USC	29/12/2008	PKF			Google Associated Press	
Adams Childrenswear	28/12/2008	PricewaterhouseCoopers			BBC News	
Zavvi	24/12/2008	Ernst & Young	22	178	BBC News The Business Desk	
Whittard of Chelsea	23/12/2008	Ernst & Young			ITN	Sold to private equity company Epic
The Officers Club	23/12/2008	PricewaterhouseCoopers			BBC News	118 of the chain's 150 stores were sold, others closed
The Pier	04/12/2008	Mazars			BBC News	
MFI	26/11/2008	Menzies Corporate Restructuring	111	1400	BBC News	
Woolworths	26/11/2008	Deloitte	815	30,000 circa	Guardian	Stores all closed by 6 January 2009
Rosebys	25/09/2008	KPMG			Telegraph	
XL Leisure	12/09/2008	Kroll			BBC News	
Wrapit	04/09/2008	KPMG	278	1256	WalesOnline	
Silverjet	30/05/2008	Begbies Traynor			BBC News	
