= Dudley McCarthy =

Australian military historian, soldier and diplomat

- Born: 24 July 1911; Sydney, Australia
- Died: 3 October 1987 (aged 76); Canberra, Australia

Academic work
- Main interests: Australian military history Second World War
- Notable works: Volume V of Australia in the War of 1939–1945
- Military career
- Branch: Australian Army
- Service years: 1940–1945
- Rank: Temporary Major
- Units: 2/17th Battalion; HQ, 6th Australian Division; HQ, II Corps
- Conflicts: Second World War; North African campaign; Home Front; New Guinea campaign
- Awards: Member of the Order of the British Empire

Dudley McCarthy (24 July 1911 – 3 October 1987) was an Australian military historian, soldier and diplomat. He served in the Second World War as an intelligence officer and later authored of one of the volumes of the official history series Australia in the War of 1939–1945, dealing with the early stages of the New Guinea campaign, as well as a biography of Charles Bean. He joined the Department of External Affairs in 1963 and served terms as Ambassador to Mexico (1967–1972) and Ambassador to Spain (1972–1976).

== Early life ==
Dudley McCarthy was born in North Sydney in New South Wales, Australia on 24 July 1911, one of four sons of a schoolteacher, James McCarthy, and his wife. He went to Kempsey West Intermediate High School after which he studied at the University of Sydney. He obtained a Bachelor of Arts degree in 1932 and a Diploma of Education the following year. Unable to secure a teaching position due to the Depression, McCarthy found work as a patrol officer in New Guinea where his area of responsibility covered the Morobe and Sepik districts. The work was dangerous; on one occasion he was wounded by arrows fired by hostile locals.

In 1935, the New South Wales Department of Education resumed hiring new teachers and McCarthy returned to Australia to take up a position teaching English and history at Petersham Intermediate and Homebush Junior Boys’ High schools. In 1938, he gave up teaching to work at Qantas Empire Airways as a flight clerk for the company's flying-boat service.

== Second World War ==
Soon after the outbreak of the Second World War, McCarthy enlisted in the Australian Imperial Force and was posted to 2/17th Battalion. He was commissioned as a lieutenant in July 1940 and went with the battalion to North Africa later in the year as its intelligence officer. He served through the Siege of Tobruk and was then transferred to the headquarters of 6th Division. In March 1942, he returned to Australia and held staff roles for several months. In 1944 he was posted to the headquarters of II Corps, then engaged in the New Guinea campaign, as a temporary major. He continued to serve in II Corps when it was transferred to the Bougainville campaign later that year. As a result of his service in New Guinea and Bougainville, he was made a Member of the Order of the British Empire, which was published in the London Gazette in March 1947.

== Official History ==
In 1943, the Australian Government selected Gavin Long as general editor of the Australia in the War of 1939–1945. This was to be a 22-volume official history of Australia's involvement in the Second World War. He progressed the project for the next several years, planning various volumes and identifying potential authors. In 1946 Long selected McCarthy as the author of the volume concerning the Australian Army's effort during 1942 in New Guinea. Long's decision was based on an account that McCarthy had written of the retreat to Tobruk in the early stages of the North African campaign, published in The Bulletin.

McCarthy worked on his volume, titled South-West Pacific Area–First Year: Kokoda to Wau, concurrently with his diplomatic career. The book covered the fighting during the first year of the campaign in Papua New Guinea, including along the Kokoda Trail. As part of his preparation, he walked the Kokoda Trail itself. His work also provided a balanced account of the Japanese efforts during the fighting. It was published in 1959.

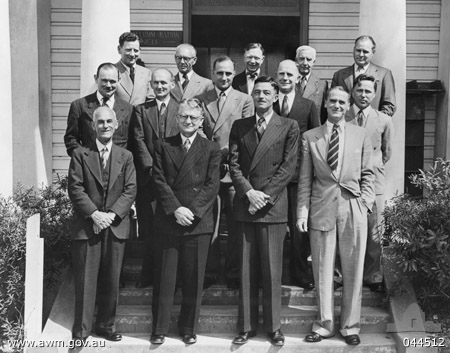
A group photo of the authors of Australia in the War of 1939–1945 in 1954. McCarthy stands first right in the front row

== Later life ==
In the immediate postwar period, McCarthy was on the Universities Commission. In 1952, he was served in the Department of Territories, and six years later was appointed assistance secretary of the department. In this capacity, he was Australia's senior commissioner on the South Pacific Commission. He was special representative for Australia, responsible for New Guinea and Nauru, on the United Nations Trusteeship Council from 1961 to 1962.

In 1963, McCarthy transferred to the Department of External Affairs, becoming the Australian minister to the United Nations for three years. He then was posted to Mexico as the Australian ambassador for a five term. In 1972, he was appointed ambassador to Spain and served in that role until his retirement from the diplomatic service in 1976. In 1973 he was also nominated to become the first Australian ambassador to the Holy See, but the Vatican refused to accept the nomination on the grounds that McCarthy had been divorced.

McCarthy was made chairman of the Films Board of Review in 1977, and remained in the post until 1981. During this time, he published a novel, The Fate of O’Loughlin: A Novel. He then worked on a biography of the well known war historian Charles Bean, which was published in 1983 as Gallipoli to the Somme. Although it was received the 1984 Best Australian Book of the Year award, it was limited to Bean's war years and did not delve into the preparation and publication of the Official History of Australia in the War of 1914–1918. Dennis et al describes McCarthy's biography as "disappointing".

McCarthy died in Canberra, where he was living at the time, on 3 October 1987. He was survived by four children, three of which were from his second marriage, and his second wife. His papers are held by the National Library of Australia.
