= FlowTex =

German company involved in a fraud case

The FlowTex Technology GmbH & Co. KG, located in Ettlingen, Baden, was a company that engaged in fraudulent activity involving horizontal drilling machines for laying underground pipelines. Between 1994 and 1999, almost 4.2 billion Deutsche Marks in damages were incurred. According to widespread estimates, this was the largest case of white-collar crime in German history up to that point.

During the investigation, 55 searches were conducted, and 123 proceedings were initiated against 110 suspects. The four main perpetrators received a total of 58 years in prison, and two FDP state ministers lost their positions. The prosecution calculated the damage at 4.9 billion DM (adjusted for purchasing power, roughly 3.7 billion EUR today), including approximately 0.7 billion DM that would have been deposited into the company's account for the FlowTex bond issued by Commerzbank and Dresdner Bank, three days after the arrest of the main perpetrator, Manfred Schmider.

== Scandal ==
What started as a legal business with a viable model soon turned into large-scale fraud; in reality, FlowTex had only produced 181 machines that were sold multiple times, with the certificates and identification plates manipulated according to the scam. At one point, the same machine was paraded at various different fake construction sites to potential investors during the same inspection; it later emerged that they had moved the machine from one location to another during lunch breaks. Over a period of ten years or so, they secured loans worth more than two billion Euros for non-existent drilling systems and the scam is widely tipped as Germany’s largest ever prosecuted case of white-collar crime.

=== Sentencing and aftermath ===
The scam was aided by a network of co-conspirators that included family, friends and employees of the firm, but ultimately it was Schmider and Kleiser who paid the largest price for their crimes; they were both arrested in February 2000 on suspicion of fraud and tax evasion, four years after the authorities were allegedly first tipped off about the fraudulent business practices. This apparent lack of determination to follow up on the leads was allegedly partly due to concerns that such investigations would jeopardise jobs and compromise leading politicians who had courted the FlowTex directors as model businessmen. Also suspicious was that the tax inspector assigned to FlowTex was a tennis partner of one of the FlowTex directors. However, to date there have been no indications that the FlowTex management or any politicians tried to directly influence the proceedings.
