= Imagineering Australia =

Former software distribution company

- Industry: Software distribution
- Founded: 1981
- Founder: Jodee Rich
- Defunct: 1990
- Fate: Sold to Tech Pacific; Merged
- Headquarters: Australia
- Number of employees: 600

Imagineering was a software distribution company founded by Jodee Rich in 1981. It grew rapidly before running into financial trouble in the late 1980s. Imagineering was sold to First Pacific in 1990 at which time Jodee Rich left the business. Graham Pickles, managing director of sister company Tech Pacific, took the helm of the group and merged the two businesses together under the Tech Pacific banner in 1990.

The company was most famous for distributing the following product ranges:

- Lotus Development
- Ashton-Tate
- AST
- Wyse
- Control Data (Storage Products only)
- Mountain Computer
- Seagate
- 3Com
- Intel
- NetComm

In addition, the company maintained a factory in Taipei, Taiwan, where it manufactured its own line of Personal computers under the "Ultra By Imagineering" brandname. The majority of these were based on components manufactured by DTC computer. These machines proved very popular with home and small business users in Australia and New Zealand, because of their low entry price, the availability of telephone support and full service in case of failure. A rough chronology of the Ultra product family was:

Mid 1987: The original Ultra XT was created by Tony Ianuzzelli. It used a 6 MHz 8088 CPU, was supplied with 640KB of RAM, a single 5.25" floppy diskette drive, CGA graphics and an optional 20Mb hard disk drive.

June 1988: The second generation Ultra XT was created by Lindsay Vagg. CPU speed was now 8 MHz, and an EGA display was available.

December 1988: Chris Moran and Carlo Incorvia created the Ultra AT. A "Baby-AT" chassis with 10 MHz 80286 CPU, 1MB RAM, EGA or VGA graphics (using Twinhead company cards). All models had either 20 or 40MB half-height hard drives.

June 1989: Chris Moran created the second generation Ultra AT. CPU Speed increased to 12 MHz, and 80 - 141MB hard drive options were offered.

November 1989: The MyPC, basically an Ultra XT using cut-price components and secondhand CPUs in brightly coloured chassis, was released for sale through Grace Bros and Myer stores at Christmas.

Other machines were developed, but never released for sale. These included:

- The Ultra 386. This was eventually replaced by an OEM Intel 80386 system.
- The Ultra SX. Using an 80386SX motherboard in the Ultra AT chassis.
- Gallileo: A high-end server for 3Com networks, using a 25 MHz 80386 processor and up to 2 141MB SCSI Hard Drives
