= St Heliers Correctional Centre =

Prison farm in New South Wales, Australia

- Interactive map of St Heliers Correctional Centre
- Location: Muswellbrook, New South Wales; 32.22785°S 150.913599°E
- Status: Operational
- Security class: Minimum (male)
- Capacity: 286
- Opened: September 1989
- Managed by: Corrective Services NSW

St Heliers Correctional Centre is a prison farm for men located outside the town of Muswellbrook, New South Wales, Australia, and operated by the Corrective Services division of the Department of Communities and Justice. St Heliers generally holds prisoners serving sentences under State or Australian criminal law and has a capacity of 256.

== History ==
The property was originally settled by Lieutenant Colonel Henry Dumaresq and named after Saint Helier, Jersey. The New South Wales State Government purchased the property in 1945 and it was used as a child welfare institution until its closure in 1986. It reopened as a correctional centre in September 1989.

The centre is largely self-sufficient in terms of beef and vegetable produce and provides the 9,700 prisoners in the other low security prisons in NSW with food. At peak, the centre runs 350 head of cattle. Inmates are also involved in furniture restoration, work in a local abattoir, and help maintain the Muswellbrook Cemetery and Vietnam Veterans Memorial.

The mobile outreach program of the correctional centre has worked on signage and restoration of the Great North Road, a trail from Sydney to the Hunter Valley built by convict labour during the 1820s, and listed on both the Australian National Heritage List and UNESCO's World Heritage list. The mobile prison program was suspended in 2003.

In 2012 the centre commenced a thoroughbred retraining and rehabilitation program in conjunction with Racing NSW.

== Notable inmates ==
- Rodney Adler – jailed between 2005 and 2007 for false or misleading statements and being dishonest as a director of a public company.
- Reg Lyttle – jailed between 1975 and 2010 for the murder of 15 people in an arson attack at the Savoy Hotel, Kings Cross on Christmas Day 1975.
- Titus Day

== See also ==
- Punishment in Australia
