= Ray Williams (businessman) =

Australian businessman and fraudster

- Born: Raymond Reginald Williams; 1937 (age 88–89)
- Occupations: former Company director, HIH Insurance
- Years active: 1968−2005
- Spouse: Rita Williams
- Penalty: four years six months imprisonment

Raymond Reginald Williams (born 1937) is an Australian businessperson. In 2005, he was imprisoned for a minimum of two years and nine months for filing false financial statements and failing his duty as a director. After Williams' criminal conviction, charities began removing his name from their donor plaques, and his award as Member of the Order of Australia was cancelled by order of the Governor-General.

== HIH collapse ==
In 1968, Williams was a co-founder of "M W Payne Underwriting Agency Pty Ltd", which over time evolved into HIH Insurance. HIH collapsed in 2001 with debts estimated at up to A$5.3 billion, the largest corporate collapse to that date. On 15 April 2005, Williams was sentenced to 4 years 6 months jail with a non-parole period of 2 years 9 months, after pleading guilty to misleading HIH shareholders about the financial position of the company. Williams was also banned from leading an Australian corporation for ten years.

Chief Justice Wood found in his judgement during the 2005 Royal Commission that Williams did not seek nor gain any financial advantage for his business mistakes nor was his criminal negligence the result of any deliberate deception.

== Assets ==
In the years prior to the HIH collapse, Willams transferred millions of dollars into his wife's name, which was used to purchase a luxury mansion and other property, assets and investments. The demise of HIH Insurance was Australia's biggest corporate collapse, and was the subject of a Royal Commission which led to the charges against Williams and his associates. However, Williams was declared bankrupt in 2007 after losing everything due to the collapse.

== Release from jail ==
On 14 January 2008, with media helicopters circling overhead, Williams was released on parole from Silverwater Correctional Centre. Newspapers reported Williams was looking forward to retiring in the Sydney suburb of Seaforth, where his wife, Rita owns a luxury home.

== See also ==
- Rodney Adler
