= Jane Hardy (diplomat) =

Australian diplomat

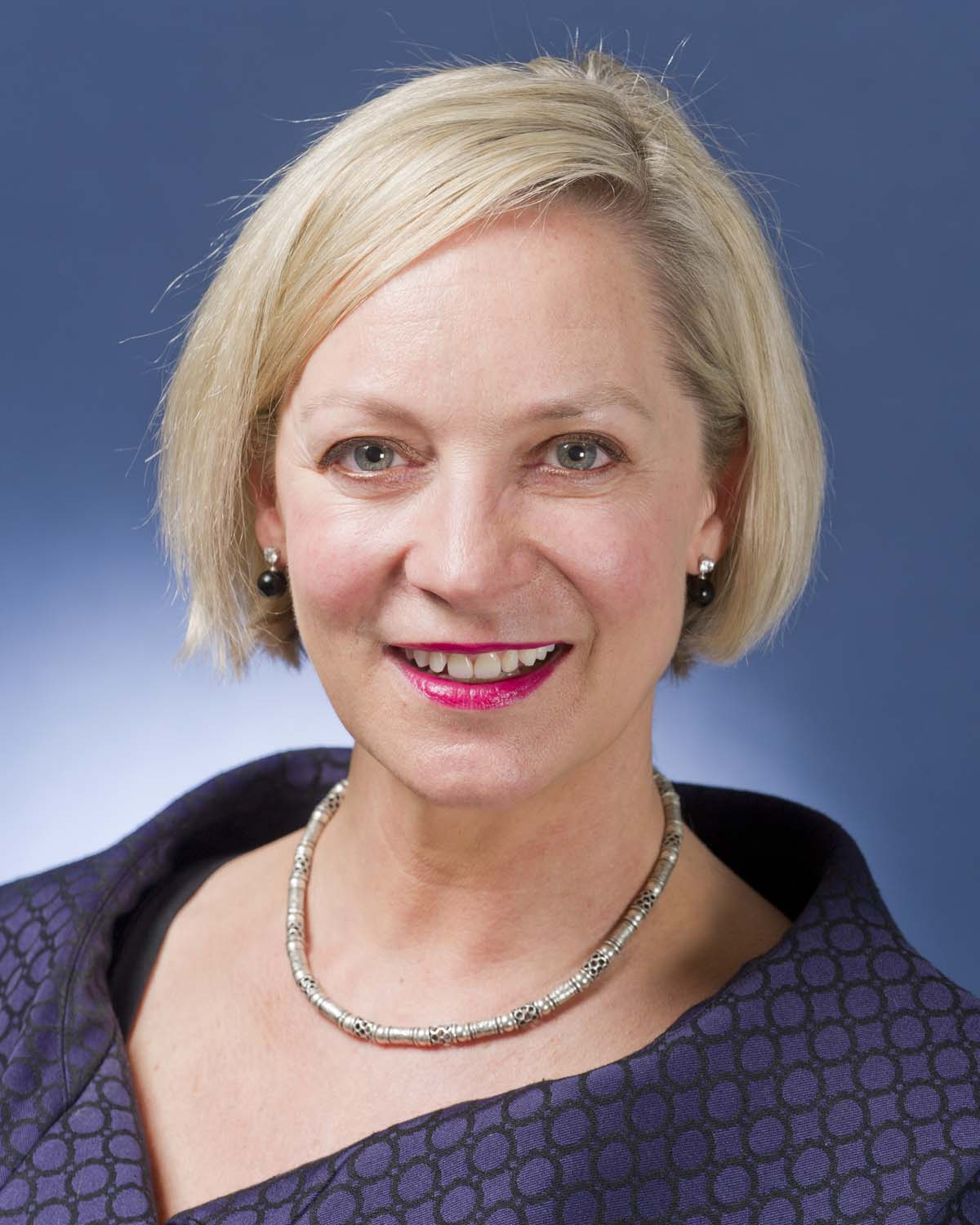
Hardy in 2012

Jane Hardy is an Australian diplomat who was the Ambassador to Spain with non-resident accreditation to Andorra and Equatorial Guinea. Hardy has been Consul-General in Honolulu since 22 December 2017.

== Education ==
Hardy earned a Masters of Arts degree from Monash University; a Graduate Diploma (Foreign Affairs and Trade) from the Australian National University; a Bachelor of Arts from Flinders University; and a Bachelor of Arts from the University of South Australia.

== Termination of Ambassadorship to Spain ==
Less than two years into a three-year term, Hardy "ceased duty" on 3 November 2014, and "returned by mutual agreement with the department" after the Australian Federal Police arrested her husband Vytas Kapociunas, on 20 September 2014, over "an allegation of sexual intercourse with a child outside Australia.",

In 2015, Kapociunas was found not guilty on two charges and on the third charge, the jury was unable to reach a verdict.
