= Rodney Adler =

Australian fraudster

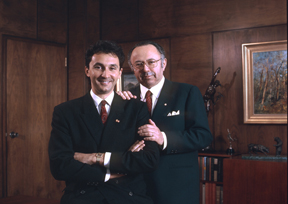
- Rodney Adler and his father Larry Adler, 1988
- Born: 19 August 1959 (age 67)
- Education: University of New South Wales; Macquarie University
- Occupations: Businessman, former company director
- Criminal charges: Disseminating false information, obtaining money through false or misleading statements, and failing to discharge his duties as a director in good faith (2005)
- Criminal penalty: 4 1/2 years' custody, with a non-parole period of 2 1/2 (14 April 2005)
- Criminal status: Released (13 October 2007)
- Spouse: Lyndi Adler
- Children: Jason, Romi, Natalie and Charlotte

Rodney Stephen Adler (born 19 August 1959) is an Australian whose family founded the FAI Insurances group, of which he became chief executive in 1989, and which was at one stage Australia's third largest general insurer. Adler became a director of HIH Insurance after the acquisition of that company, and resigned in January 2001, two months before HIH collapsed. He was jailed in 2005 for his conduct related to the collapse of HIH, where Adler obtained A$2 million from HIH by false or misleading statements and being dishonest as a director.

== Early life ==
Adler is the son of Hungarian Jewish immigrant Larry Adler, who founded the insurance company FAI in 1960. He was educated at Cranbrook School, and later obtained degrees of Bachelor of Commerce from the University of New South Wales and Master of Economics from Macquarie University and is a fellow of the Institute of Chartered Accountants and adjunct professor at the University of Technology Sydney.

== Business ==
Adler was appointed chief executive by the board of FAI after the death of his father in November 1988. During his tenure at FAI, Adler served as president of the Insurance Council of Australia and was a member of the Business Council of Australia and its Tax Task Force. He also served as joint chairman of Juvenile Diabetes Australia.

At the time, FAI was struggling with a number of loan exposures to troubled companies such as Bond Corp and Ariadne in the wake of the October 1987 stock market crash. FAI later became the subject of a takeover bid from HIH Insurance in September 1998. HIH acquired FAI for approximately A$280 million in cash and shares.

Following the acquisition, HIH sold several FAI-related assets, including its life insurance business, the St Moritz Hotel in New York, and shares in the telecommunications company One.Tel to raise about A$450 million.

Adler was also a founding director and shareholder of telecommunications company One.Tel. He was involved in bringing together One.Tel founders Jodee Rich and Brad Keeling with investors associated with the Packer and Murdoch families. Adler served on the company's board during its expansion in the late 1990s and was a significant shareholder.

After the FAI acquisition was completed Adler became a director of HIH in January 1999. HIH was already in trouble as a result of underprovisioning for claims over many years, and it accumulated large losses in the Lloyd's of London insurance market and in the US which eventually brought about its collapse in March 2001.

In the months preceding HIH's liquidation, the company sought to raise funds through asset sales. HIH sold the FAI insurance business into a joint venture with Germany's Allianz Group, with HIH and subsequently its liquidator receiving approximately A$320 million from the transaction. In September 2000, around the time of the Allianz transaction, Adler arranged for HIH funds to be invested through Pacific Eagle Equities.

One investment involved the purchase of HIH shares while the company's share price was declining. Adler resigned as a director of HIH in January 2001. Adler was later charged in relation to transactions involving Pacific Eagle Equities and his conduct as a HIH director.

== Conviction ==
In 1999, Adler was appointed a Member of the Order of Australia for services to the insurance industry and philanthropy, but gave up the award after his criminal conviction.

Adler was sentenced to 4 1/2 years' custody, with a non-parole period of 2 1/2 years after pleading guilty on 16 February 2005 to four criminal charges:

- two counts of disseminating information on 19 and 20 June 2000 respectively, knowing it was false in a material particular and which was likely to induce the purchase by other persons of shares in HIH contrary to Act 2001/ 999 (Cth);
- one count of obtaining money by false or misleading statements, contrary to Act 1900/ 178BB (NSW); and
- one count of being intentionally dishonest and failing to discharge his duties as a director of HIH in good faith and in the best interests of that company contrary to Act 2001/ 184(1)(b) (Cth).

In sentencing Adler, Justice Dunford said:

The offences are serious and display an appalling lack of commercial morality…Directors are not appointed to advance their own interests but to manage the company for the benefit of its shareholders to whom they owe fiduciary duties…They were not stupid errors of judgement but deliberate lies, criminal and in breach of his fiduciary duties to HIH as a director.

Adler was also disqualified from acting as a director of any company for 20 years; ordered to pay compensation jointly with Adler Corporation Pty Limited and Ray Williams of approximately A$7 million; and ordered to pay a pecuniary penalty of A$450,000. Adler Corporation Pty Limited was also ordered to pay a pecuniary penalty of A$450,000.

Following his conviction, Adler was taken to the maximum security Metropolitan Remand and Reception Centre and following initial classification, was placed in Long Bay Correctional Centre, before being transferred to the minimum security Kirkconnell Correctional Centre in late April 2005. However, less than two months later, Adler was transferred to the higher security Bathurst Correctional Centre after allegedly secretly restarting his business career from within the Kirkconnell facility. On 13 October 2007, Adler was released from the St Heliers Correctional Centre in the Upper Hunter Valley on parole, after serving two and a half years of his sentence, spending time in eight different correctional facilities. Adler described the prison system as "Darwinian, degrading, outdated, boring and pointless" in an article written for The Bulletin magazine in December 2007. During his time in solitary confinement, Adler befriended an individual in the next cell, as they were communicating through the acoustics of the toilet in their respective cells. They formed a deep friendship, something he spoke about with media. In 2020, Adler pleaded for leniency for a debtor who failed to disclose his bankruptcy in obtaining a loan from Adler.

== Career since release ==
Adler has involved himself in various causes, including helping to promote the "Turn Friday Night into Family Night" initiative of charismatic rabbi Shmuley Boteach, reportedly discussing the initiative with Pope Benedict XVI in May 2010 during the Pope's weekly audience in St Peter's Square.

His business interests include short-term financing, equity investment, venture capital, property development and financial advice.

In 2009 a St Kilda East synagogue, the Sassoon Yehuda Sephardi Centre, conferred naming rights on extensions to the synagogue, entitled the Lyndi and Rodney Adler Sephardi Centre. The estate of a late community member, Albert Yehuda, whose family was already commemorated in the centre's name commenced legal action that ended in the Supreme Court of Victoria. In bringing the case before the courts, the estate claimed that "...there is evidence the Adlers are desirous of re-establishing themselves in society, particularly Jewish society. ... [we] consider it to be an affront for his name to be displaced by a name which included that of a notorious convicted criminal". The estate lost its case before the court, but this decision was overturned by the Victorian Court of Appeal.

In 2010, Adler was reported to be providing consulting services on ethical business practices. In 2011 it was reported that Adler had made investments in a range of energy and retail assets; while in 2012 it was reported he was associated with a Sydney office property syndicate.

== See also ==
- Ray Williams
- HIH Insurance
