= One.Tel =

Australian telecom corporation (1995–2001)

- Type: Public
- Traded as: ASX: ONE1
- Industry: Telecommunications
- Founded: 1995
- Founder: Jodee Rich; Brad Keeling
- Defunct: 2001
- Fate: Collapsed

One.Tel was an Australian-based telecommunications company established in 1995 soon after deregulation of the Australian telecommunications industry.

Established by Jodee Rich and Brad Keeling, it and had high-profile backers such as the Murdoch and Packer families. James Packer and Lachlan Murdoch sat on the board of the company.

One.Tel attempted to create a youth-oriented image to sell their mobile phones and One.Net internet services. It became Australia's fourth largest telecommunications company before collapsing in 2001.

The company's slogan was "You'll tell your friends about One.Tel", aimed at drawing the connection between the brand and personal communication. The company also had a cartoon mascot known as "The Dude". The Dude was a cartoon-like depiction of a man in his early twenties, drawn by Adam Long, Jodee Rich's brother-in-law.

== History ==
One.Tel began operations in May 1995. In 1999 ,One.Tel's Next Generation 3GSM 1800 network was launched by joint CEOs of the mobile business, Stephen Moore and David Wright, in Sydney, Australia.

The original thought process began with a simple initiative: they wanted to start a new telephone company, one that the average person would understand. The company was very people focused and focused on the residential market, as opposed to corporate business. They wanted the consumer, or everyday person in the street, to have access to the entire suite of telephony products, which is why the company was marketed with the catch phrase "100% Telephone Company".

At that time, the company was firmly established in the telecommunications market, with operations throughout Australia and internationally, including London, Paris, Amsterdam, Zürich, Frankfurt and Hong Kong.

One.Tel had three core product offerings: fixed wire long distance, Internet service provision and mobile telephony.

From 1998 through to 2000, One.Tel's customer base more than tripled to 2.2 million and revenues doubled to $653 million. The business grew rapidly in Europe.

In December 1998, Project GSM was developed by Jodee Rich, Bradley Keeling, Kevin Beck, Stephen Moore and Alicia Crisp. This initial concept became the foundation for the One.Tel Next Gen 3GSM cellular network in Australia and spawned the international hybrid MVNO concept developed by One.Tel CTO Stephen Moore.

In February 1999, News Corp Australia and Publishing & Broadcasting Limited (PBL) injected $709 million over three years.

In March 2000, One.Tel was successful in acquiring 15 MHz spectrum across all major capital cities. The One.Tel Next Generation Network was launched nationally six months ahead of schedule. It was the most technologically advanced network in Australia and offered differentiating features via a Smart SIM, including 'Voicemail with Reply Now', 'Megaphone' and location-based information-on-demand services – features that are now commonplace today.

By May 2000, One.Tel had operations in seven countries and regions (Australia, UK, HKSAR, Netherlands, France, Switzerland, Germany), over 1,900,000 active customers and was connecting over 250,000/month globally.

=== The pre-IPO years: 1995 to 1997 ===
Jodee Rich and Brad Keeling decided to start a telephone company in August 1994. Jodee Rich developed a business plan for the company in September 1994. The ownership structure of the company in February 1995 was: Optus 28.5%; FAI 18%; James Packer 5%; Kalara Investments 50% (approximately). Kalara Investments was owned by Jodee Rich and Brad Keeling. The total initial seed capital for One.Tel was approximately $5 million. One.Tel was officially launched by Rodney Adler on 1 May 1995.

In its annual report for the year ended 30 June 1997, One.Tel reported revenue of $148 million and a before tax profit of $7.5 million. At that time the company had almost 300 staff.

=== From IPO to the onset of problems: 1997 to 2000 ===
One.Tel floated on the Australian Securities Exchange at $2 per share in November 1997. Initial market capitalization was $208 million. On paper, FAI had turned a $950,000 investment into $51 million; Packer had turned $250,000 into $17 million and Rich and Keeling had a combined stake worth well over $100 million.

In addition, the company had paid out $4 million in dividends and $2.85 million in consulting fees to Rich, Keeling, FAI and Packer.

The original shareholders also received $16.9 million for the sale of two businesses, One.Net and One.Card, to One.Tel in July 1998.

In the financial year ended 30 June 1998, One.Tel reported a before tax profit of $8.8 million. During the year, the company had commenced a "Global Strategy", opening offices in Los Angeles, London, Paris, Frankfurt, Hong Kong, Amsterdam and Zürich.

In September 1998, the company purchased mobile spectrum in each of the Australian capital cities at a cost of $9.5 million with a view to establishing its own mobile network. The company was unable to secure bank finance for the deal, and James Packer and David Lowy provided $5 million each to fund the purchase.

In December 1998, the Packer-controlled Consolidated Press Holdings purchased FAI's 16 million shares for $43 million. In February 1999, the Packer-controlled Publishing & Broadcasting Limited, in conjunction with News Corp Australia, agreed to provide $710 million in return for a 40% stake in the company. The One.Tel share price hit a high of $13.55 in the days leading up to the announcement of the deal, prompting an insider-trading probe by the Australian Securities & Investments Commission. The News/PBL deal allowed the original shareholders to take more money from the company.

In the financial year ended 30 June 1999, One.Tel reported a before tax profit of $9.8 million.

The most remarkable day in the history of One.Tel was 23 November 1999. Lucent Technologies announced that it would build and finance a European GSM mobile network for One.Tel at a cost of up to US$10 billion. The company's market capitalisation reached a high of A$5.3 billion on 26 November 1999, making it one of Australia's largest 30 companies.

=== The emergence of problems: the year 2000 ===
In March 2000, One.Tel spent $523 million on purchasing additional Australian spectrum licenses. The Packer and Murdoch families provided a further $280 million in funding. Australian investors provided $340 million in funding.

In the financial year ended 30 June 2000, One.Tel reported a loss of $291 million. The share price plummeted to below $1. The annual report included details of the remuneration of Rich and Keeling; both received a $560,000 basic salary and a $6.9 million bonus.

=== The end: 2001 ===
In January 2001, Jodee met with Kerry Packer who told him, "You ran out of money with Imagineering, and you're going to do it again". A Macquarie Bank report stated that the company was worth $3.5 billion, and the share price doubled within days. Merrill Lynch predicted that the company would run out of money by April.

In February, director Rodney Adler sold five million shares for $2.5 million.

During April and May, the company's problems became increasingly apparent. In a final attempt to give the company a chance to survive, News Corp and PBL agreed to subscribe to a rights issue at 5 cents per share to supply another $132 million in much needed cash. News Corp and PBL reneged upon the agreement later in May when further evidence of One.Tel's financial problems emerged.

The directors appointed Ferrier Hodgson as administrator on 29 May, 2001. The administrator's report states that the company was insolvent by March 2001. The administrator began laying off the 1,400 employees of One.Tel on 8 June, 2001.

=== Litigation ===
On 14 October, 2005, the Sydney Morning Herald reported that the personal diaries of James Packer would be made available to the Australian Securities & Investments Commission (ASIC) to assist in its case against Jodee Rich. The Supreme Court of New South Wales ruled that the diaries should be made available to ASIC but warned that the material should not be used "in a manner that simply raises prurient or titillatory interest that is not directly relevant to the case". ASIC was reportedly seeking compensation of $92 million from Jodee Rich and the former One.Tel finance director Mark Silbermann on the basis that they did not exercise their powers with respect to the company with due care and diligence.

On 18 November, 2009, Justice Austin dismissed ASIC's civil proceedings against Rich and Silbermann. Following a four-year trial, lasting 232 hearing days, Justice Austin found that ASIC had failed to prove its case against the defendant directors. The evidence presented by ASIC did not establish on the balance of probabilities that the defendants had failed to disclose or withhold financial information from One.Tel's board regarding the company's true financial position.

In the decision, Justice Austin was critical of the way that ASIC managed the case. In particular:

- ASIC's evidentiary case was too big. The core of ASIC's claim required it to prove the true financial position of the large multinational One.Tel group over a period of four months in order to establish not one but many breaches of the defendant directors’ statutory duty of care and diligence. The ambitious evidentiary case in ASIC v Rich should be contrasted with ASIC's more recent litigation against directors and officers which has aimed to target specific conduct
- ASIC made final submissions that were outside its pleaded case and the defendant directors were not given a proper opportunity to respond to them
- ASIC failed to call witnesses who would have been able to explain ambiguous documentary evidence
- ASIC used a forensic accountant as an expert witness when that person had helped ASIC decide what course of action to take against the defendants, and
- ASIC's argument that One.Tel's liquidity should be assessed solely on its Australian operations was unsound because its treasury activities were conducted on a consolidated multinational basis.

These criticisms led Justice Austin to observe that "there is a real question whether ASIC should ever bring civil proceedings seeking to prove so many things over such a period of time as in this case."

== One.Tel abroad ==
Centrica acquired the UK business of One.Tel in 2001 and ran it successfully for some years. On 15 October, 2005, Centrica stated that it wished to sell the UK One.Tel to concentrate on its oil and gas businesses. On 19 December, 2005, The Carphone Warehouse announced that it was buying the company to merge its customers with its TalkTalk telecommunications offering. The One.Tel UK business was retained as a separate operating company, and not merged into the main TalkTalk Group business. In late 2007, the One.Tel name was abolished for new customer acquisition in favour of the TalkTalk brand, though the brand existed (in 2014) for existing customers as 'onetel'.

Scarlet acquired the Dutch business of One.Tel in 2001, eventually phasing out the name when the Scarlet brand in The Netherlands was rebranded Stipte in June 2014.

== See also ==
- Open Telecommunications, a company with the same backers
