= HIH Insurance =

Former Australian insurance company

HIH Insurance Ltd
- Formerly: CE Heath International Holdings Limited (1988–1996); HIH Winterthur International Holdings Limited (1996–1998)
- Type: Public
- Traded as: ASX: HIH; ASX: HNZ
- Industry: Health insurance
- Founded: 6 April 1988; 38 years ago in Canberra, ACT, Australia
- Defunct: 15 March 2001
- Fate: Provisional liquidation
- Headquarters: Canberra, Australia
- Area served: Australia
- Website: HIH Insurance at the Wayback Machine (archived 2001-02-02)

Corporate failure of HIH Insurance
- HIH Insurance corporate logo
- Inquiries: Royal Commission into HIH Insurance
- Convicted: Ray Williams; Rodney Adler; Brad Cooper

HIH Insurance was Australia's second-largest insurance company before it was placed into provisional liquidation on 15 March 2001. The demise of HIH is considered to be the largest corporate collapse in Australia's history, with liquidators estimating that HIH's losses totalled up to $5.3 billion. Investigations into the cause of the collapse have led to conviction and imprisonment of a handful of members of HIH management on various charges relating to fraud. A royal commission was formed in the wake of the collapse. It also led to the 2002 Review of the Law of Negligence led by David Ipp and subsequent tort reform.

== History ==
In 1968, Ray Williams and Michael Payne formed M W Payne Underwriting Agency Pty Ltd, which was acquired in 1971 by British company CE Heath plc. Ray Williams was appointed to the board of CE Heath in 1980. The business operations of CE Heath were subsequently transferred to CE Heath International Holdings Limited in 1989 with CE Heath plc retaining 90% ownership of CE Heath International Holdings. In 1992, CE Heath International Holdings floated on the Australian Securities Exchange.

In 1995, CE Heath International Holdings acquired CIC Insurance Group. The remaining 48% holding that CE Heath PLC maintained in CE Heath International Holdings was sold to a subsidiary of CIC Insurance Group called CIC Holdings Limited. CIC Holdings increased its share in CE Heath International Holdings to 50% and CIC Holdings was purchased by Winterthur. In May 1996, CE Heath International Holdings changed its name to HIH Winterthur.

Through 1997 and 1998, HIH Winterthur acquired a large number of companies both in Australia and globally, including Colonial Ltd General Insurance's operations in Australia and New Zealand, Solart in Argentina and Great States Insurance Co in the United States. Most notably, however, HIH acquired the large Australian insurance company FAI Insurance, whose chief executive Rodney Adler became a director of HIH in 1999. Winterthur Swiss sold its 51% share in HIH Winterthur to the public and HIH changed its name to HIH Insurance Limited.

== Collapse ==
With $8 billion in assets, HIH was considered one of Australia's largest insurance firms. However, after offsetting its assets with debts and potential insurance claims against the company, HIH was left, on paper, with net assets of only $133 million. McGrath & Riddell described HIH's solvency as "marginal" and stated in their report that "an extremely small movement (just 1.7%) in the value of assets could move the balance sheet into net asset deficiency." That is, even the slightest setback would cause the company to become insolvent.

On 15 March 2001, the board of HIH appointed a provisional liquidator to take control of HIH and 17 of its controlled entities. The board hoped this would give HIH time to review its operations and assess its financial position. On the same day, HIH was to announce its first-half result for the six months to 31 December 2000. The announcement had already been delayed once and rumours suggested that HIH's first-half result was a loss of $100 million. This figure quickly ballooned to $200 million, and then $300 million. Although the result was never announced, when Tony McGrath announced his appointment as provisional liquidator he estimated that HIH had lost over $800 million over the six months to 31 December 2000. He attributed the HIH company failures to rapid expansion, unsupervised delegation of authority, extensive and complex reinsurance arrangements, under-pricing, reserve problems, false reports, reckless management, incompetence, fraud, greed, and self-dealing.

Formal winding-up orders were made on 27 August 2001. By then, HIH liquidators estimated the deficiency of the group to be between $3.6 billion and $5.3 billion. The demise of HIH was the largest corporate failure in Australia's history.

HIH insurance is currently in run–off, which means it is managing its outstanding claims and not writing any new business. On 11 April 2011 the provisional liquidator said that it could be up to 10 years before all creditors are paid.

== Royal commission ==
On 21 May 2001 Prime Minister John Howard announced that a royal commission would be established to inquire into the company's collapse. Justice Neville John Owen headed the royal commission, which tabled its report to Parliament on 16 April 2003. The findings of the royal commission were available on the HIH Royal Commission web site which has been archived by the National Library of Australia.

== Criminal charges and sentences ==
=== Adler pleads guilty ===
Former HIH director Rodney Adler was sentenced on 14 April 2005 to 4 1/2 years in prison, with a non-parole period of 2 1/2 years. Adler's sentence came after pleading guilty on 16 February 2005 to four criminal charges, which included:

- two counts of disseminating information knowing it was false
- one count of obtaining money by false or misleading statements
- one count of being intentionally dishonest and failing to discharge his duties as a director in good faith and in the best interests of the company

The sentence was a lenient one, since the judge accepted the defendant's plea of mitigation, citing that he had not sold any of his own shares, or personally benefitted from his actions.

==== Stock market manipulation ====
Criminal charges for stock market manipulation were laid against Adler after an investigation by the Australian Securities & Investments Commission (ASIC) into the purchase of HIH shares by Pacific Eagle Equities Pty Ltd, an Adler-controlled company. Pacific Eagle Equities purchased 1,873,661 HIH shares on 15 June 2000, 951,339 HIH shares on 16 June 2000 and 425,000 HIH shares on 19 June 2000 with HIH funds after Adler persuaded Ray Williams to shift $10 million from HIH to Pacific Eagle Equities. Adler's defence team negotiated with the Commonwealth Director of Public Prosecutions to drop charges of stock market manipulation in exchange for a guilty plea to other charges.

==== Disseminating false information ====
Adler attempted to induce investors to purchase HIH shares by telling a finance journalist on 19 June 2000 and 20 June 2000 that he had purchased 1,873,661 HIH shares on 15 June 2000 and 951,339 HIH shares on 16 June 2000 for himself. Adler also told the journalist that he believed the share price for HIH was undervalued and presented an opportunity for a quick profit.

==== Intentionally acting dishonestly ====
In October 2000, a company in which Adler had an interest, Business Thinking Systems (BTS), was in financial trouble. Adler sought a $2 million investment from HIH. Williams had been told by Adler that the company had raised $2.5 million, which it had not, and that Adler was prepared to invest $500,000, which he had no intention of doing, if HIH invested $2 million in BTS. HIH executive John Ballhausen was then told by Adler that he had invested the $500,000. The HIH board discussed and approved the $2 million investment in BTS in a November 2000 meeting. Adler attended the meeting and failed to disclose his financial interest in the business. Nor did he disclose his knowledge of its financial affairs. In April 2005 Adler was sentenced to 4 1/2 years in prison.

On 13 October 2007, Adler was released from the St Heliers Correctional Centre in the Hunter Valley on parole, after serving 2 1/2 years of his sentence. However, in November 2007, he faced court in a NSW civil case related to bonuses he recommended for executives of the failed telco One.Tel. Adler was on One.Tel's remuneration committee.

=== Other charges ===
On 15 April 2005, Ray Williams was sentenced to 4 years and 6 months' jail with a non-parole period of 2 years and 9 months, after pleading guilty to misleading shareholders about the financial position of HIH. Williams was also banned from leading an Australian corporation for ten years. On 14 January 2008, Williams was released from jail after serving just under three years.

Sydney businessman Brad Cooper was sentenced in the Supreme Court on 23 June 2006, after a jury found him guilty on 13 charges relating to bribes he paid a senior HIH official to push through false claims in the months before the insurer's collapse. He was sentenced to 8 years' jail with a non-parole period of 5 years. Cooper reportedly admitted to having a cocaine addiction during his high-flying days when he worked as a motivational speaker and as a salesman. At the time he entered jail in October 2005, Australian media stated he reported to prison officials that he had further addictions to painkillers, dex-amphetamines, and was on a valium addiction program. Prior to his arrest, he had begun a relationship with Sascha Ricci Griffin, and she continued their relationship with visits to him in court and jail, until his release in late 2010. Cooper filed an appeal from jail against the severity of his sentence, but the NSW Court of Criminal Appeal dismissed the application in March 2009.

On 21 November 2008, it was reported that a charge had been dropped against former HIH chairman Geoffrey Cohen a week before it was due to be heard in Sydney's Downing Centre Local Court. The decision by the Commonwealth Director of Public Prosecutions not to proceed followed a similar decision in February 2008 relating to a more serious charge. Both were laid in 2005. Both abandoned charges related to Cohen's address to shareholders at the HIH annual general meeting in December 2000. In the second charge, ASIC alleged Cohen did not take reasonable steps to ensure that the information he gave to the shareholders at annual meeting was not misleading about a joint venture between Allianz Australia Ltd (Allianz) and HIH. The first charge alleged Cohen knowingly misled investors.
