= Cranbrook School, Sydney =

Cranbrook School

Location
- Bellevue Hill and Rose Bay, New South Wales; Australia; 33°52′15″S 151°15′9″E

Information
- Type: Independent early learning, primary and secondary day and boarding school
- Motto: Latin: Esse Quam Videri (To be, rather than to seem to be)
- Denomination: Anglican
- Established: 1918; 108 years ago
- Founder: Frederick T. Perkins
- President of Council: Geoff Lovell
- Head of School: Dr Anne Johnstone
- Head of the Senior School / Deputy Headmaster: Bob Meakin
- Head of the Junior School: Michele Marquet OAM
- Chaplain: Rev'd Roderick Farraway
- Employees: c. 187
- Years: Early learning and K–12
- Gender: Co-educational (2026–present); Boys (1918–present)
- Enrolment: c. 1,780 (2026)
- Colours: Red, white and blue
- Affiliations: International Coalition of Boys' Schools; Association of Heads of Independent Schools of Australia; Junior School Heads Association of Australia; Australian Boarding Schools' Association; Headmasters' and Headmistresses' Conference; Combined Associated Schools
- Alumni: Old Cranbrookians
- Website: www.cranbrook.nsw.edu.au

Cranbrook School is an independent Anglican day and boarding school, with multiple campuses in Sydney's eastern suburbs, within New South Wales, Australia for students from pre-school to year 12. The school was founded in 1918 with the Rev'd Frederick Thomas Perkins as the first headmaster. Cranbrook has a non-selective enrolment policy and currently caters for approximately 1,680 students from early learning (4 years old) to Year 12 (18 years old), including 80 boarders from Years 7 to 12. Cranbrook is affiliated with the Association of Heads of Independent Schools of Australia (AHISA), the Junior School Heads Association of Australia (JSHAA), the Australian Boarding Schools' Association (ABSA), and the Headmasters' and Headmistresses' Conference. It is a founding member of the Combined Associated Schools (CAS) and the Independent Sporting Association (ISA).

== History ==
On 1 December 1917, the former private home and vice-regal residence, Cranbrook, was bought at auction by an agent for the businessman Samuel Hordern. He was the main financial benefactor of a group of businessmen and churchmen aiming to establish an Anglican boys' school in the Eastern Suburbs.

From December 1917 to June 1918, a provisional committee of twelve, comprising the founders and six additional men, prepared for the opening of the new school. They held meetings, ensured building renovations were completed, drew up the first articles of association and appointed the first Headmaster, Rev'd F. T. Perkins.

On 6 June 1918, the provisional committee reformed itself as the first council of Cranbrook School and organised the official opening of the school for 22 July 1918.

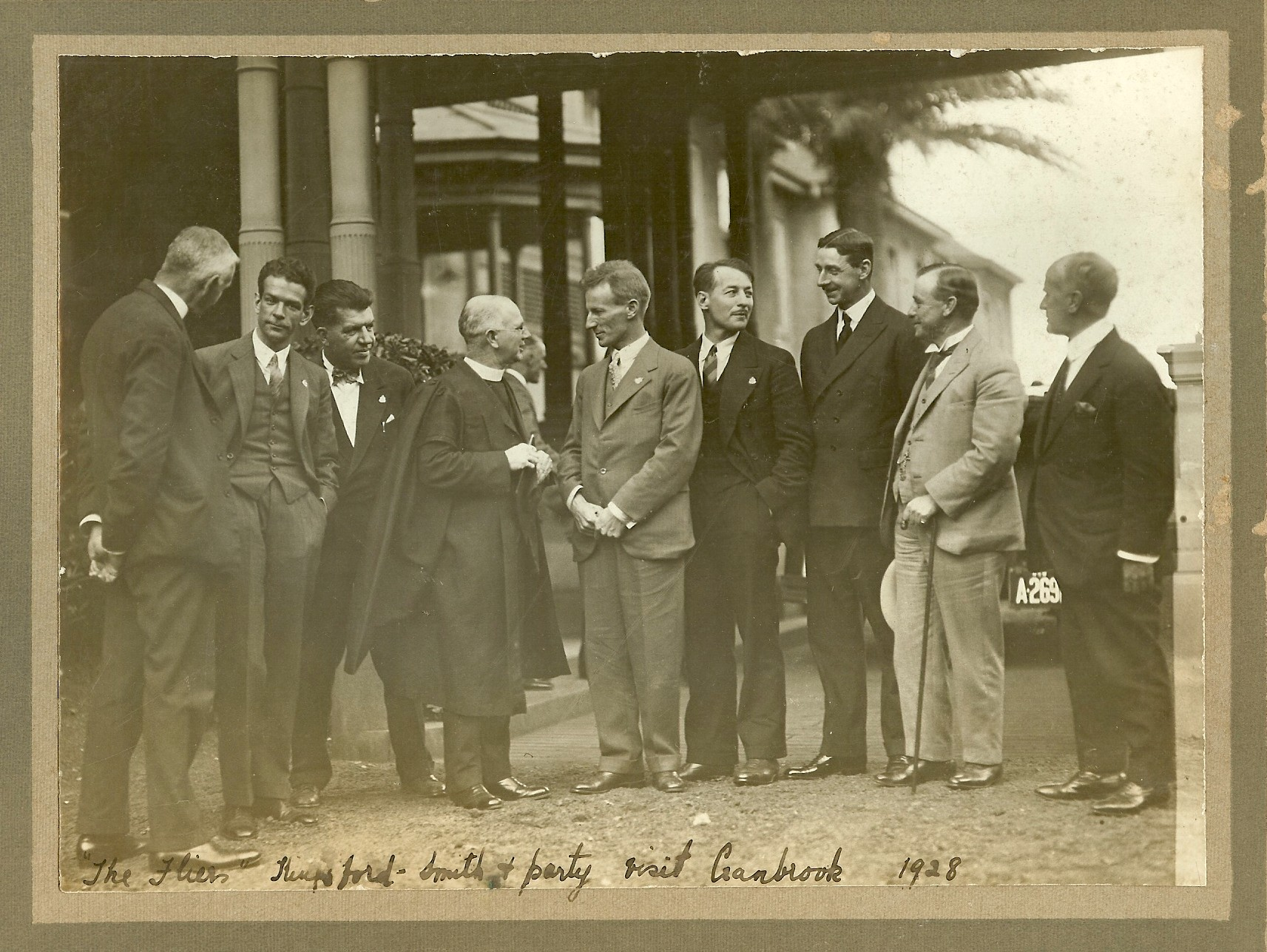
Charles Kingsford Smith during a visit to Cranbrook in 1928

In July 2022, parents of students were informed that the whole senior school would be fully co-ed by 2029 with girls in Years 7 and 11 being enrolled from 2026, and other years being slowly integrated year by year. This integration method was based on Barker College's co-ed integration in 2020. In March 2024, the school was featured in a Four Corners investigation into allegations of a toxic workplace and sexist student culture, led by some former teachers. The report also raised questions around Government funding for Cranbrook School and its level of accountability for this.

In 2026, as a part of the King's Birthday Honours List, the Head of the Junior School, Michele Marquet, was awarded an Medal of the Order of Australia (OAM) for service to primary education.

=== Headmasters ===
Ordinal	Photo	Headmaster	Tenure
1		Frederick Perkins	1918–1932
2		Iven Mackay	1933–1939
3		Brian Hone	1940–1951
4		Gethyn Hewan	1951–1963
5		Mark Bishop OBE	1963–1985
6		Bruce Carter AM	1985–2000
7		Jeremy Madin	2001–2012
8		Nicholas Sampson	2012–2024 (Term 2)
Interim		Michele Marquet OAM	2024 (Term 3)–2025 (Term1)
Interim		Stuart Meade	2025 (Term 2)
9		Dr Anne Johnstone	2025 (Term 3)–Present

== Campuses ==
Cranbrook School is situated over five campuses; the Senior School (Years 7 to 12) are located on the main campus in suburban Bellevue Hill, while the Junior School, for students from Kindergarten to Year 6, is located in nearby Rose Bay. There are 2 pre-schools that Cranbrook offer: St Mark's in Darling Point and St Michael's in Vaucluse. The final campus is Wolgan Valley, a residential education site with an emphasis on experiential learning. It was closed from late 2022 due to torrential rainfall which resulted in landslides that took out the main road. It is set to reopen sometime in 2027.

== School Operation ==
=== House System ===
Cranbrook has a system of houses across the campuses. This system was created in 1931 as a way to organise students for a variety of sporting and intellectual competitions. It continues to this day as a way for students to socialise better between different year groups, where senior students would be acting as leaders to junior students within the House. In the Senior School there are a total of 14 houses. There are 12 day-houses, with about 80-150 students in each (~15 in each year group), and also two boarding houses with around 40 students each. The students attend a pastoral period every day where they engage with mentors and other peers in their house.

Senior School Houses
House	Colour	Day or Boarding House	Housemaster	Tenure
Chelmsford		Day House	Fiona Burgess	2023–Present
Cutler		Day House	Ashley Fisher	(Acting) 2026-Present
Davidson		Day House	Simon Pardey	c.2018–Present
Harvey		Day House	Dean Michniewicz	c.2022–Present
Hewan		Day House	Miles Sinclair	(Acting) 2026–Present
Hone		Day House	Dane Drivas	2023–Present
Northcott		Day House	Chelsea Slender	2025–Present
Perkins		Day House	Hannah Bamford	2024–Present
Rawson		Boarding House	Ewan Uncles	2025–Present
Street		Boarding House	Bradley Gill	Unknown–Present
Strickland		Day House	Nick Tsoukatos	2025–Present
Thomas		Day House	Kelly O'Shea	2024–Present
Wakehurst		Day House	Sarah Infanti	(Acting) 2026-present
Woodward		Day House	Josie Ableson	2026–Present

Junior School Houses
House	Colour
Dangar House	
Hordern House	
Ingram House	
Moyes House	
Potter House	
Warry House	

=== Student Leadership ===
Prefects are appointed at the beginning of Term 4 of each year. Each house starts with four prefects (one Student Head of House and three House Prefects), and an additional prefect is usually appointed in Term 1 or Term 2 of the following year. All leadership terms are one year in length.

==== Roles ====
Senior Prefect: a select few boys (or girls) who represent the highest level of seniority within the student body at Cranbrook. Their role is to represent and guide the student body on a wholistic level, yet they hold little influence over policy changes. Their impact is displayed mainly through leading the prefect body through the heads of houses to organise assemblies, videos, and occasional initiatives to varying success. The senior prefects meet on a bi-weekly basis with the student heads of houses. A senior prefect cannot be a head of house, nor a captain of co-curricular.

Student Head of House (Prefect): a male student, or, a male and female student (since 2027) that directly manages the other house prefects. Their role is to lead each house by socialising and understanding students, organise events and initiatives, plan house assemblies, plan house events, and contribute to the wider school community. Their impact is more direct than the senior prefects. They meet with their prefects and their housemaster ex tempore to discuss a variety of issues. A student head of house is a prefect and can be a captain of co-curricular.

House Prefect: a student who is selected to lead the school and support their house, profile, and the broader school on a whole. Each prefect is attached to their house, and then a profile (either academic, community, or co-curricular) which is guided by the senior prefect for that profile. Each profile meets on a bi-weekly basis. Until 2026, all prefects held the ability to hand out prefect detentions, which were removed in 2027. A prefect can be a captain of co-curricular.

Captain of Co-Curriculars: each co-curricular has a captain, and sometimes a vice captain, depending on the co-curricular. Their role is to ensure the success and growth of each respective programme in conjunction with their head of the co-curricular. These individuals do not need to be prefects, and exist outside of the prefect hierarchy. In rare cases, co-curricular captains can be in Year 11, but are usually in Year 12.

Student Representative Council: each house elects one senior and one junior representative, including one female senior representative (as of 2026). These students are responsible for voicing the concerns, inquiries, feedback and ideas to the school and the Senior Leadership Team. The SRC hosts and runs school-wide events and initiatives, alongside handling general concerns.

==== Structure ====
===== Pre-2025 =====
1. Senior Prefects: Head Boy and Second Head Boy
2. 12 Student Heads of Houses (14 since 2024)
3. 3-5 Prefects per House (including the Head of House and Senior Prefects)

===== 2025–2026 =====
1. Senior Prefects: Head Boy, Second Head Boy, Academic Prefect, Community Prefect, and Co-Curricular Prefect
2. 14 Student Heads of House (due to more houses)
3. 4-6 Prefects per House, divided into (including the Head of House and Senior Prefects)

== Curriculum ==
Starting from Pre-Schools, the school uses the IB framework to teach the NSW curriculum through to Year 12. Cranbrook School offers the IB Diploma Programme as an alternative pathway to the HSC credential. It uses the International Baccalaureate MYP program in years 7-10 as well as the holistic PYP program in the Junior School.

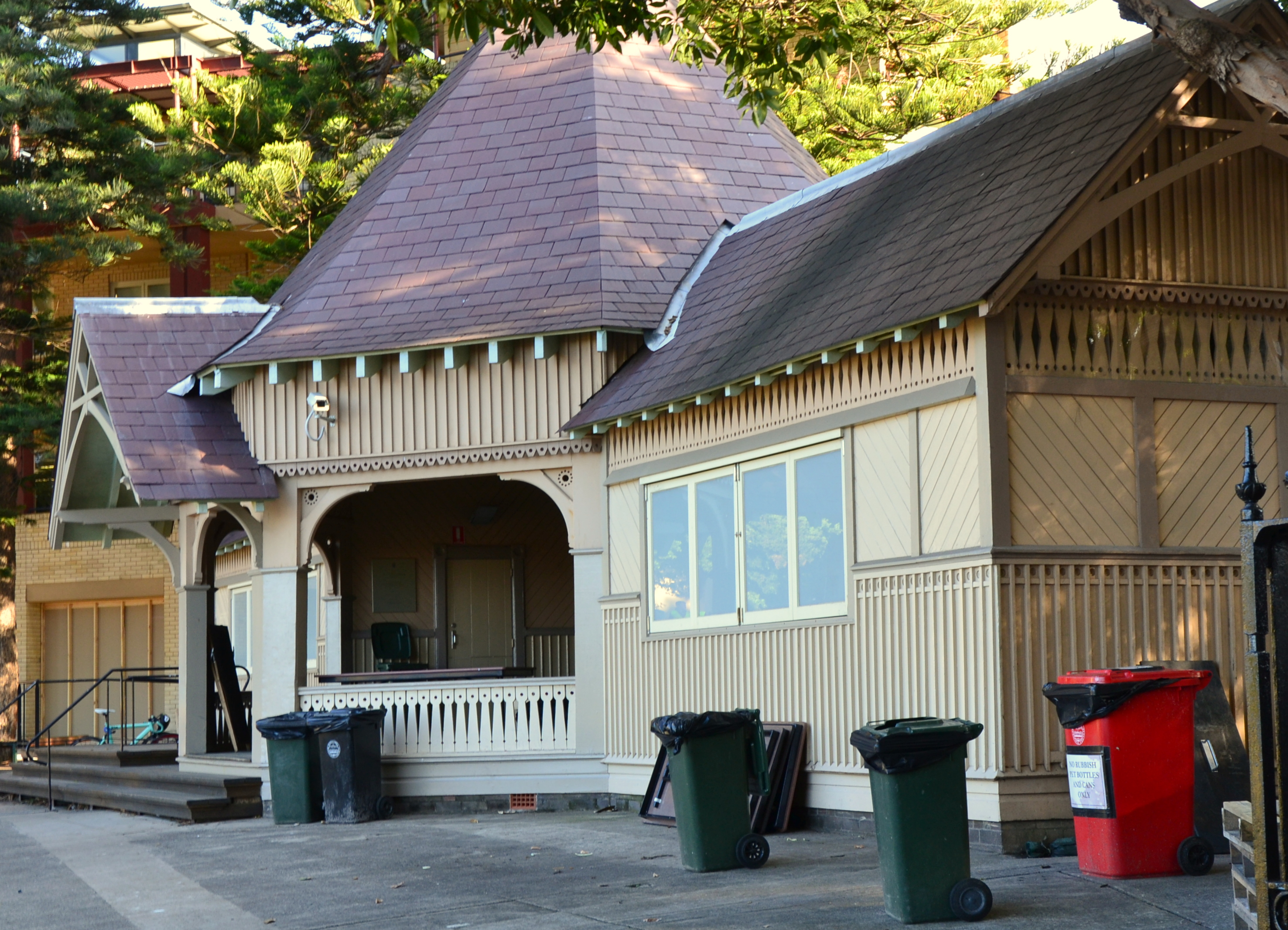
Cranbrook Sports Pavilion was designed by John Horbury Hunt and is heritage-listed.

== Sport ==
Cranbrook School is a member of the Combined Associated Schools (CAS).

=== CAS premierships ===
Cranbrook School has won the following CAS premierships.

- Athletics (7) – 1930, 1934, 1936, 1943, 1951, 1952, 1965
- Basketball – 2007
- Chess - 2001
- Cricket (8) – 1935, 1989, 1998, 2020, 2021, 2022, 2023, 2024
- Cross Country (10) – 2009, 2010, 2011, 2012, 2013, 2016, 2017, 2022, 2023, 2026
- Debating - 1995, 1999 (joint), 2001 (joint), 2013, 2018 (joint), 2024 (joint), 2025 (joint)
- Rugby (13) – 1930, 1931, 1933, 1943, 1960, 1969, 1972, 1973, 1982, 1984, 1985, 1994, 2014
- Swimming (8) – 1942, 1944, 1945, 1949, 1950, 1955, 1974, 1976

== Notable alumni ==
Alumni of Cranbrook School are known as "Old Cranbrookians" and may elect to join the school's alumni association, the Old Cranbrookians' Association (OCA).

== Controversies and criticisms ==
=== Antisemitic incidents ===
In 2022, there were reports that three students were the targets of antisemitic behaviour by fellow students. Later, video footage of a student doing a Nazi salute emerged. In September 2022, the school announced an internal review to look into it. Cranbrook has said it had built an improved and centralised incident behaviour register and strengthened its alliances with organisations including the NSW Jewish Board of Deputies.

=== Mass resignation from the School Board ===
In November 2022, 10 of the 11 members of Cranbrook School's council announced their resignation due to a deteriorating relationship between headmaster and school council president, as well as disagreement over plans to admit girls to the century-old boys’ school from 2026. Subsequently, on 25 November, former School Presidents, Helen Nugent AC and Roger Massy-Greene AM, formed an independent Nominations Committee to make recommendations to the current Council on nominations for new members of Council. 13 new Councillors were subsequently appointed.

=== Four Corners investigation and allegations of sexual harassment and toxic culture ===
In March 2024, the investigative journalism program Four Corners released an investigation about the alleged toxic and sexist "boys club" culture within the school's student body and leadership. Multiple former staff members and students were interviewed about sexual harassment of female staff. Former teaching staff described being sexually harassed, insulted, and threatened by students. A former teacher, who was blackmailed by a student saying he would claim she was abusing him if she did not send him sexual images, said that the incident was downplayed by Head of Senior School and Deputy Headmaster Bob Meakin, who allegedly stated that "because I'm young and, 'I'm just going to say it – attractive,' it's not [surprising] that I've received attention from the boys".

After the investigation was aired and published online, investigative journalist Louise Milligan stated that she, the ABC, and multiple other journalists had received several legal threats regarding the content of the investigation. Headmaster Nicholas Sampson was forced to resign by the school council later in the week after it was revealed that he had not disclosed information to the school council about a teacher who, early in his employment at Cranbrook, had sent explicit emails to a former student of his at another, previous school in which he described sexual fantasies about her and other female students he had previously taught. While the teacher was investigated by police and not found to have behaved criminally, Sampson had in 2015 been informed about the emails and, in addition to not informing the school council about them, appeared have glossed over the teacher's behaviour.

The episode included details of how a petition in 2021, by Chanel Contos received over 2,500 testimonies of sexual assault from high school students, with many testimonies referring to Cranbrook students, as well as students from other elite all-boys schools.

=== Government funding ===
Cranbrook received about $6.5 million in state and federal government funding in 2022. This is despite the school charging up to $46,000 per year for domestic students (not including boarding fees), paying their headmaster over $1 million per year, having $168 million in assets and running a $10 million profit as recently as 2019.

In 2021, Cranbrook spent more on works ($63.48 million) than the total public school capital expenditure of Tasmania and the Northern Territory combined ($62.4 million).

== See also ==
- List of non-government schools in New South Wales
- List of Anglican schools in New South Wales
- List of boarding schools in Australia
- Lawrence Campbell Oratory Competition
- Leura
