= Roslyn Packer =

Australian philanthropist

Roslyn Packer AC
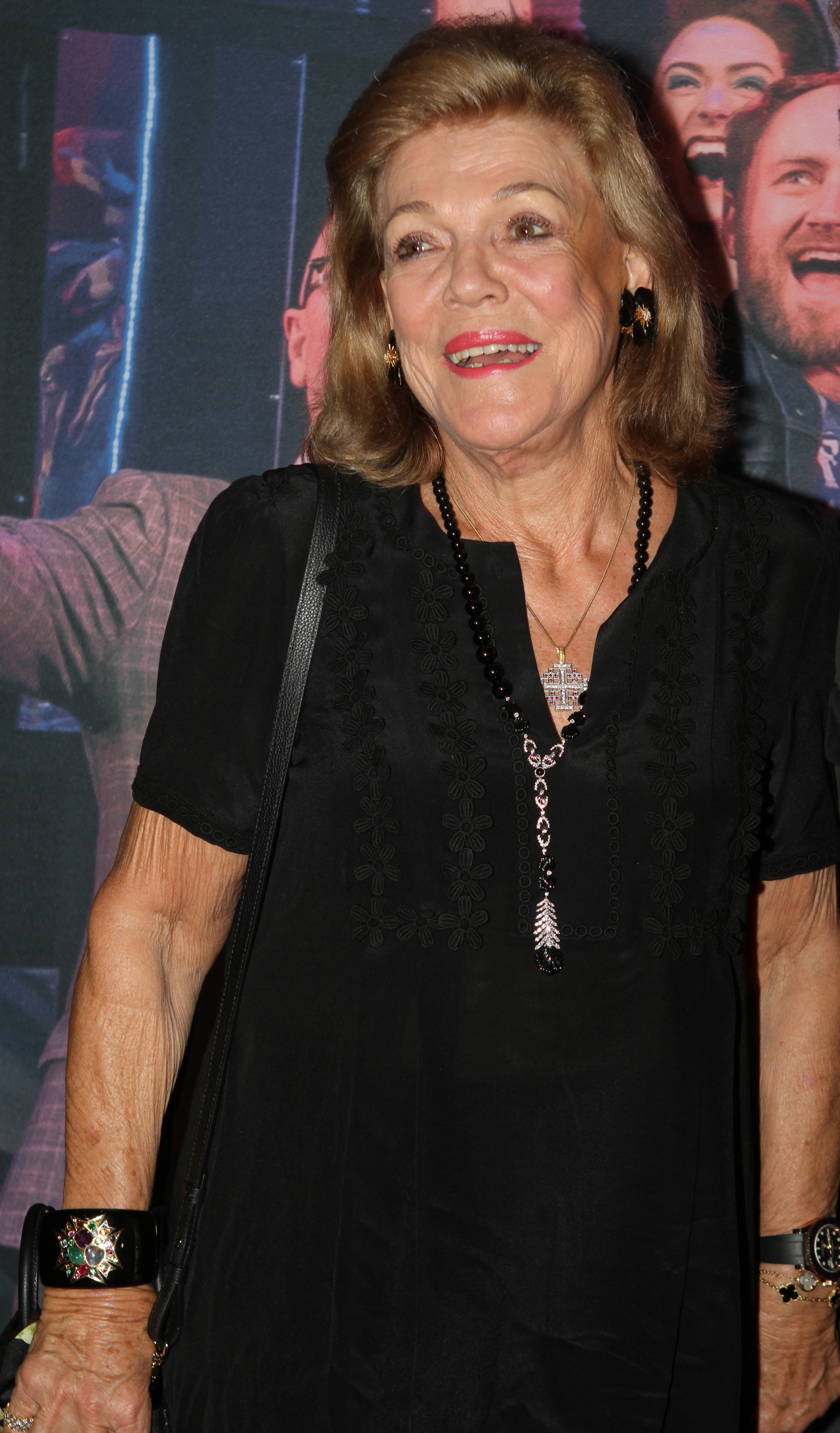
- Born: Roslyn Redman Weedon c. 1938 (aged 87–88 years); Sydney, New South Wales, Australia
- Known for: Philanthropy
- Spouse: Kerry Packer (m. 1963; died 2005)
- Children: 2 (James and Gretel Packer)
- Relatives: Packer family

Roslyn Redman Packer AC (born née Weedon, in c. 1938) is an Australian philanthropist and widow of media mogul Kerry Packer.

== Early life ==
Packer was born Roslyn Redman Weedon in Wagga Wagga, the daughter of Doctor Stephen Hertford Weedon and socialite Phyllis Bragg.

== Family ==
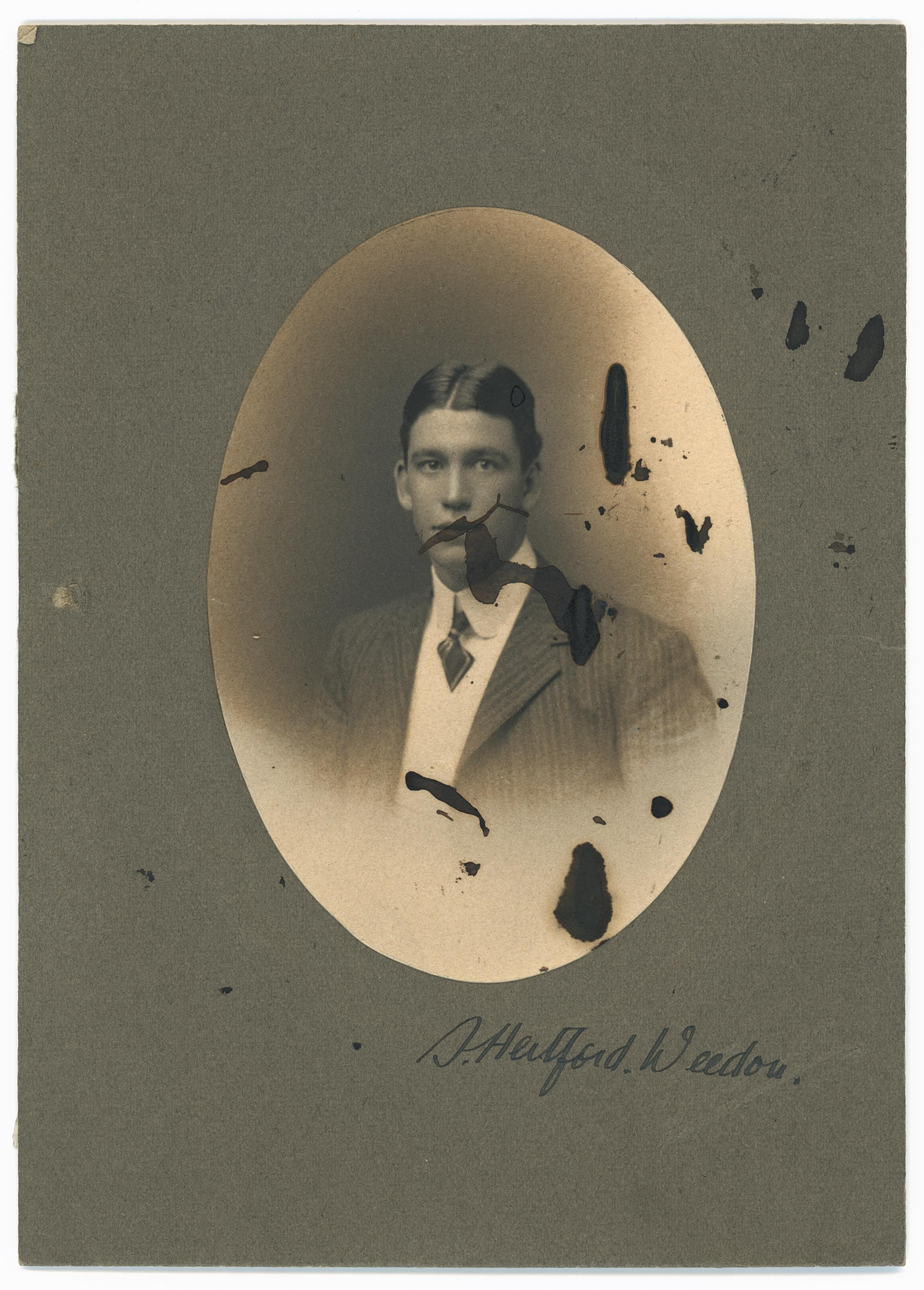
Portrait of Doctor Stephen Hertford Weedon of Wagga Wagga.

Packer’s parents were married on Saturday 1 September 1934 at Christ Church of England Cootamundra. The reception was held in the Wagga Wagga Town Hall. The honeymoon included a trip to Canberra followed by a cruise in Cairns. Packer’s mother was a native of Cootamundra, a town within the Riverina region of New South Wales. She was an organiser for the Country Women’s Association and followed various sports including hockey, golf and tennis. Packer’s father, Stephen Weedon, was born on 15 February 1887 and served in World War I as a medical officer holding the rank of major. Stephen Weedon departed Sydney on the HMAT Borda A3 on 17 October 1916. From 1923, Stephen Weedon, alongside Doctor Walter Wallace Martin, operated Welwyn Private Hospital on Simmons Street, Wagga Wagga. The hospital accommodated approximately 10 patients daily, the hospital was closed in March 1946 and was later sold to the Department of Main Roads on 26 July 1946. Stephen Weedon died 27 April 1965 in Double Bay.

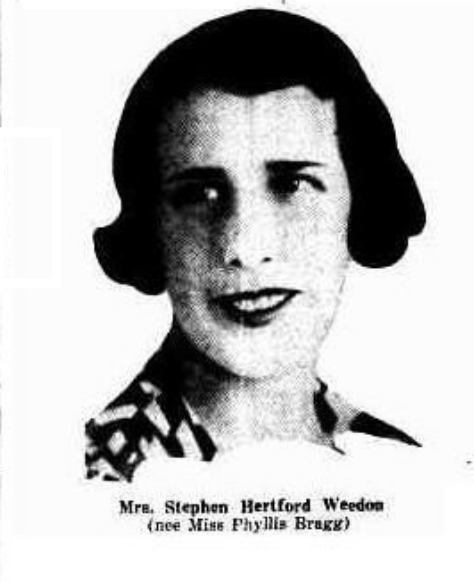
Portrait of Phyllis Weedon

=== Marriage to Kerry Packer ===
Packer married Kerry Packer at St Mark’s Church, Darling Point on 30 August 1963. The couple were married until Kerry Packer died of kidney failure on 26 December 2005. Speaking to the Australian Women's Weekly, Packer said: "I don't hear his voice so much anymore, but it was a good 18 months before the reality sank in that he isn't going to walk through the front door again ... that when the phone rings, it won't be him to say he'll be home soon." Packer has two children, James and Gretel Packer, with Kerry Packer.

=== Gretel Packer ===
Packer Family Tree

Packer's daughter, Gretel Lees Packer, married Nick Barham in July 1991 in Sussex. The wedding was held near the Packer family’s English estate of Fyning Hill. They have two children, Francesca and Ben. Gretel later married Shane Murray and they have one child named William. Packer and Murray married at a private ceremony 15 days before Kerry Packer’s death. Gretel Packer said of her late father, Kerry Packer:

"As a child, I didn't think that my life was at all unusual... as I grew older I realised what an incredible gift dad was..."

Gretel Packer established a $200 million National Philanthropic Fund on 22 July 2014. This fund was established under a 10 year joint commitment with Crown Resorts and the Packer Family Foundation. The funds have been distributed to not-for-profit organisations with a focus on Indigenous education, arts, culture, community welfare and medical research programs. As of the 2018/2019 Crown Resorts annual review, $83 million had been allocated to 300 grant recipients. Gretel Packer is a trustee of the Sydney Theatre Company Foundation, a board member of the Art Gallery of New South Wales and a member of the Taronga Zoo Foundation.

=== James Packer ===
James was educated briefly at Tudor House for two years. Packer visited James fortnightly by car and often stayed at Milton Park with the Baillieus — who were cousins of Kerry Packer. The manager of the Packer family’s Newcastle Waters Station, Dick Wilson, said about James Packer: "There was a lot of his mother in him and she was one of the nicest women you'll ever meet."

=== Inheritance dispute ===
Packer’s children, James and Gretel, were involved in a legal battle when dividing up Kerry Packer’s fortune. Roslyn helped "broker a peace treaty" between the two children. The settlement, negotiated in October 2015, included a A$1.25 billion portfolio of cash and preference shareholdings in Consolidated Press Holdings.

== Philanthropy ==
In 2007 Packer was appointed an Officer of the Order of Australia for service to the community as a major supporter of and fundraiser for a broad range of arts, cultural, medical research and health care organisations.

In 2016 Packer was appointed a Companion of the Order of Australia for eminent service to the community as a leading benefactor and patron, particularly to health care, medical research and social welfare groups, and to the visual and performing arts through philanthropic contributions. Packer's community involvement and philanthropy is extensive and spans many notable organisations including the St. Vincent's Private Hospital, the Victor Chang Cardiac Research Institute, the National Gallery of Australia, the Australian Ballet, Opera Australia, the Sydney Festival, the Sydney Theatre Company, the Sydney Symphony Orchestra, the Art Gallery of New South Wales, the Venice Biennale, the Sir Roden and Lady Cutler Foundation, Crown Resorts Foundation, the Packer Family Foundation, and the Hunter Valley Community Foundation.

=== Roslyn Packer Theatre Walsh Bay ===
Previously named Sydney Theatre, the Roslyn Packer Theatre was renamed to honour Packer's commitment to the arts in Australia. The theatre was renamed in March 2015. Packer's children, Gretel and James, were present at the high tea reception for the renaming. It is currently owned by the New South Wales State Government and is leased, operated and managed by the Sydney Theatre Company. The theatre was ostensibly renovated in 2004 to host the Sydney Theatre Company's main stage productions, along with Sydney Dance Company's productions. The Packer Family, along with the Crown Resorts Foundation, gifted A$15 million to the Sydney Theatre Company in order to redevelop The Wharf on Sydney Harbour. Packer said that she was "profoundly honoured and touched" by the renaming of the theatre. The announcement of the renaming came a week before Packer's 76th birthday. Artistic Director of the Sydney Theatre Company, Andrew Upton, said "Ros has been a great friend to STC and the arts community for a very long time." The theatre is often colloquially referred to as "The Ros".

=== St Vincent's Private Hospital ===
Packer has had a long relationship with St Vincent's Private Hospital in the suburb of Darlinghurst, Sydney. Packer's relationship with the hospital spans back to Kerry Packer's various and frequent visits to the hospital. Kerry first visited St Vincent's Private Hospital in 1983 after complaining of severe chest pain and collapsing on The Australian Golf Club course. Bob Wright, Director of the Intensive Care Unit at St Vincent's, initially did not know who Kerry Packer was. However, Wright would later become Kerry Packer's personal physician. The Packer family's first donation to the hospital came in the form of new heart monitoring equipment from the company Hewlett Packard. Kerry's second major visit came after he suffered a heart-attack in 1990 whilst playing polo at his Ellerston estate.

=== Sydney Festival ===
Packer was on the Board of Directors of Sydney Festival from 1997 until 2009. Packer is also listed as a ‘Major Donor’ on the Sydney Festival website.

=== National Gallery of Australia ===
Packer was on the Council of the National Gallery of Australia from 2002 until 2011, as of 2021 she remains on the Gallery's Foundation Board.

=== Murdoch Children's Research Institute ===
As of May 2021, Packer currently sits on the Council of Ambassadors of the Murdoch Children's Research Institute. Packer said about the Institute: "It’s impossible not to be inspired when you see truly brilliant researchers using their talent to cure childhood disease and illness."

=== Victor Chang Cardiac Research Institute ===
Packer was on the board of the Victor Chang Cardiac Research Institute for 11 years.

== Residence ==
Packer enjoys residence at three different properties: the Cairnton holding in Bellevue Hill, a Palm Beach property in Sydney and the Ellerston estate near Scone.

=== Cairnton, Bellevue Hill ===
The Cairnton estate was initially purchased by Sir Frank Packer in the year 1935 for a purchase price of £7500. Since then, the estate has been continually expanded. Sir Frank Packer continued growing the estate throughout the 1960s, purchasing five more pieces of land. Packer's late husband, Kerry, bought a further four houses on Kambala Road during the late 1980s and early 1990s costing A$8.4 million. The estate is now 1.2 hectares.

=== Palm Beach ===
The Palm Beach property was transferred into Packer's daughter's name, Gretel Packer, as part of the settlement of Kerry Packer's estate. The property was valued at A$24 million in 2015.

=== Ellerston, Scone ===
The Ellerston estate is a 30,000 hectare property in the Hunter Valley region near Scone. It houses a polo facility, an 18-hole golf course designed by Greg Norman, a go-kart track as well as agricultural holdings of the Packer family. Kerry Packer purchased the 30,000 hectare property in 1972 and was later buried within the grounds of Ellerston in 2005. Ellerston is currently managed by Cameron Batho. Ellerston is 500m above sea level with a yearly 28-inch rainfall. Roughly 4000 cows are bred on the property during a regular season. In October 2020, a 25-year-old man was transported from Ellerston to John Hunter Hospital after suffering a head injury during a polo game. The man was transported using a Westpac Rescue Helicopter. A 48-year-old man, Guy Kirkpatrick, suffered head injuries on the farm whilst operating machinery and died on 7 January 2021. In 2015 a 50% share of Ellerston, comprising 1400ha, was sold by the Packer family's private company, Consolidated Press Holdings, to Crown Resorts for A$60 million. James Packer sold 40 ponies in 2009 for approximately A$5 million. A portion of the ponies were purchased by the Pieres family. In 2015, a further 140 ponies were sold for A$1.7 million. The Ellerston polo team won the Vivari Queen's Cup in 2008. A nine-metre bronze Greek horse head reportedly sits near Kerry Packer's grave in Ellerston. The statue was sculpted by British artist Nic Fiddian-Green and shipped to Australia.

== Political donations ==
Packer has donated significant sums of money to the federal Liberal Party. From 2012 to 2013, Roslyn Packer donated the largest amount of money received by any Australian political party. This figure amounted to $580,000 Australian Dollars which, according to the Australian Electoral Commission, was over triple the amount donated by the second biggest donor. Packer donated a further A$500,000 to the federal Liberal Party from 2016 to 2017. Johnson argues that Crown Casino benefits greatly from major concessions granted by the Victorian and Western Australian state governments.

== Personal life ==
According to Paul Barry’s various accounts of Packer, she is known to enjoy gardening and is a "home-loving, devoted mother" who is also "quiet, down to earth."

Former Australian cricketer Ian Chappell said about Packer:

"I'd class her as a very gentle person. Now maybe anybody’s going to be gentle when you compare them with Kerry, but that would be unfair because I think Ros is a very gentle person. She used to send fruit boxes into the dressing room during World Series Cricket. Maybe she was trying to wean us off the beer and get us onto some healthy food but I always thought it was a very nice gesture."

— Ian Chappell, Packer's Road, ABC

Al Dunlap, James Packer’s former mentor, said about Packer: "I liked Ros. She was in my view a highly intelligent woman. I think Ros could handle Kerry very well - 'cause it wasn't easy. She was a very capable woman."

In 2018, Packer flew to the United States to visit her son James Packer as he admitted himself to a A$5000-a-night psychiatric hospital.

In 2019, Packer attended the Chiva-Som luxury wellness spa in Thailand. The spa has hosted celebrity guests including Kate Moss and Madonna and costs between A$2000 and A$6000 a night.

Packer's 80th birthday was held at Chiswick restaurant in Woollahra, Sydney. 200 people attended the birthday, including her daughter Gretel Packer and granddaughter Francesca Packer, grandsons Benjamin and William, and her former daughter-in-law Erica Packer. As of 2021, Chiswick restaurant is owned by celebrity chef Matt Moran.
