= Albert J. Dunlap =

American corporate executive (1937–2019)

- Born: Albert John Dunlap; July 26, 1937; Hoboken, New Jersey, U.S.
- Died: January 25, 2019 (aged 81); Ocala, Florida, U.S.
- Other name: Chainsaw Al (Nickname)
- Education: United States Military Academy (BS)
- Occupation: Corporate executive
- Military career
- Allegiance: United States
- Branch: United States Army
- Service years: 1960–1963
- Rank: First lieutenant
- Unit: Air Defense Command

Albert John Dunlap (July 26, 1937 – January 25, 2019) was an American corporate executive. He was known at the peak of his career as a professional turnaround management specialist and downsizer. The mass layoffs at his companies earned him the nicknames "Chainsaw Al" and "Rambo in Pinstripes", after he posed for a photo wearing an ammo belt across his chest. It was later discovered that his reputed turnarounds were elaborate frauds and his career was ended after he engineered a massive accounting scandal at Sunbeam Products, now a division of Newell Brands, that forced the company into bankruptcy. Dunlap is on the lists of "Worst CEOs of All Time" published by several business publications. Fast Company noted that Dunlap "might score impressively on the Corporate Psychopathy checklist" and in an interview, Dunlap freely admitted to possessing many of the traits of a psychopath, but considered them positive traits such as leadership and decisiveness. He was a major benefactor of Florida State University.

== Early life and education ==
Dunlap was born in Hoboken, New Jersey in 1937. He entered West Point in 1956 and graduated with a degree in engineering in 1960. He then served in the United States Army for three years, qualifying as a paratrooper and being posted at a nuclear missile site.

== Early career ==
In 1963, Dunlap entered the business world at Kimberly-Clark as part of its manufacturing operations. He worked there for four years before being taken on at Sterling Pulp & Paper, where he was put in charge of the family-run business.

He engineered a massive accounting fraud at Nitec, a paper-mill company in Niagara Falls, New York. He was the company's president from 1974 to 1976, when he was fired owing to his abrasive management style. An audit by Arthur Young (now part of Ernst & Young) revealed numerous irregularities, including inflated inventory and non-existent sales — a situation similar to his later activities at Sunbeam. The final result was that Nitec's $5 million profit for 1976 was actually a $5.5 million loss. Nitec sued Dunlap for fraud but was ultimately forced out of business. Dunlap never mentioned Nitec on his resume, and the scandal was not widely known until reported by The New York Times after the revelation of his dishonesty at Sunbeam. Dunlap maintained his innocence even after a Nitec vice president testified under oath that Dunlap had personally ordered him to report the misleading figures.

Lily Tulip Cup hired him as the president and CEO in 1983. In 1985, he was given the additional title of chairman of the company.

From 1991 to 1993, he was CEO of the Australian firm Consolidated Press Holdings (CPH), a private company belonging to the Packer family, after Kerry Packer took a leave of absence for health reasons. At the time, CPH had a diverse portfolio in media and publishing, as well as chemical and agricultural operations. During his three years at the company, Dunlap mentored James Packer.

In 1994, Dunlap became the CEO of Scott Paper after Philip E. Lippincott stepped down from the position. In 1995, he sold Scott Paper to Kimberly-Clark for $9 billion, making $100 million from the deal via stock options and the appreciation of his holdings.

== Sunbeam ==
Dunlap took over as chairman and CEO of Sunbeam in 1996. His methods resulted in Sunbeam's reporting record earnings of $189 million in 1997.

However, he was unable to find a buyer by the end of the year. On March 3, 1998, Sunbeam announced the acquisitions of camping gear maker Coleman Company, coffee machine maker Signature Brands (best known for making Mr. Coffee), and smoke detector maker First Alert. Sunbeam's stock rose 9% on the news; within two days, it jumped to an all-time high of $52 per share.

Industry insiders became suspicious when they discovered certain seasonal items were being sold at higher volume than normal for the time of year. For instance, large numbers of barbecue grills were being sold during the fourth quarter. It turned out that Dunlap had been selling products to retailers at large discounts. The products were stored in third-party warehouses to be delivered later. That strategy, known as "bill and hold", is an accepted accounting practice, as long as the sales are booked after delivery. However, Dunlap booked the sales immediately. Many shareholders felt they had been tricked into buying stock that was worth far less than it actually was, and they filed a class action lawsuit against Dunlap and Sunbeam. When an analyst questioned Dunlap about the matter in May 1998, Dunlap reportedly grabbed him by the shoulder and said, "You son of a bitch. If you want to come after me, I'll come after you twice as hard."

In the second quarter of 1998, the Sunbeam board of directors investigated aggressive accounting practices and extreme discounting, carried out at the direction of Dunlap. It turned out that Dunlap had sold retailers far more merchandise than they could handle. With the stores hopelessly overstocked, unsold inventory piled up in Sunbeam's warehouses. As a result, Sunbeam faced losses of as much as $60 million in the second quarter of 1998. Dunlap's search for a buyer for Sunbeam in 1997 was timed so that the huge inventory-related losses would come to light after the sale had closed. The company's comptroller also told the board that Dunlap had told him to push the limits of accounting principles. On June 13, 1998, Dunlap was fired. According to Charles Elson, one of several directors appointed by Dunlap, the board was angered when Dunlap tried to explain the lackluster financials by claiming 1998 was a "transition year." Elson moved to terminate Dunlap, a motion that carried unanimously. According to a Sunbeam executive close to the board, the directors felt that Dunlap had deceived them about Sunbeam's numbers and intended to withhold his $35 million golden parachute. As the fraud was further uncovered in late 1998, Sunbeam was forced a number of times to restate financial results dating back to 1996.

In 2001, the U.S. Securities and Exchange Commission sued Dunlap, alleging that he had engineered a massive accounting fraud. Also named in the suit were four other former Sunbeam executives and Phillip E. Harlow, the lead partner for Sunbeam's account with Arthur Andersen. An SEC investigation revealed that Dunlap and others had created the impression of a greater loss in 1996 in order to make it look like the company had experienced a dramatic turnaround in 1997. By the SEC's estimate, at least $60 million of Sunbeam's 1997 earnings were fraudulent. He also offered incentives for retailers to sell products that would have otherwise been sold later in the year, a practice known as "channel stuffing", and used illegal bill and hold practices. The SEC also argued that the purchases of Coleman, Signature, and First Alert were made to conceal Sunbeam's growing problems. Sunbeam never recovered from the scandal and was forced into bankruptcy in 2002. The shareholder lawsuit against Dunlap dragged on until 2002, when he agreed to pay $15 million to settle the allegations.

Dunlap was also suspected of irregularities at Scott Paper. Not long after the shareholder settlement, he reached a settlement with the SEC. Although he did not admit or deny wrongdoing, he agreed to pay a $500,000 fine and accepted a lifetime ban from serving as an officer or director of a public company. The United States Department of Justice investigated Sunbeam's management during Dunlap's tenure but ultimately did not file any charges.

== Death ==
Dunlap died at his home in Ocala, Florida, on January 25, 2019, following a short illness. His death was announced by Florida State University.

He is survived by his wife Judy Dunlap and son Troy Dunlap.

== In popular culture ==
A documentary film was made about Dunlap in 1998 called Cutting to the Core—Albert J. Dunlap.

A 1999 BBC documentary film called The Mayfair Set, about business titans in Britain, prominently featured Dunlap.

In 2001, he was caricatured in Titans of Finance (Alternative Comics, 2001, ISBN 1-891867-05-9) by Rob Walker and Josh Neufeld. The comic book is a collaboration between a cartoonist and a finance columnist, which casts Wall Street executives and traders as heroes and villains. The lead story features Ronald O. Perelman, and Mike Vranos and Victor Niederhoffer are among those included.

He was interviewed by Jon Ronson for his 2011 book The Psychopath Test. Ronson gave Dunlap the Hare psychopathy test and noted that Dunlap possessed a number of traits common to psychopaths.

In 2002, a documentary film by the U.S. television program Frontline was released named Bigger than Enron. It detailed the events that occurred at Sunbeam when Dunlap was CEO and investigated the accounting practices that were implemented.
