= Power Games: The Packer–Murdoch War =

- DVD cover
- Genre: drama, miniseries
- Written by: David Caesar; Sam Winston
- Directed by: Geoff Bennett; David Caesar
- Starring: Lachy Hulme; Patrick Brammall; Luke Ford; Alexander England; Stephen Leeder; Maeve Dermody; Anne Looby; Heather Mitchell; Hamish Michael
- Theme music composer: Stephen Rae
- Country of origin: Australia
- Original language: English
- No. of episodes: 2

Production
- Cinematography: Bruce Young
- Editors: Julie-Anne De Ruvo; Mark Perry
- Running time: 180 minutes
- Production company: Southern Star Group

Original release
- Network: Nine Network
- Release: 8 September – 15 September 2013

Related
- Howzat! Kerry Packer's War

Power Games: The Packer–Murdoch War is an Australian drama-miniseries which screened on the Nine Network in 2013. The miniseries is set in the period 1960–75, when the Murdoch and Packer families collided as they battled for control of Australia's newspaper and television industries.

== Plot ==
Episode 1: The rivalry between the families dates back to a brawl in 1960, when Sir Frank Packer was trying to take over the Anglican Press, which owned a printing press that would help him take on the Murdoch-acquired Cumberland Press. When publisher Francis James refused to sell, Kerry Packer and some burly friends were sent down to help him change his mind. According to legend, they broke in and forcefully evicted the people still inside, cut the phone lines, changed the locks and barricaded the windows. Francis called upon Rupert Murdoch and boxer turned editor Frank Browne for help. Despite Packer having been an amateur boxer himself, he emerged with black eyes and a badly swollen face. The brawl made headlines in the Murdoch papers.

For the next year Murdoch competed with Packer and Fairfax in the suburban newspaper market, until they decided to carve out the territory between them, setting the scene for a lifelong rivalry between Kerry Packer and Rupert Murdoch.

Episode 2: Rupert starts "The Australian" newspaper and provides gentle editorial guidance.

There is a journalist strike with the shared newspapers, however when Frank refuses to negotiate with the union, Rupert realises that Frank is trying to bankrupt him. Rupert lies to Frank and tells him he is financially sound, so Frank ends the strike.

Rupert 'risks all' to buy "News of the World" in London. Later he does a similar deal to buy "The Sun". He makes it more competitive by taking the best ideas from other papers, and adding attractive girls to page 3. Later Rupert's wife is shocked to learn that the paper is displaying naked women. Rupert tells her he is not interested in what the 'establishment' think. Rupert's wife reminds him that he is 'the establishment'!

Rupert lends his Rolls-Royce to an editor in London while he is in Australia. The editor's wife is taken hostage after being mistaken for Rupert's wife. Frank gives Rupert advice, but the woman is killed. Rupert hires bodyguards for his family.

Rupert sacks his editor at "The Australian" for not following his instructions. Both Rupert and Frank appear to influence public opinion over their choice of prime ministers, yet Rupert has more success.

Frank struggles to relinquish control of his empire to his sons. Kerry, the younger son demonstrates more interest and a better business mind than his older brother Clyde. Although the newspapers are losing money, Frank does not want to sell them to Rupert. However Kerry's main interest is with magazines and television, so when his father falls ill, he sells the newspapers to Rupert. Kerry tells Rupert that he has won the battle. Of course history shows that Kerry doesn't do too badly himself.

== Ratings ==
| Episode | | Date | Timeslot | Viewers | Rank | Ref |
|---|---|---|---|---|---|---|
| 1 | "Part 1" | 8 September 2013 | Sunday 8:30 pm | 793,000 | #8 | |
| 2 | "Part 2" | 15 September 2013 | Sunday 8:30 pm | 773,000 | #9 | |

== Cast ==
- Lachy Hulme as Sir Frank Packer
- Patrick Brammall as Rupert Murdoch
- Luke Ford as Kerry Packer
- Alexander England as Clyde Packer
- Stephen Leeder as John 'Black Jack' McEwen
- Maeve Dermody as Anna Torv/Murdoch
- Anne Looby as Florence Packer
- Heather Mitchell as Gretel Packer
- Hamish Michael as Bruce Gyngell
- Alan Dukes as Frank Browne
- Hailey McQueen as Sonia McMahon
- Olivia McNamara as Prudence Murdoch
- Nicholas Bell as Rupert Henderson
- Charlton Hill as Bill Jenkings
- Lewis Fitz-Gerald as Alan Reid
- John Gregg as Calvin Tompkins

Bridget Griffen-Foley was historical consultant

== Accolades ==
| Year | Award | Category | Nominee | Result | Ref |
|---|---|---|---|---|---|
| 2014 | AACTA Awards | Best Telefeature, Mini Series or Short Run Series | | Nominated | |
| 2014 | AACTA Awards | Best Direction | Geoff Bennett for "Part One" | Won | |
| 2014 | AACTA Awards | Best Screenplay | Samantha Winston for "Part One" | Nominated | |
| 2014 | AACTA Awards | Best Lead Actor | Lachy Hulme | Won | |
| 2014 | AACTA Awards | Best Guest or Supporting Actor | Luke Ford for "Part 2" | Won | |
| 2014 | AACTA Awards | Best Guest or Supporting Actor | Alexander England for "Part 1" | Nominated | |
| 2014 | AACTA Awards | Best Guest or Supporting Actress | Heather Mitchell for "Part 1" | Nominated | |
| 2014 | AACTA Awards | Best Editing | Mark Perry for "Part 1" | Nominated | |

== See also ==
- Howzat! Kerry Packer's War
