= Kerry Packer Foundation =

The Kerry Packer Foundation was announced by James Packer at the MCG on 26 December 2006, with an A$10 million endowment for the support of disadvantaged cricketers in Australia. The announcement came on the first anniversary of the death of billionaire tycoon and cricket lover Kerry Packer.
