= Bridget Griffen-Foley =

Australian media historian (born 1970)

Bridget Griffen-Foley FAHA (born 27 June 1970) is a professor in the Department of Media, Communications, Creative Arts, Language and Literature, Macquarie University, New South Wales. She is author, co-author or editor of a large number of reference works and published articles on a wide range of topics relating to the histories of Australian newspapers, radio, and television outlets.

== Career ==
Griffen-Foley gained her BA in Modern History and English from Macquarie University in 1991, with Honours in 1992. She gained her PhD in Modern History at Macquarie in 1996, followed by a post-doctoral fellowship at the University of Sydney. She was appointed professor of Media Studies at Macquarie in 2013 and founder of the Centre for Media History in 2007, serving as its director 2007–2016.

== Publications ==
=== Books ===
- Griffen-Foley, B. (1999) The House of Packer: The Making of a Media Empire, Allen & Unwin
- Griffen-Foley, B. (2000, 2014) Sir Frank Packer: a Biography, HarperCollins
- Griffen-Foley, B. (2003) Party Games: Australian Politicians and the Media from War to Dismissal, Text Publishing
- Griffen-Foley, B. (2009) Changing Stations: The Story of Australian Commercial Radio, UNSW Press
- Griffen-Foley, B. (ed.) (2014) A Companion to the Australian Media, Australian Scholarly Publishing
- Griffen-Foley, B. (2020) Australian Radio Listeners and Television Viewers: Historical Perspectives

=== Articles ===
- Let's Join in: Children and ABC Radio in Historical Journal of Film, Radio and Television
- Keeping company: encountering the Fairfax Media archive in Inside Story, 27 August 2018

== Other activities ==
Griffen-Foley was

- historical consultant for the 2013 mini-series Power Games: The Packer–Murdoch Story
- board member of the State Library of New South Wales (2003–2012)
- member of the selection board for the Australian Media Hall of Fame (2015–2019)

Griffen-Foley has been involved with the Australian Dictionary of Biography (ADB) since 2000, firstly with its NSW Working Party, and more recently joining the Editorial Board in 2017. As of February 2023, she had written 16 biographies for the ADB. Mainly of journalists and media proprietors, subjects include Sir Frank Packer and Sir Warwick Fairfax.

== Awards and recognition ==
- Awarded the Medal for Modern History by Macquarie University in 1992 while studying for her PhD
- Shortlisted, Blake Dawson Prize for Business Literature, 2010 for Changing Stations : The Story of Australian Commercial Radio
- Elected Fellow of the Australian Academy of the Humanities in 2011

== Family ==
Bridget is the twin sister of Luke Aquinas Foley (born 27 June 1970).
