= Packer family =

Australian business family

Packer
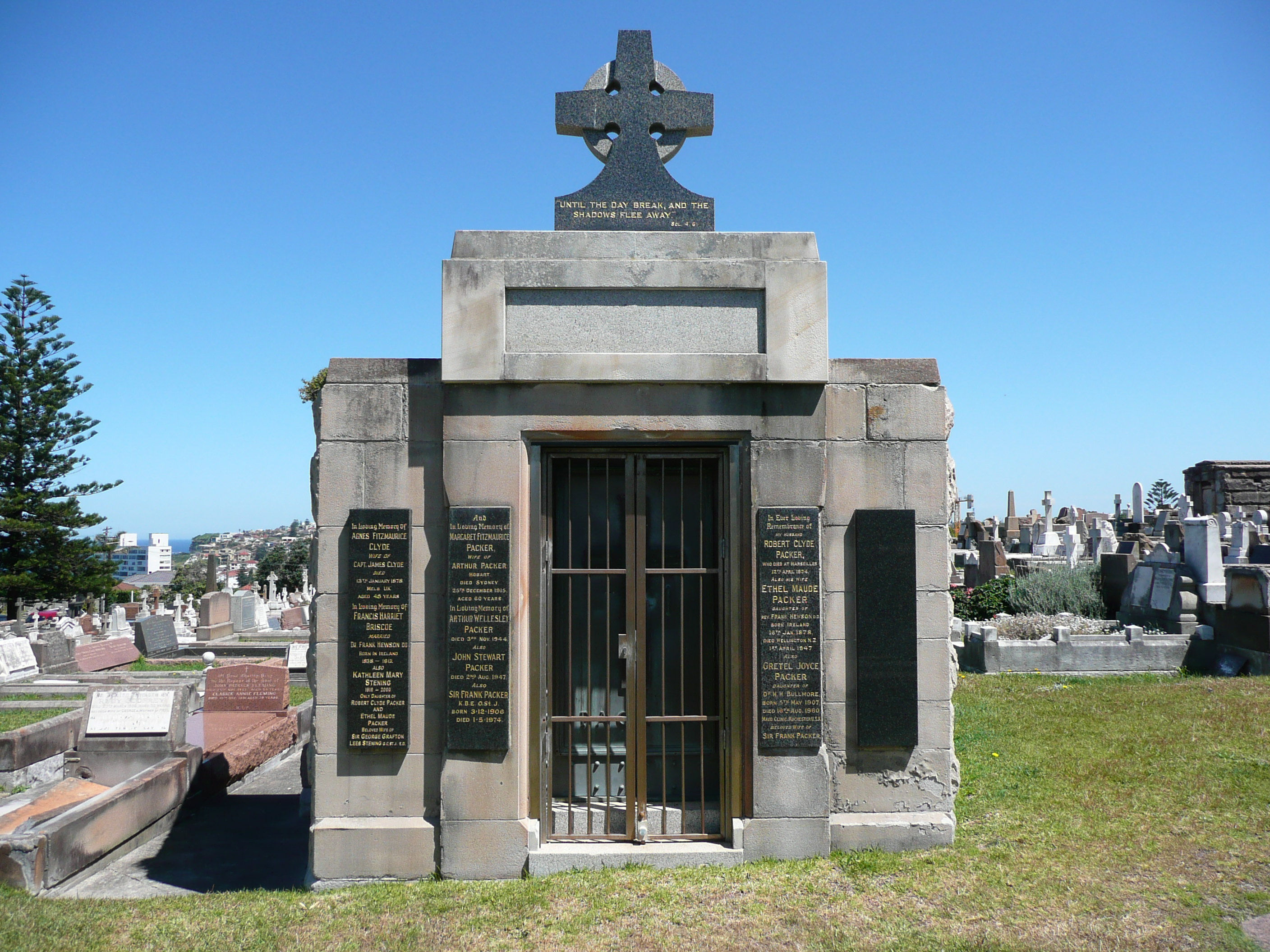
- Packer family mausoleum, South Head Cemetery
- Current region: Australia
- Founder: Robert Clyde Packer
- Members: Robert Clyde Packer; Sir Frank Packer; Clyde Packer; Kerry Packer; Roslyn Packer; Gretel Packer; James Packer

The Packer family has played a significant role in the Australian media, political and social sphere since the beginning of the twentieth century.

The family has had numerous interests in Australian business, most notably in media, property and recently in gambling.

== Family tree ==
- Robert Clyde Packer (24 July 1879 – 12 April 1934) m. Ethel Maude née Hewson (16 January 1878 − 1 April 1947)
  - Sir (Douglas) Frank Hewson Packer KBE, OStJ (3 December 1906 – 1 May 1974) m. (1) Gretel Joyce Bullmore (5 May 1907 − 16 August 1960); (2) Florence Mathilde Adeline Violet (Vincent), née Porges (June 1915 − 22 December 2012)
    - Kerry Francis Bullmore Packer AC (17 December 1937 – 26 December 2005) m. Roslyn Redman née Weedon AC in 1963
      - Gretel Packer (c. 1965 – ) m. (1) Nick Barham (m. ?? – 1999); (2) Shane Murray (m. ?? – 2007)
        - Francesca Barham (c. 1995 –)
        - Ben Barham (c. 1998 –)
        - William Kerry Murray (c. 2006 –)
      - James Douglas Packer (8 September 1967 –) m. (1) Jodhi Meares (m. 1999 – 2002); (2) Erica née Baxter (m. 2007 – 2013)
        - Indigo Packer (Baxter) (27 July 2008 –)
        - Jackson Lloyd Packer (Baxter) (1 February 2010 –)
        - Emmanuelle Sheelah Packer (Baxter) (22 September 2012 –)
    - (Robert) Clyde Packer (22 July 1935 – 8 April 2001) m. (1) Angela née Money in 1961, divorced in 1972; (2) Kate Clifford in 1977.
      - Francis Clyde Packer
  - Kathleen Mary Packer (1910 – 2000), known later as Lady Stening, m. Sir George Stening (1904 – 1996)

== Notable members ==
Name	Birth name	Years living	Business interests	Spouse
R. C. Packer	Robert Clyde Packer	24 July 1879 – 12 April 1934	Smith's Weekly; The Daily Telegraph	Ethel Maude Hewson (16 January 1878 − 1 April 1947)
Sir Frank Packer KBE, OStJ	Douglas Frank Hewson Packer	3 December 1906 – 1 May 1974	TCN; ACP Magazines	1. Gretel Joyce Bullmore (5 May 1907 − 16 August 1960); 2. Florence Mathilde Adeline Violet (Vincent), née Porges (June 1915 − 22 December 2012)
Clyde Packer	Robert Clyde Packer	22 July 1935 – 8 April 2001	ACP Magazines; Spin Records; New South Wales Legislative Council	1. Angela Money (m. 1961–1972); 2. Kate Clifford (m. 1977–2001)
Kerry Packer AC	Kerry Francis Bullmore Packer	17 December 1937 – 26 December 2005	ACP Magazines; Publishing and Broadcasting Limited; Consolidated Media Holdings; World Series Cricket	Roslyn Weedon (m. 1963–2005)
Ros Packer AC	Roslyn Redman Weedon			Kerry Packer
James Packer	James Douglas Packer	8 September 1967 –	One.Tel; Crown Resorts; Consolidated Media Holdings; RatPac Entertainment; South Sydney Rabbitohs	1. Jodhi Meares (m. 1999–2002); 2. Erica Packer (m. 2007–2013)
