= Fyning Hill =

Estate near Rogate in West Sussex, England

Coordinates: 51.01927°N 0.84270°W

Fyning Hill is a large estate near the village of Rogate in West Sussex. It has been owned by several prominent people including Kerry Packer and Roman Abramovich.

== History ==
The main house contains 8 bedrooms with 5 reception rooms. It was owned by Sir Albert Braithwaite until his death in 1959. The estate was owned in the 1970s and 1980s by the Jordanian businessman Taj Hajjar, who was a friend of King Hussein of Jordan.

The biggest ever robbery in Sussex occurred on the property in May 1983 when £800,000 of jewellery was stolen. Hajjar put up an £80,000 reward, but no thief was ever apprehended.

Hajjar sold the estate to the Australian publisher and broadcaster Kerry Packer for $5 million in May 1989. Packer built the headquarters for his polo team at Fyning Hill, and would arrive at the estate in May for the three-month English polo season. Packer subsequently bought the nearby Great House Farm for £580,000 in June 1989, and had acquired 600 acres of nearby countryside by June 1990. Packer's daughter, Gretel, was married on the estate in 1991.

The estate totalled 424 acres with five houses and nine cottages by September 1999 when Packer put the estate up for sale. The estate was bought by the Russian businessman Roman Abramovich in 1999 for £12 million.

Fyning Hill was included as part of the divorce settlement between Abramovich and his second wife, Irina Malandina, in 2007. The estate was valued at £18 million at the time.

The size of the estate was listed as 420 acres in 2017.
