= Newcastle Waters Station =

Pastoral lease in Northern Territory

Coordinates: 17°22′40″S 133°24′35″E

Location in Northern Territory

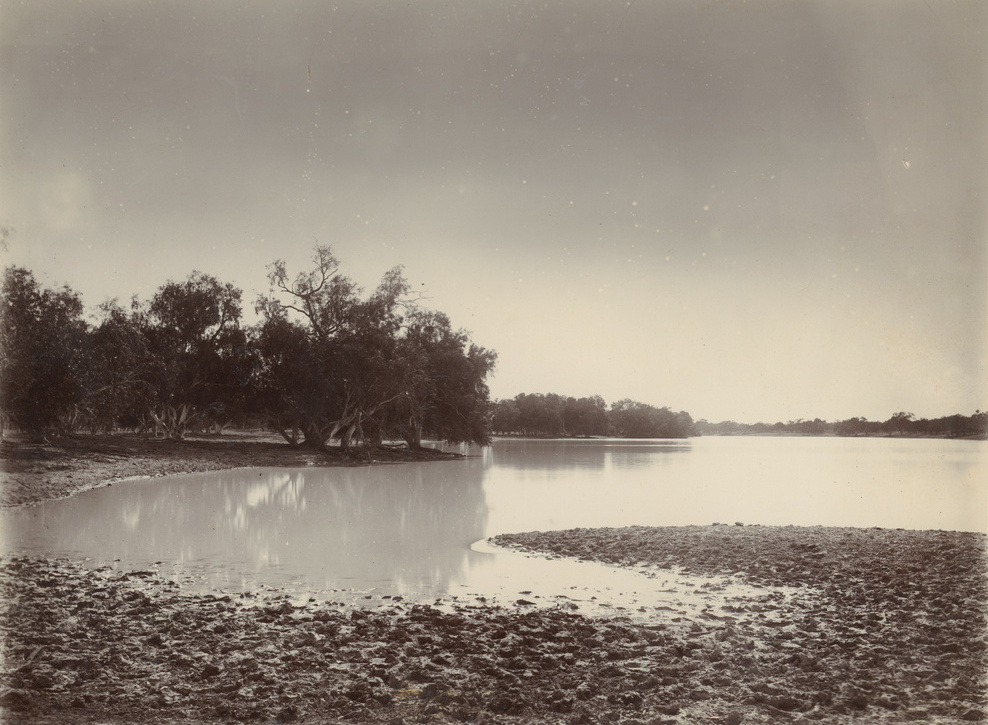
Newcastle Waters c. 1900

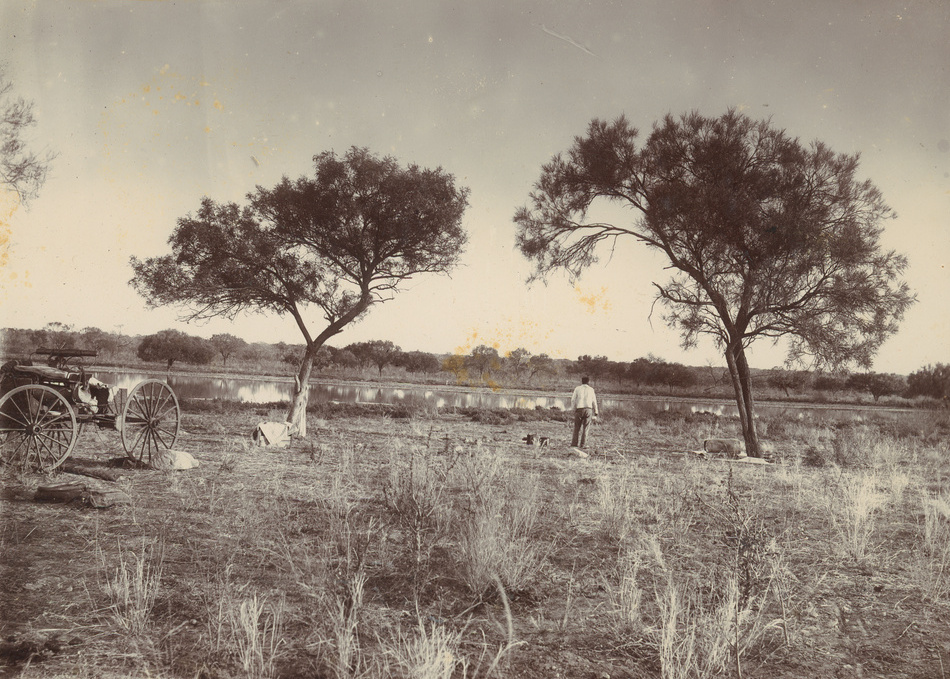
Newcastle Waters Camping Ground c. 1900

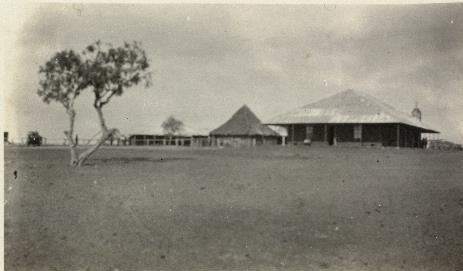
Newcastle Waters Station homestead 1930

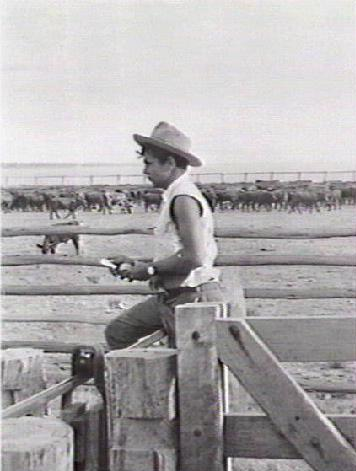
Stockman with Newcastle Waters steers at No.7 dip

Newcastle Waters Station is a pastoral lease between Alice Springs and Darwin, supporting about 45,000 cattle in a notably well-watered area of 10,353 square kilometres. Kerry Packer was once a partner in the station, and sent his son James to work there for a year.

== Description ==
It is located about 777 kilometres (483 mi) north of Alice Springs and 705 kilometres (438 mi) south of Darwin in the Northern Territory. The nearest settlement is Elliot which is approximately 24 kilometres (15 mi) south east of the station. Occupying an area of 10,353 square kilometres (3,997 sq mi) of open plains, floodplain and wooded sandhills the property carries about 45,000 head of cattle including about 20,000 brahman breeders, and annually turn off about 13,000 for export to Indonesia.

== History ==
John McDouall Stuart, the explorer, reached the area in 1861 established a base camp near the present site of the station. He described the river running north from Lake Woods as the most splendid reach of water and named it "Glandfield lagoon" after Edward Glandfield the mayor of Adelaide and later changed by the expeditions sponsor to "Newcastle Waters" after the Duke of Newcastle, Secretary for the Colonies.

Established in the early 1880s by Dr. W.J. Browne of Adelaide who had also established Springvale Station near Katherine. Alfred Giles managed Brownes properties and had renowned stockman D'Arcy Uhr overland a mob of cattle from western Queensland in 1883. Browne's business interests failed and he was forced to sell the lease to John Lewis, also from Adelaide, in 1895. The Lewis family held onto the lease for the next 50 years.

Sheep were once grazing at the station with the first flock of being moved off in 1897.

The station was turning off large numbers of cattle since the early 1900s, 1,100 were turned off via Hergott Springs in 1905 and another 1,260 being droved to Oodnadatta in 1910. Large number of cattle have been produced of the property since.

In 1921 the station was mostly quarantined to control an infection of pleuropneumonia., during this time no stock was allowed in or out of the area. Another quarantine for an area of about 200 square miles (518 km^{2}) of the station was put into effect in 1927.

Following a dry season in 1928, heavy rains came at the start of the wet season in 1929, causing the creeks to flood and waters to rise almost to the front steps of the police station.

The government resumed an area of 1 square mile (3 km^{2}) from the station in 1930 to create a townsite. A works depot and a police station already existed in the area at the time. By the 1960s it was a virtual ghost town as road trains had replaced droving to transport cattle to market.

The station and surrounding area were devastated by a large scale bushfire in 1951. The fire burnt out over 1,000 square miles (2,590 km^{2}) over a 20 miles (32 km) front. Station workers had to backburn in an attempt to control the flames.

Ted Egan, the folk musician and former Administrator of the Northern Territory, was the sole teacher at Newcastle Waters in 1965 and was stranded at the property for six weeks when the creek flooded. During this time no supplies were able to be delivered so Egan had to hunt for animals, such as bush turkey for his dinner. He later returned to the station in 2012 for the book launch of, Middle of Everywhere, about life in the area.

Kerry Packer was a partner in the station along with Ken Warriner, Peter Baillieu and Tony Chisholm when the group purchased the property in 1983. Packer later attempted to purchase the prestigious Victoria River Downs in 1984 only to have the deal blocked by the state government. His son, James Packer worked on the property for a year as a jackaroo. He also was responsible for selling Newcastle Waters, along with 16 other properties that made up his family's pastoral portfolio, in 2009 to Terra Firma for A$425 million.

A bushfire burnt out a large area of pasture in 2012 when a car caught fire on the Stuart Highway, the fire to the east of the highway was extinguished but the area to the west was controlled by station workers to keep it away from stock. The fire eventually came to Lake Longreach within the station where it burnt out in the damp conditions.

The traditional owners of Newcastle Waters became the fourth Indigenous group in the Northern Territory to gain native title over both the old townsite and parts of the station covering a toal area of 30,000 square kilometres (11,583 sq mi). The Federal Court of Australia had a special ceremonial sitting on the property to commemorate the occasion. 10 other pastoral leases and the town of Daly Waters are within the area of determination.

== See also ==
- List of ranches and stations
- List of the largest stations in Australia
