= James Packer =

Australian businessman (born 1967)

- Born: James Douglas Packer; 8 September 1967 (age 59); Sydney, New South Wales, Australia
- Education: Cranbrook School
- Occupations: Former executive chairman of Publishing and Broadcasting Limited (PBL), Consolidated Media Holdings and Crown Resorts
- Known for: Packer family
- Spouses: Jodhi Meares (m. 1999; div. 2002) Erica Baxter (m. 2007; div. 2013)
- Children: 3
- Parents: Kerry Packer (father); Roslyn Packer (mother)
- Relatives: Sir Frank Packer (grandfather); Gretel Packer (sister); Clyde Packer (uncle); Robert Clyde Packer (great grandfather)

James Douglas Packer (born 8 September 1967) is an Australian billionaire businessman and investor. Packer is the son of Kerry Packer, a media mogul, and his wife, Roslyn Packer. He is the grandson of Frank Packer. He inherited control of the family company, Consolidated Press Holdings Limited, as well as investments in Crown Resorts and other companies. He is the former executive chairman of Publishing and Broadcasting Limited (PBL) and Consolidated Media Holdings, which predominantly owned media interests across a range of platforms, and a former executive chairman of Crown Resorts.

As of May 2023, Packer's net worth was assessed as A$4.95 billion by the Financial Review Rich List, ranking him as the eighteenth-wealthiest Australian; he was the richest person in Australia in 2006 and 2007. Forbes Asia magazine assessed Packer's net worth at US$3.6 billion in January 2019, the ninth-richest Australian. In June 2022, the Federal Court approved Blackstone's takeover of Crown Casinos, delivering Packer A$3.36 billion in exchange for his 37 percent stake in the company, which he has been involved with since 1999. Packer has an investment in ADH TV, although the total value is unknown.

== Early life and education ==
James Packer was born in Sydney, the son of philanthropist Roslyn (née Weedon) and media mogul Kerry Packer. His grandfather was the media proprietor Sir Frank Packer. Packer was educated at Cranbrook School in Bellevue Hill, Sydney. After obtaining the Higher School Certificate (HSC) at Cranbrook, he began working at his father's extensive Newcastle Waters cattle station in the Barkly Tableland of the Northern Territory, where he was a jackeroo. Packer has stated he did not attend university as he "didn't have the marks". His mentors, he has said, include his father and corporate executive Albert J. Dunlap.

== Career ==
=== Early internet investments ===
Following the dotcom crash of 2000–2001, Packer acquired stakes in the online classified sites Seek and Carsales.com, believing that newspaper companies relying heavily on classified advertising were vulnerable to online companies in categories including employment and vehicle listings.

Packer purchased a 25% stake in SEEK for A$33 million in August 2003. He sold most of his stake six years later for A$440 million. At Packer's urging, the magazine group then controlled by his family, Australian Consolidated Press, acquired a 41% stake in online advertiser Carsales in October 2005. The deal, initially valued at A$100 million, was eventually worth A$462 million to Packer-controlled entities.

=== Selling Channel Nine ===
In March 2006, Packer began discussing whether to sell Channel Nine and the Australian Consolidated Press magazine group to help fund his move into the international gaming and tourism business. Given changes in media due to the Internet and pay-TV, Packer was concerned about the future of free-to-air television. On 17 October 2006, Packer's team finalised a deal to sell 50% of the media assets—which also included a 50% stake in web portal Ninemsn and a 51% stake in Carsales—to private equity group CVC Asia Pacific for A$4.5 billion, plus an additional A$1 billion in equity in the new company, which would be called PBL Media.

In June 2007, Packer sold another 25% share of the joint-venture PBL Media to CVC for $515 million. In October 2008, Packer wrote down his final 25% stake in PBL Media to zero. By the end of 2012, debt from CVC's acquisition had overwhelmed Channel Nine and US hedge funds ousted CVC, taking complete ownership.

=== One.Tel ===
Packer was a director of Australian Telecommunications company One.Tel, which was declared insolvent during May 2001. The collapse of One.Tel cost PBL A$327 million. Packer admitted at a PBL annual general meeting that he had learned "painful lessons" from the collapse of One.Tel. Later at the liquidator's inquiry over the collapse he denied that he was apologising for his own conduct; instead, he claimed, "I was making an apology for accepting the bona fides of Mr. [Jodee] Rich and the executive directors of One.Tel."

In April 2014, Lachlan Murdoch and Packer agreed to a A$40 million settlement over the One.Tel failure. The settlement was approved by the Supreme Court of New South Wales on 17 April 2014, with A$14.93 million to be paid by the Packer family's Consolidated Press Holdings, A$11.77 million to be paid by Packer's Crown Resorts and A$13.3 million to be paid by News Corp.

=== Crown Resorts ===
Since his father's death, Packer has moved away from the family's traditional media businesses and focused on creating a worldwide gambling empire: Crown Resorts. It has businesses and investments in the integrated resort and casino sectors in Australia and Macau, and wholly owns and operates a high-end casino in London, Crown Aspinall's. In October 2017, Crown's market capitalization was over $8 billion. On 21 March 2018, Packer resigned as executive chairman of Crown Resorts. In May 2019, Packer sold half of his stake in Crown Resorts to Lawrence Ho.

In October 2020, Packer appeared before an independent inquiry into Crown's suitability to hold casino licence in NSW. When questioned over impropriety, illegality and corruption, Packer admitted that while a director of Crown he made "shameful" and "disgraceful" threats against businessman Ben Gray. In February 2021, the inquiry found that Crown was unsuitable to hold a casino licence due in part to Packer's threats to Ben Gray, as well as its "continued commercial relationships with junket operators who had links to triads and other organised crime groups.” In February 2022, The Blackstone Group acquired Crown Resorts for A$8.9 billion (US$6.4 billion). Packer held 37% of Crown Resorts stock at the time of the sale. He received A$3.36 billion for his shares.

=== Other business activities ===
Packer purchased an 18% stake in Network Ten in 2010, quickly offloading half to Lachlan Murdoch. Three months later, after a dispute with Murdoch over a senior management appointment, Packer resigned his Network Ten board seat. There was also speculation that he resigned due to a conflict of interest with his interests in Consolidated Media Holdings. Following the implementation of CBS's restructure of Network Ten announced in August 2017, Packer will no longer have an interest in Network Ten. In late May 2011, Packer made a reported A$80 million investment in daily deals sites Scoopon and Catch of the Day through a partnership between his Consolidated Press Holding and several other investors, including Andrew Bassat, a co-founder of Seek.com.au.

In December 2012, Packer and producer-filmmaker Brett Ratner formed a joint venture, RatPac Entertainment. The first film financed by RatPac was a major success. Gravity, a space thriller directed by Alfonso Cuaron and starring Sandra Bullock and George Clooney, generated the strongest-ever October opening in the US and took box office receipts of more than US$100 million in its first five days. Packer sold his investment in RatPac for an undisclosed amount in April 2017. According to Filmink "Who knows what sort of legacy James Packer is going to leave when he shuffles off this mortal coil, but I maintain the films he helped finance...will stand out among the more positive achievements."

In October 2014, Packer bought out Peter Holmes à Court's 37.5% share of the ownership of South Sydney Rabbitohs NRL club, becoming Russell Crowe's partner in the Blackcourt League Investments Pty Limited venture.

In 2021, Packer co-founded NPACT Capital and Investment Management with the former Crown Resorts executive Todd Nisbet and Packer's Consolidated Press Holdings. The property investment venture backed luxury residential developments in Sydney and Melbourne in joint venture with developers including Third.i Group, Time & Place, Orchard Piper, and Chapter Group.

In 2022, following the sale of his $3.3 billion stake in Crown Resorts, Packer sought to simplify his investment portfolio concentrating on big tech stocks, AI and property. As at 30 June 2024, Packer holds almost $500 million of Nvidia, $452 million of Meta and $366 million of Taiwan Semiconductor Manufacturing Company.

== Personal life ==
Packer owns residential property in Bondi Beach and in Bellevue Hill, in Sydney's eastern suburbs. The Packer family also have pastoral property holdings in Scone, called Ellerston Station, and, since 2018, is owned by his sister, Gretel. In March 2025, Packer purchased the “Le Belvedere” property in Bel Air, Los Angeles from real estate developer Mohamed Hadid for US$110 million.

Following the breakdown of his first marriage, and the development of a friendship with American actor Tom Cruise, Packer began attending the Church of Scientology in Australia, taking courses on the Church's Dundas business centre in 2002. He subsequently confirmed his involvement with Scientology, saying he had found it "helpful". He later distanced himself from the church. In 2020, during the public inquiry into Crown Casinos, Packer revealed he had bipolar disorder.

=== Relationships ===
Packer and actress Kate Fischer separated in 1998 after five years together and a two-year engagement. Packer married Jodhi Meares at his home in Bellevue Hill, Sydney in October 1999; the relationship lasted two years, and the couple separated in 2002. Packer later married part-time model and singer Erica Baxter, whom he wed in the equivalent of a civil ceremony on 20 June 2007. The wedding was at the Antibes town hall, and the second ceremony took place at Hotel du Cap – Eden Roc in Cap d'Antibes on the French Riviera. Together, Packer and Baxter have three children: a daughter, born 27 July 2008, a son, born 1 February 2010, and another daughter, born 22 September 2012. In September 2013 James and Erica Packer announced they were separating.

Packer and American singer-songwriter Mariah Carey became engaged in January 2016, but had broken up by October. At the time it was alleged that the break-up was a result of Carey's extravagant spending and rows over her reality show Mariah's World, but Packer later said that the relationship had just been a "mistake" for both sides. In November 2017, Packer paid Carey a multi-million dollar settlement, in response to a lawsuit pursued by Carey citing an "inconvenience fee". In 2019, Packer was dating Kylie Lim.

=== Philanthropy ===
Packer has supported a number of Australian medical institutions such as the Victor Chang Cardiac Research Centre and Peter MacCallum Cancer Centre, and mental wellbeing programs such as Lifeline.

Packer is the founder of both the Packer Family Foundation and Crown Resorts Foundation. In July 2014, the two foundations launched their A$200 million National Philanthropic Fund, one of Australia's largest philanthropic commitments. According to the two foundations, they are working together to promote Indigenous education opportunities, the arts and culture, and partnerships with organisations that encourage and foster social cohesion. Underlying these priorities are learning, accessibility and engagement outcomes for young Australians – staying engaged with school and learning is the key to long-term positive outcomes, and this is the approach and message that the partner organisations are delivering.

The Packer Family Foundation has provided $50 million to support Australia's arts and cultural institutions as well as arts education programs throughout lower socio economic communities. The arts education funding has supported schools throughout areas like Mt Druitt, Liverpool, Campbelltown, Penrith and Blacktown to provide arts, music and literacy programs which support educational outcomes, teachers, and school engagement.

Packer and the Packer Family Foundation continue to provide support for mental wellbeing programs. In March 2023, Packer and the Packer Family Foundation gave $6 million to Lifeline International to work towards decriminalizing suicide globally. In May 2023, Packer and the Packer Family Foundation jointly donated $7 million to the University of New South Wales for mental health research, with a focus on mood disorders.

=== Controversies ===
Packer was involved in a public physical brawl at Bondi Beach in 2014 with David Gyngell, a long-term friend and head of Channel Nine. Gyngell and Packer were both fined $500 for offensive behaviour over the incident. In late 2016, Israeli Police started looking into reports that Packer gave members of Prime Minister Benjamin Netanyahu's family gifts and benefits. Packer, who is trying to gain residency in Israel, has taken the first step and registered with Israeli tax authorities.

In February 2018, Packer was mentioned in an Israeli Police report recommending the prosecution of Netanyahu on corruption charges for accepting bribes, and acting against the interests of the state of Israel. Packer is mentioned in the report to have provided Netanyahu and his family members with champagne, cigars, jewellery and clothing valued at approximately US$100,000. In 2026, the Sydney Morning Herald reported that Packer has paid over US$1.25 million to the law firm defending Netanyahu in his corruption case. Packer claimed the payments are for "deal finding" and not for work on the Netanyahu case, but he declined to provide evidence of such work done by the firm. Netanyahu is legally barred from receiving donor assistance for his legal defense.

In March 2019, leaked text messages showed that Kevin Tsujihara had promised auditions and acting jobs to actress Charlotte Kirk in return for sex in September 2013. They also showed that the sex was facilitated by her then-friend Packer for his personal influence. In September 2020 her lawyers filed a petition in the Los Angeles Superior Court to vacate a gag order that has kept her mostly silent amid the years-long battle. The petition paints a picture of Tsujihara engaging in non-consensual sex.

=== Net worth ===
Packer first appeared on various wealth lists in 2006, following the death of his father the previous year and the intergeneration transfer of the bulk of Kerry Packer's wealth to his son, James. James Packer's wealth was valued at A$7.25 billion. The 2008 BRW Rich 200 listed Packer as the third-richest person in Australia with a personal wealth of A$6.1 billion, behind Fortescue Metals Group chief executive Andrew Forrest and Westfield Group's Frank Lowy. That was the first time in 21 years that a member of the Packer family had not topped the list. According to BRW, Packer's wealth dipped to an estimated A$3 billion during 2009. In its 2013 BRW Rich 200 list, Packer was ranked third with his wealth estimated at A$6.0 billion, a boost of A$1.1 billion on the previous year. In the 2014 wealth rankings by BRW, Packer's wealth was assessed at A$7.19 billion, making him the third-richest Australian. In 2015 BRW Rich 200, Packer's net worth was assessed at A$6.08 billion, making him the seventh-richest Australian. Published since 2017 as the Financial Review Rich List, the successor of the BRW Rich 200, as of May 2025 Packer's net worth was assessed at A$4.98 billion, making him the 30th wealthiest Australian.

In January 2009, The Sunday Telegraph reported that due to ongoing financial problems, Packer's wealth dropped to under A$3 billion; also reporting that Packer listed for sale his Mangusta yacht and delayed the purchase of a Boeing business jet. Yet by mid-2010, it was reported that Packer owned a number of assets including Ellerston Z (a superyacht), Arctic P (a luxury cruise ship and former ice-breaker), a private jet, a 12-seater Sikorsky S-76 helicopter, and a variety of cars. As of January 2019, Forbes magazine estimated Packer's wealth at US$3.6 billion, down from the US$6.60 billion published by Forbes in their 2014 list of the richest people in Australia. In the 2017 Forbes list of the 50 Richest Australians, Packer's net worth was assessed at US$3.9 billion, making him the ninth-richest Australian.

==== Wealth rankings ====
Year	Financial Review Rich List		Forbes Australia's 40 Richest	
Year	Rank	Net worth (A$)	Rank	Net worth (US$)
2006	1 ▲	$7.10 billion ▲	1 ▲	$5.20 billion ▲
2007	1 ▲	$7.25 billion ▲	1	$5.50 billion ▲
2008	3 ▼	$6.10 billion ▼	3 ▼	$5.30 billion ▼
2009	6 ▼	$3.00 billion ▼	1 ▲	$3.10 billion ▼
2010	6	$4.10 billion ▲	3 ▼	$3.50 billion ▲
2011	8 ▼	$4.16 billion ▲	3	$4.40 billion ▲
2012	6	$5.21 billion ▲	4 ▼	$4.50 billion ▲
2013	3 ▲	$6.00 billion ▲	3 ▲	$6.00 billion ▲
2014	3	$7.19 billion ▲	3	$6.60 billion ▲
2015	7 ▼	$6.08 billion ▼	4 ▼	$4.70 billion ▼
2016	7	$5.00 billion ▼	6 ▼	$3.50 billion ▼
2017	9 ▼	$4.79 billion ▼	9 ▼	$3.90 billion ▲
2018	10 ▼	$5.50 billion ▲		
2019	13 ▼	$4.94 billion ▼	9	$3.60 billion ▼
2020	13	$4.69 billion ▼		
2021	15 ▼	$5.72 billion ▲		
2022	17 ▼	$6.00 billion ▲		
2023	18 ▼	$4.95 billion ▼		
2024	20 ▼	$5.69 billion ▲		
2025	30 ▼	$4.98 billion ▼		

Legend
Icon	Description
Steady	Has not changed from the previous year
▲	Has increased from the previous year
▼	Has decreased from the previous year

== See also ==
- List of NRL club owners

== Bibliography ==
- Barry, Paul (2002). Rich Kids. Bantam Books. ISBN 1-86325-338-6.
- Barry, Paul (2009). Who Wants to Be a Billionaire?. Sydney: Allen & Unwin. ISBN 978-1-74175-974-7.
- Kitney, Damon (2018). The Price of Fortune" The Untold Story of Being James Packer. Sydney, NSW: HarperCollins. ISBN 9781460756690.
