= Gretel Packer =

Australian investor and philanthropist

Gretel Packer AM
- Born: August 1965 (age 61); Sydney, New South Wales, Australia
- Occupations: Chair, Crown Resorts Foundation; Chair, Packer Family Foundation
- Known for: Packer family
- Spouses: Nick Barham (div. 1999); Shane Murray (m. 2005; div. 2007)
- Children: 3
- Parents: Kerry Packer (father); Roslyn Packer (mother)
- Relatives: James Packer (brother); Sir Frank Packer (grandfather); Clyde Packer (uncle); Robert Clyde Packer (great grandfather)

Gretel Lees Packer AM (born August 1965) is an Australian investor and philanthropist.

== Early life and career ==
Packer is the daughter of Kerry Packer, a media mogul, and his wife, Roslyn Packer. She is the granddaughter of Sir Frank Packer. She is a former student of Ascham School.

Following the death of her father and an estimated A$1.2 billion settlement in 2015 with her brother, James, she inherited investments in Crown Resorts, and other companies.

Her philanthropic interests include a broad range of community activities and charities aligned to the arts, education, and environmental science. Packer is Vice-President of the Board of Trustees of the Art Gallery of New South Wales, Chair of the Advisory Board of Crown Resorts Foundation, Chair of the Packer Family Foundation, Chair of The Sydney Theatre Company Foundation, and a Founding Patron of the Taronga Zoo Conservation Science Initiative and a Founding Governor of the Taronga Zoo Foundation. She has previously served as a Director of the Royal Hospital for Women Foundation and as a Council Member of the Royal Botanic Gardens Foundation.

== Personal life ==
Packer had two children with her first husband, Nick Barham, who she divorced in 1999, and one child with her second husband, Shane Murray, whom she married in late 2005 and divorced in 2007.

=== Net worth ===
As of May 2025, Packer's net worth was assessed as A$2.33 billion by the Financial Review in the 2025 Rich List. Forbes Asia magazine assessed Packer's net worth at US$1.6 billion in January 2019.

Year	Financial Review Rich List		Forbes Australia's 50 Richest	
Year	Rank	Net worth (A$)	Rank	Net worth (US$)
2017				
2018	61 ▲	$1.26 billion ▲		
2019	80 ▼	$1.16 billion ▼	26 ▼	$1.60 billion
2020	56 ▲	$1.77 billion ▲		
2021	50 ▲	$2.30 billion ▲		
2022	56 ▲	$2.00 billion ▲		
2023	61 ▼	$2.09 billion ▲		
2024		$2.20 billion ▲		
2025	71	$2.33 billion ▲		

Legend
Icon	Description
Steady	Has not changed from the previous year
▲	Has increased from the previous year
▼	Has decreased from the previous year
