= Herbert Bullmore =

Scotland international rugby union player

- Born: Herbert Henry Bullmore; 12 July 1874 Ipswich, Queensland, Australia
- Died: 28 December 1937 (aged 63) Point Piper, Sydney, New South Wales, Australia
- School: Ipswich Grammar School
- University: University of Edinburgh
- Occupation: physician

Rugby union career
- Position: Forward
Amateur team(s)
Years	Team	Apps	(Points)
- Edinburgh University RFC
Provincial / State sides
Years	Team	Apps	(Points)
- Queensland
International career
Years	Team	Apps	(Points)
1902	Scotland	1	(0)

Herbert Henry Bullmore (12 July 1874 – 28 December 1937) was a rugby union player who represented Scotland, a leading physician and the grandfather of Australian media magnate Kerry Packer.

== Life history ==
Bullmore was born in Ipswich, Queensland in 1874, the only son, along with five daughters, of grazier and unsuccessful political candidate Edward Augustus Bullmore, Esq and Caroline Frederica Bullmore, and was educated at Ipswich Grammar School, Queensland. While in Australia, Bullmore made a name for himself as a sportsman, representing Queensland at rugby union. Bullmore spent three years studying law, before deciding to undertake medical studies at the University of Edinburgh in Scotland, graduating in 1902. During this time Bullmore continued to indulge his sporting nature, gaining a blue in football and rowing and starring as a sturdy second-rower for the university rugby union team. From 1901 to 1902 Bullmore was President of Edinburgh University Union. By dint of his medical degree at Edinburgh, Bullmore was available for selection to the Scotland rugby teams and was selected to represent Scotland as a forward in a match against Ireland in Belfast on 22 February 1902, with Scotland losing 5–0.

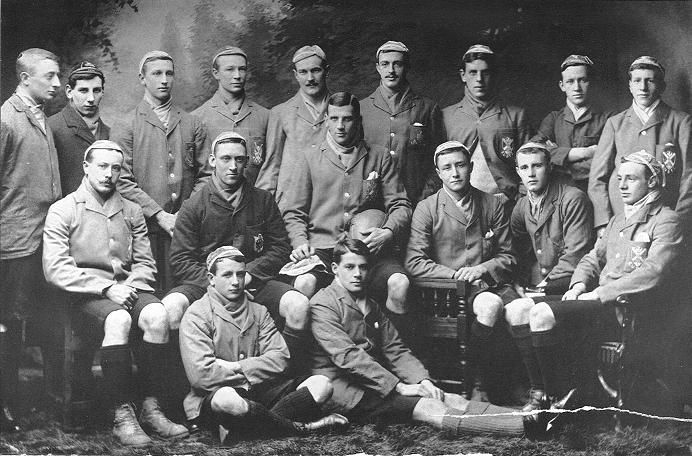
Bullmore with the Edinburgh University team of 1900/01. Bullmore is back row, fourth from left.

Bullmore served as a resident at the Royal Infirmary and at the Children's Hospital, Edinburgh, gaining his Membership of the Royal College of Physicians of Edinburgh in 1904. He then practised in Bath for a while before returning to Australia to practice as a consulting physician in Sydney.

Appointed an honorary physician at St Vincent's Hospital, Sydney, in 1912, Bullmore treated leading Australian cricketer Victor Trumper during Trumper's final days suffering from Bright's disease. In 1913 Bullmore was appointed honorary physician at the Prince of Wales Hospital, Sydney, and was an honorary major in the Australian Army Medical Corps and one of the founders of the Royal Australasian College of Physicians.

While Bullmore retired from rugby, soccer and rowing to concentrate on his medical career, he continued to be involved in sporting interests, including motor cycling, tennis, golf and angling.

Bullmore died suddenly at his residence "Altona" in Point Piper, Sydney on 28 December 1937. His funeral was held at All Saints Church, Woollahra and was cremated. His estate was worth £9,944.

== Personal life ==
Bullmore married Melbourne-born Elfrida Buttner, the daughter of Dr Alexander Buttner, at St Andrew's Church, Ashley-place, London on 24 August 1904 and together they had a son and four daughters. Bullmore's son Herbert James Bullmore was a Flyer-Officer in the Royal Australian Air Force who was killed in action in New Guinea during World War II, while one of Bullmore's daughters was Mary Horden, fashion editor of the Australian Women's Weekly from 1946 to 1957 and another was Gretel Packer, the wife of Frank Packer and the mother of Kerry Packer.
