= Francis James =

Australian publisher

Francis James

Alfred Francis Phillip James (21 April 1918 – 24 August 1992) was an Australian publisher known for being imprisoned in China as a spy.

== Early life and education ==
Alfred Francis Phillip James was born on 21 April 1918 in Queenstown, Tasmania the son of an Anglican priest. His early life was unsettled as his father moved between parishes. He attended Fort Street High School in 1932 and then later attended Canberra Grammar School in 1934, meeting his lifelong friend Gough Whitlam (who later became Prime Minister of Australia). He was expelled the next year after a theological dispute with the headmaster. He completed his Leaving Certificate in 1936.

Between 1937 and 1939 James served with the Royal Australian Air Force (RAAF). At the outbreak of World War II, James travelled to Britain and joined the Royal Air Force, enlisting on the last day of the Battle of Britain. After pilot training and operations, he was shot down over France on Anzac Day, 25 April 1942, receiving severe burns to his face and eyes. He was captured, caused a great deal of trouble in German military hospitals and POW camps, and was then repatriated, through Cairo Red Cross, because of his injuries. He was formally invalided out of the Royal Air Force in April 1945 and received a Totally and Permanently Incapacitated pension from the British Government for the rest of his life. In the same month he married Joyce Staff in London.

== Publishing career ==
After returning to Australia, James was employed as a journalist with The Sydney Morning Herald in 1950. He was a distinctive figure, habitually wearing a black broad-brimmed hat and a cloak.

In 1952, James took over management of The Anglican, a publication of the Church of England in Australia, as the Anglican Church of Australia was then called. In 1957 James established the Anglican Press Ltd to print The Anglican and other publications. The Anglican Press went into receivership in 1960, and was subject to a takeover bid by Frank Packer's Australian Consolidated Press (ACP). This coincided with competition between Sir Frank Packer and Rupert Murdoch for the share of the suburban newspaper market. In turn that led to a notorious brawl at the Anglican Press between Clyde and Kerry Packer, on the one hand, and James and the journalist and former boxer Frank Browne, on the other. James and Browne were the victors.

Controversy continued when in 1964, James was fined £50 for the offensive publication of the Oz magazine.

During the 1960s he used The Anglican to campaign against the Vietnam War and in 1966 stood as a candidate for the Liberal Reform Group in the federal election. He visited North Vietnam twice.

== Imprisonment in China ==
In spring 1969, James travelled to China with the support of an Australian senator, and while there he "ran into a man I had met before, a Uighur of enormous influence in Sinkiang". After touring China's nuclear facilities, he published an exposé in The Sunday Times and elsewhere entitled "The first Western look at the secret H-bomb centre in China". He identified four personnel in China's nuclear programme, listed accurately the details of China's early nuclear tests from October 1964 onwards, and wrote of China's ambitious settlement policy to outnumber the Uyghurs in the northwest. The exposé "brought denials from the Chinese and criticism from a number of professional China watchers."

James went on to the United Kingdom and (in October 1969) Hong Kong followed by Guangdong, China where he was arrested on November 4 for alleged spying. After over three years' imprisonment, described as "constant interrogation and solitary confinement", he was released and expelled in 1973 after lobbying by his old friend Gough Whitlam, who was then Prime Minister.

== Death ==
Francis James died on 24 August 1992, aged 74.
