= Clyde Packer =

Australian politician (1935–2001)

The Honourable Clyde Packer

Member of the New South Wales Legislative Council
- In office 23 April 1964 – 22 April 1976
- Preceded by: Henry Thompson
- Succeeded by: Bill Sandwith

Personal details
- Born: Robert Clyde Packer; 22 July 1935 Sydney, New South Wales, Australia
- Died: 8 April 2001 (aged 65) Santa Barbara, California, United States
- Party: Liberal Party
- Height: 191 cm (6 ft 3 in)
- Spouses: Angela Money (m. 1961–1972); Kate Clifford (m. 1977–2001)
- Relations: R. C. Packer (paternal grandfather); Herbert Bullmore (maternal grandfather); Kerry Packer (brother); James Packer (nephew)
- Children: 1
- Parent: Frank Packer (father)
- Education: Cranbrook School, Sydney; Geelong Grammar School
- Occupation: Media proprietor; Chairman, Australian Consolidated Press (formerly); Chairman, Nine Network (formerly); Politician
- Known for: Packer family

Robert Clyde Packer (22 July 1935 – 8 April 2001), usually known as Clyde Packer, was the son of Australian newspaper magnate Frank Packer and the elder brother of media baron Kerry Packer. From 23 April 1964 to 22 April 1976, he was a member of the New South Wales Legislative Council, representing the Liberal Party. Packer was originally intended to be his father's heir before a falling-out in 1972 resulted in Kerry inheriting the family business upon Frank's death in 1974.

Among his many business activities, Packer founded the independent Spin Records label, which released many successful singles and albums from 1966 to 1972, including The Bee Gees' "Spicks and Specks" (1966) and the original Australian cast recording of the rock musical Hair (1969). In 1976, Packer relocated to the United States, initially living in Los Angeles before moving to Santa Barbara, California. Robert Clyde Packer died of heart and lung failure on 8 April 2001, aged 65.

== Early life ==
Clyde Packer was born Robert Clyde Packer on 22 July 1935. He was named for his paternal grandfather, Robert Clyde Packer (1879–1934), who had established the Packer media dynasty. Clyde's father was Sir Frank Packer (1906–1974), a media proprietor who controlled Australian Consolidated Press and the Nine Network. His mother, Gretel Joyce née Bullmore (1907–1960), was the daughter of Herbert Bullmore (1874–1937), an Australian-born physician and rugby union player who represented Scotland. His younger brother was Kerry Packer (17 December 1937 – 26 December 2005).

During their early childhood Clyde and Kerry were cared for by a nurse, Inez McCracken, whom Clyde described as a "surrogate mother" who made "an unbearable childhood tolerable". Packer was a boarder at Cranbrook School in Sydney and then Geelong Grammar in Victoria. He took part in various sports at school, including boxing, cricket, and rugby.

== Media career ==
In the early 1950s, instead of attending university as he wished, Clyde Packer heeded his father's directive "You go to work for me ... You'll learn far more in the school of hard knocks". He joined Australian Consolidated Press (ACP) as a journalist and sub-editor of its flagship, The Daily Telegraph. For six months he worked at the Daily Mail in London. In 1954, ACP launched a magazine, Weekend, with Donald Horne as editor and Packer on staff. By 1956, Packer was a director at ACP, Frank purchased the rights to Sydney TV station TCN-9, the first Australian station to begin regular broadcasting. By 1957, Weekend employed Lillian Roxon as a journalist and later a sub-editor. When Queensland authorities wanted to ban the magazine, Packer and Horne successfully fought the injunction in court.

In February 1958, ACP followed with the launch of The Observer, an "intellectual magazine", of which Horne was editor and Packer was his boss. Packer allowed Horne to hire various contributors including Peter Coleman, Michael Baume, Bruce Beresford, Robert Hughes, Barry Humphries, and James McAuley. Packer was later the talent manager for Humphries. In 1958, Packer hired Francis James of Anglican Press to print The Observer but, after three years and a run of "broken deadlines, overcharges, misprints, [and] slow deliveries", Horne and Packer took that job away.

In 1960, ACP was involved in a commercial rivalry with Rupert Murdoch's News Limited, over interests in print media in Sydney. ACP had made an offer to buy Anglican Press when it was placed in receivership so that they could publish suburban newspapers in opposition to Murdoch's recent acquisitions. In June 1960 the rivalry between the two groups turned into a physical brawl where men hired by Murdoch fought with Packer, Kerry and their associates over the control of Anglican Press building. The Murdoch group had a photographer take evidence of the fracas and their afternoon newspaper, The Daily Mirror, ran a front-page article headlined "Knight's Sons in City Brawl" with a photo of Packer ejecting the manager of Anglican Press, John Willis, into the street. Also that year Frank bought majority interests in Melbourne TV station GTV-9 which was combined with TCN-9 to form Australia's first national network, Nine Network.

In 1961, Packer was promoted to assistant general manager of ACP. During that year, two ACP publications Weekend and The Australian Woman's Mirror were merged to form Everybody's with Horne editing and Packer as its manager. In 1965, Packer was made general manager of ACP and founded a record label, also called Everybody's, as a joint venture with Harry M. Miller (New Zealand-born promoter) and Nat Kipner, a record producer and former co-owner of Sunshine Records. However Sydney radio stations were reluctant to play singles issued by that label due to the promotion of ACP's magazine. In January the following year the label was re-launched as Spin Records with Kipner as house producer. During that year Spin Records signed The Bee Gees and issued their hit single, "Spicks and Specks", which reached No. 4 on the Go-Set National Top 40.

During the late-1960s, Packer took on more of the administration of Network Nine while Spin Records continued to release singles and albums by various Australian artists. In June 1969, Miller produced the Australian stage version of Hair, a rock musical. Spin Records issued the soundtrack, Hair – Australian Cast Soundtrack, by the end of the year, which was banned in Queensland and New Zealand.

=== Dispute with father ===
In 1970, Clyde Packer became joint managing director of Nine Network with his father, Frank. Clyde later recalled: "[I]t was a very equitable arrangement ... I had the responsibility and he had the authority". Late in the next year, Clyde Packer launched A Current Affair on the Nine network, with Mike Willesee hosting. In 1972, Willesee organised for A Current Affair to have an on-air interview with then-union leader, Bob Hawke, during an industrial dispute. When Frank heard of the arrangement he vetoed the decision to allow Hawke on his network, undermining Clyde's authority. Willesee later declared: "You can't run a current affairs program, as you couldn't run a serious newspaper, and have people tell you you can't have the leader of the Trade Union movement". Packer resigned from his posts at the Nine Network and ACP, and later reflected on the split: "I suspect my father was as glad to get rid of me as I was to get rid of him".

Their public falling-out followed years of tight control by Frank. According to Paul Barry, "Clyde Packer ... was also frequently dressed down and abused in public by his father, Sir Frank. Into his late thirties, Clyde was still treated like a stupid, disobedient little boy, until he could take no more and rebelled against such tyranny, splitting clearly and completely with his father". On his father's death in May 1974, the family estate, valued at A$100 million passed directly to Kerry. In 1976, Clyde sold his quarter-share of the family business for A$4 million to Kerry, who went on to become Australia's richest man.

== Political career ==
Clyde Packer had joined the Liberal Party in 1954. He became vice-president of the Paddington-Waverley branch and a member of the Bligh state electorate conference. On 21 November 1963, he was elected as a Member of the New South Wales Legislative Council, with his appointment starting on 23 April 1964 and ending on 22 April 1976. Frank had a meeting with then-Prime Minister, Robert Menzies, during which they discussed a possible diplomatic appointment for Frank, which Menzies declined. Menzies helped Clyde draft his maiden speech to the parliament.

Packer was the Honorary Treasurer of the Children's Surgical Research Fund, a member of New South Wales Society for Crippled Children and New South Wales Committee Council for Civil Liberties. Although a conservative politician, Packer supported freedom of speech, and he voted against a bill to ban pornography. During early 1974 he worked with New South Wales Premier, Robert Askin, to develop a series of ads run by John Singleton's agency against the incumbent Prime Minister, Gough Whitlam, and his Australian Labor Party in the lead up to the federal election in May.

== Counter-cultural involvement ==
After Clyde Packer's resignation from the family's media interests in 1972, he became briefly involved in the counter-culture, famously donning a kaftan and claiming that it was "better than dieting". In the next year, Packer established an adult sex magazine, Forum, with Bettina Arndt as consulting editor, and later editor and then publisher. In March that year, he explained his motivation for launching the new magazine in the context of changes in the role of sexuality.

He moved to California in 1976 and rarely returned to Australia thereafter. In America, he pursued interests in film, surf culture, and magazine publishing. He bought Surfing Magazine in 1976 and, during the mid-1980s, he expanded his interests by establishing the sister magazines, Bodyboarding Magazine and Volleyball. In 1984, Packer released a book, No Return Ticket, in which he interviewed nine fellow Australian expatriates: Robert Hughes, Gordon Chater, Graham Fraser, Dame Judith Anderson, James Wolfensohn, Germaine Greer, Maxwell Newton, Zoe Caldwell and Sumner Locke Elliott. According to Mark Thomas of The Canberra Times, the book was a "quirky, frothy anachronism", in which the interviewees "whinge about the Australian cultural cringe in terms which no young Australian would find comprehensible".

Also during 1984, the Costigan Commission issued a draft report into its investigation into the Painters and Dockers Union which implicated a prominent businessman, codenamed the "Goanna", in tax evasion and organised crime activities. In September that year, news reports published leaked case summaries and Kerry outed himself as the "Goanna" but denied all allegations. When Clyde Packer was contacted he observed that his brother "had his rights trampled on and his name defamed". The Costigan Commission had also contacted the FBI and DEA to investigate Clyde Packer's own activities, after a US surfing official claimed that one of Packer's local magazines was a front for drug-trafficking. He was never officially accused of any wrongdoing related to those investigations. Later, he was publicly exonerated and it was revealed that the FBI questioned the evidence that the commission provided.

In January 1987, Packer told Ali Cromie of The Sydney Morning Herald that he had left Australia because he "would have a better future in America than Australia". Initially Packer had made documentaries but most of his subsequent work was in publishing. He also ran a consultancy business, Magazine Investment and Management. Of Clyde's relationship with his brother Kerry, Cromie wrote: "They got on well without being especially close. He disputes reports that portray their relationship in any other way. 'I had animosity with my father – never with my brother'".

== Personal life ==
On 25 May 1961, Clyde Packer married Angela May Money (born 9 March 1938). Angela was the elder daughter of Dr. Rex Money, a Macquarie Street specialist and neurosurgeon, and Dorothy "Noppy" née Wilkinson. The couple were married at All Saints Church, Woollahra with Kerry as best man and David Halliday as groomsman. Clyde and Angela had a son, Francis Clyde Packer. In 1972, Packer and Angela divorced.

Packer had relocated to Los Angeles by 1976 where he married his second wife, Kate Clifford, a former model from Brisbane, on 7 July 1977. By 1987, Clyde and Kate were living in the Santa Barbara suburb of Montecito. Clyde developed heart and kidney problems. He was on a dialysis machine for treatment and had a kidney donated by his architect. From 1999, he had been bedridden for two years. (His brother Kerry also had heart and kidney problems and obtained a new kidney from his helicopter pilot.) Robert Clyde Packer died of heart and lung failure on 8 April 2001, aged 65. A memorial service for him was held in Sydney on 16 May 2001, including a eulogy, "Dear Clyde", written by Barry Humphries and read by Packer's son, Francis. Other speakers at the memorial were John Laws, Harry M. Miller and Peter Coleman.

In the TV mini-series, Power Games: The Packer-Murdoch War (September 2013), Clyde Packer was portrayed by Alexander England.

== Bibliography ==
- Minogue, Dennis; Packer, Clyde (September 1977). "Packer's $15 million deal". New Times. 1 (Sept 1977). Sydney: 4–10.
- Packer, Clyde (April 1983). "Sir John Monash [Book Review]". Quadrant. 27 (4). Sydney: 88–90. ISSN 0033-5002.
- Packer, Clyde (1984), No Return Ticket, Angus & Robertson, ISBN 978-0-207-15028-9
- Packer, Clyde (July 1984). "Computers: Santa Barbara letter". Quadrant. 28 (7–8). Sydney: 59–60. ISSN 0033-5002.
- Packer, Clyde (November 1984). "An interview with Sumner Locke Elliott". Quadrant. 28 (11). Sydney: 19–23. ISSN 0033-5002.
- Packer, Clyde; Coleman, Peter (October 1991). Interview with Clyde Packer, journalist (audio cassette). OCLC 220861187.
