= Bill and hold =

Transaction noting revenue before delivery

A bill and hold transaction occurs when a company recognizes revenue before delivery takes place. Normally a revenue is not recognizable until goods are delivered or services are rendered. Exceptions are made when a customer specifically requests that the vendor delay delivery and has a legitimate business reason for the request.

== Alleged abuse by Nortel ==
Nortel Networks Corporation was a multinational telecommunications equipment manufacturer headquartered in Mississauga, Ontario, Canada. During and right after the optical boom years, Nortel allegedly used bill and hold transactions to inflate the company's revenues during some quarters, allowing company executives to earn millions in bonuses.
