= Jodhi Meares =

Australian glamour model (born 1971)

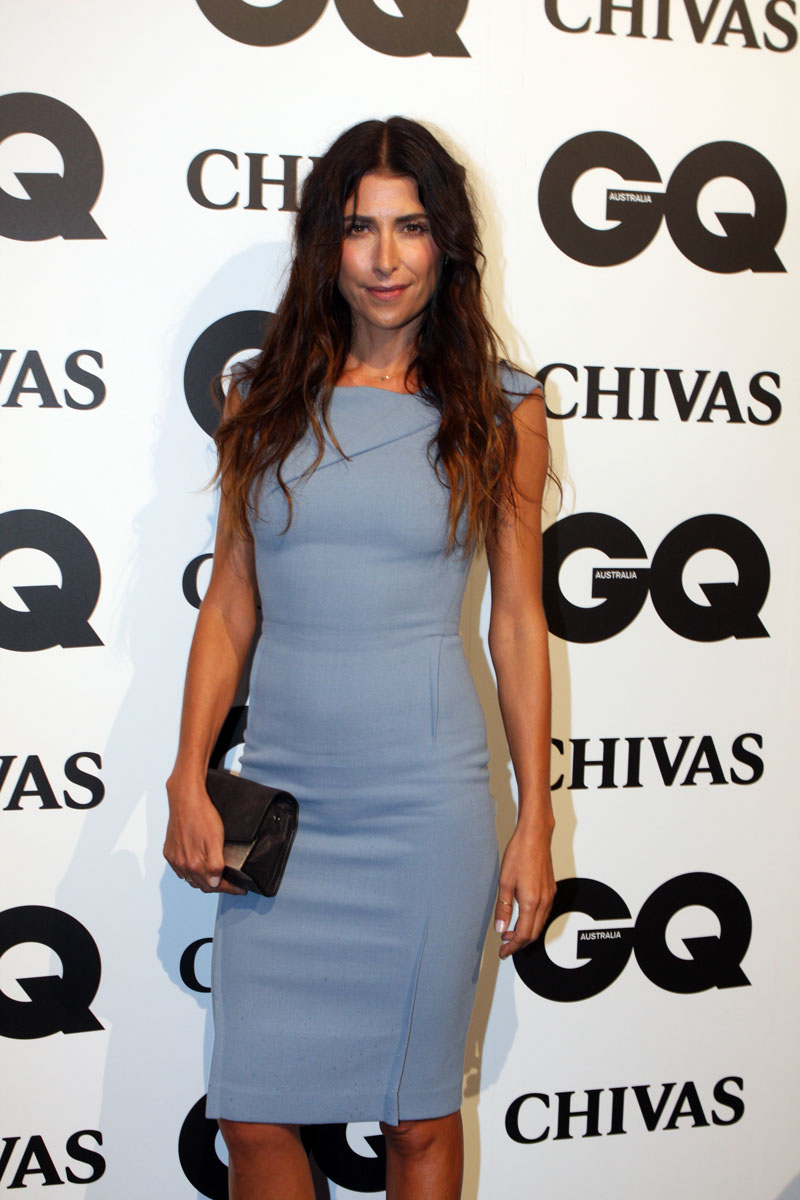
- Born: Jodie Kayla Meares; 24 March 1971 (age 55)
- Other names: Jodie Meares, Jodie Packer, Jodhi Packer
- Spouse: James Packer (m. 1999; div. 2002)
- Modeling information
- Hair color: Brown
- Agency: FHM Management

Jodhi Meares (born 24 March 1971) is an Australian glamour model, television personality and fashion designer.

== Personal life ==
On 23 October 1999, Meares married billionaire Australian media businessman James Packer at Packer's home at Bellevue Hill, Sydney. They separated in June 2002. In late 2015, Meares quietly married Nicholas Finn Tsindos, a 29-year-old photographer, on a beach in Hawaii. The marriage was not confirmed publicly until February 2016. Meares and Tsindos split up after 14 months.
