= Ellerston, New South Wales =

Ellerston
- Suburb
- Ellerston Pastoral station

- Coordinates: 31°48′54″S 151°19′4″E
- Country: Australia
- State: New South Wales
- Region: Hunter
- LGA: Upper Hunter Shire
- Location: 322 km (200 mi) N of Sydney; 68 km (42 mi) NE of Scone

Government
  - State electorate: Upper Hunter
  - Federal division: Hunter

Population
  - Total: 131 (2016 census)
- Time zone: UTC+10 (AEST)
  - Summer (DST): UTC+11 (AEDT)
- Postcode: 2337
- County: Durham
- Parish: Mamaran

Ellerston is a rural locality of the Upper Hunter Shire local government area, about 68 kilometres (42 mi) north-east of Scone in the Upper Upper Hunter Region of New South Wales, Australia. It is about 322 km (200 mi) from Sydney, the state capital.

== Ellerston Pastoral ==
Ellerston Pastoral station is a large property that was owned by media mogul Kerry Packer and since his death is run by other members of the Packer family. The property's primary purpose is as a cattle and sheep station, running 11,000 Hereford cattle and 6500 Merino wethers.

The property also boasts some of Australia's best polo fields. In 2004, its golf course was rated number four in Australia, and, in 2020, was rated number 19 in the world by Golf Digest. The course, which was designed by Greg Norman and Bob Harrison, is exclusive and open only to members and guests, so, on some weeks, only six people play golf there. The property is like many of the properties that allegedly have low rent from the government. Allegedly, the low rent as within the newspaper in 2003 shows the farm was being provided the land at a minimal rent. However this rental agreement only applies to 2% of the total land area of the overall property.
