= Kerry Packer =

Australian publishing, media and gaming tycoon (1937–2005)

Kerry Packer AC
- Packer at Parliament House in 1991
- Born: Kerry Francis Bullmore Packer; 17 December 1937; Sydney, New South Wales, Australia
- Died: 26 December 2005 (aged 68); Sydney, New South Wales, Australia
- Resting place: Ellerston, New South Wales, Australia
- Education: Geelong Grammar School; Cranbrook School; Canberra Grammar School
- Occupation: Media proprietor
- Years active: 1960−2005
- Known for: Ownership of Channel Nine; Other media and journalism interests; World Series Cricket
- Board member of: Nine Network; Publishing and Broadcasting Limited; Australian Consolidated Press
- Spouse: Roslyn Weedon AC (m. 1963; wid. 2005)
- Children: Gretel and James Packer
- Parents: Sir Frank Packer KBE, OStJ (father); Gretel Bullmore (mother)
- Relatives: Clyde Packer (brother); Robert Clyde Packer (grandfather); Herbert Bullmore (grandfather)

Kerry Francis Bullmore Packer (17 December 1937 – 26 December 2005) was an Australian media tycoon, and was considered one of Australia's most powerful media proprietors of the twentieth century. The Packer family company owned a controlling interest in both the Nine Network and the publishing company Australian Consolidated Press, which were later merged to form Publishing and Broadcasting Limited (PBL). Outside Australia, Packer was best known for founding World Series Cricket. At the time of his death, he was the richest and one of the most influential men in Australia. In 2004, Business Review Weekly magazine estimated Packer's net worth at A$6.5 billion.

== Early life ==
Kerry Packer was born on 17 December 1937 in Sydney, Australia. His father was Sir Frank Packer, an Australian media proprietor who controlled Australian Consolidated Press and the Nine Network. His mother, Gretel Bullmore, was the daughter of Herbert Bullmore, the Scottish rugby union player. He had an older brother, Clyde Packer. He took part in various sports at school, including boxing, cricket, and rugby; though he struggled academically, possibly due to undiagnosed dyslexia. On his father's death in 1974, the family estate, valued at $100 million, passed directly to Packer. His father had fallen out with his elder son, Clyde, in 1972.

== Business ==
Packer, through his family company Consolidated Press Holdings, was the major shareholder with a 37% holding in Publishing and Broadcasting Limited (PBL). Until Packer's death PBL owned the Nine television network, and Australian Consolidated Press which produces many of Australia's top-selling magazines. He was involved in a number of other gambling and tourism ventures, notably Crown Casino in Melbourne. The Nine Network and Australian Consolidated Press businesses have since been divested to PBL Media.

Packer was widely respected in business circles, courted by politicians on both sides, and was widely regarded as one of the most astute businessmen of his time, despite having been a poor student.

Despite Packer's reputation as a good businessman and his profitable investments, he was not a self-made man—his grandfather, Robert Clyde Packer, and his father, Sir Frank Packer, had built up the media empire and its related holdings over many decades. As noted by internet news outlet Crikey, had Packer's $100 million inheritance had been invested in the Australian sharemarket in September 1974 through a balanced portfolio of the top 200 companies, that portfolio would be worth significantly above $6.9 billion in December 2005, possibly as much as $11 billion.

Packer controlled Nine Network and Nine's Wide World of Sports in the 1980s, and "famously sold the network to Alan Bond and then bought it back three years later for less than a quarter of the price." Writes the Sydney Morning Herald, "Packer's decision to sell Nine to Bond in 1987 for $1.2 billion - before buying back the network in 1990 for $250 million - is legendary in Australian television."

Moreover, Packer was not the first choice to take over the running of the family's business empire—his father had intended that Kerry's elder brother, Clyde Packer, would take over the company, but Clyde fell out with his father in the early 1970s and left Australia permanently.

Kerry Packer's independent business life began after his father's death in 1974 when he inherited control of the family's controlling share in PBL, valued at A$100 million. Further, his principal Australian investments in television and casinos were highly protected from competition by government regulation which Packer and his employees worked very hard to have maintained.

The Packer family's business reputation suffered a blow following the 2001 collapse of One.Tel, a telephone company in which his son, James, had invested.

Kerry Packer was also one of Australia's largest landholders. In 2003, a deposit of rubies was discovered on one of his properties.

The Packer media empire included magazines, television networks, telecommunications, petrochemicals, heavy engineering, a 75% stake in the Perisher Blue ski resort, diamond exploration, coal mines and property, a share in the Foxtel cable TV network, and investments in the lucrative casino business in Australia and overseas.

== Media interests ==
=== The "Packer Empire" ===
The Packer family has long been involved in media. Packer's grandfather Robert Clyde Packer owned two Sydney newspapers while his father, Sir Frank Packer, was one of Australia's first media moguls, and Kerry's son, James, was executive chairman of PBL, before resigning in 2008. Sir Frank wanted Kerry to experience work in the newspaper industry from the ground up, so Packer started in the loading dock of the Sydney newspaper The Telegraph, loading papers. He was not originally destined for the role, but in the early 1970s Kerry took the place of the designated successor, his older brother, Clyde, after Clyde fell out with their father, quit PBL and moved to America. Kerry took over the running of PBL in 1974, on the death of his father.

=== Commonwealth Broadcasting Corporation ===
During the 1980s, Packer owned radio stations 2UE and 3AK. He decided to link both stations to form the ill-fated Commonwealth Broadcasting Corporation. With both stations networked, breakfast came from Melbourne's 3AK and everything else from Sydney's 2UE. The format lasted six months in 1986.

=== Alan Bond media buyback ===
In 1987, Packer made a fortune at the expense of disgraced tycoon Alan Bond. He reportedly sold Bond the Nine Network at the record price of A$1.05 billion in 1987, and then bought it back three years later for a mere A$250 million, when Bond's empire was collapsing. Packer later quipped, "You only get one Alan Bond in your lifetime, and I've had mine". Packer was then able to reinvest the proceeds in a 25% share in the Foxtel pay TV consortium.

After the sale to Bond, Packer said that he had regretted the decision to sell Nine and wished he had not gone through with the transaction. At the 2006 PBL AGM, Kerry's son, James, told of the true complexities of the deal. Kerry Packer received A$800 million in cash, with A$250 million left in Bond Media as subordinated debt. As Bond went under, Packer converted the subordinated debt into a 37% stake in Bond Media. About A$500 million of debt remained in Bond Media. Packer received $800 million in cash before receiving a free 37% equity stake that put a debt-included value of A$500 million on the Nine Network, which by then included Channel Nine in Brisbane.

=== Hands-on business approach ===
Packer sometimes took a direct interest in the editorial content of his papers, although he was far less interventionist than the notoriously hands-on Rupert Murdoch. Packer also occasionally interfered directly in the programming of his TV stations; in 1992, he called his Sydney station, TCN-9, and ordered its personnel to "Get that shit off the air!", referring to Australia's Naughtiest Home Videos hosted by Doug Mulray, which was cut during its first and only airing on national television. (It has since aired in its entirety.) He is also said to have often manipulated broadcasts of cricket himself, to ensure that the end of a cricket match was broadcast, despite previously set television broadcast schedules.

=== Government inquiry and legal challenges ===
Packer faced a 1991 Australian government inquiry into the print media industry with some reluctance, but great humour. When asked to state his full name and the capacity in which he appeared, he replied: "Kerry Francis Bullmore Packer. I appear here this afternoon reluctantly." Packer fronted the inquiry over allegations that he had some secret control over the content of the Fairfax papers (an organisation that Packer had wished to purchase for some time, but was restricted from by cross-ownership laws). During the inquiry, he repeatedly berated the politicians conducting it, and the government. When asked about his company's tax-minimisation schemes, he replied: "Of course I am minimising my tax. And if anybody in this country doesn't minimise their tax, they want their heads read, because as a government, I can tell you you're not spending it that well that we should be donating extra!"

At the time of his death, the Nine Network was the jewel in the PBL crown. Although it had a tough year in 2005 against rival Seven Network (which was aided largely by US TV hits such as Desperate Housewives and Lost), Nine still finished the year as the number-one network.

== World Series Cricket ==
Outside Australia, Packer was best known for founding World Series Cricket. In 1977 the Nine Network cricket rights deal led to a confrontation with the cricket authorities, as top players from several countries rushed to join him at the expense of their international sides.

One of the leaders of the "rebellion" was England captain Tony Greig, who remained a commentator on the Nine Network's payroll until his death in December 2012. Packer's aim was to secure broadcasting rights for Australian cricket, and he was largely successful. In the 1970s the global cricket establishment fiercely opposed Packer in the courts. To counter the establishment, Packer hired the ten best Queen's Counsels in the UK and put them on retainers, stipulating that they were not to take on any additional work during the court case (the sole purpose of which was to deny the establishment the best legal minds to prosecute their case) . When he died he was mourned with a minute's silence at the MCG as one of the most influential figures in the history of the sport.

Packer was famously quoted from a 1976 meeting with the Australian Cricket Board, with whom he met to negotiate the rights to televise cricket. According to witnesses, he said: "There is a little bit of the whore in all of us, gentlemen. What is your price?"

== World Rugby Corporation ==
Packer funded the World Rugby Corporation (WRC), a company formed by lawyer Geoff Levy and former Wallaby player Ross Turnbull. Both wanted a professional worldwide rugby union competition in 1995. A majority of the All Blacks and Wallaby teams signed up to the WRC. In response, the Australian, New Zealand and South African rugby unions formed SANZAR, who partnered with News Limited to launch two professional competitions, the Super 12 and Tri Nations Series. The South African Rugby Union told the Springboks players that they would never play for their country again if they committed to the WRC, and they remained with the SARU. Most of the All Blacks then followed them, and finally the Wallabies did too, so the WRC project was abandoned.

== Controversy ==
Packer was often the centre of controversy. One of the earliest incidents occurred on 7 June 1960, when his father was trying to take over the Anglican Press, a small publisher run by Francis James. According to author Richard Neville, Frank Packer was angered by James's refusal to sell the Anglican Press, so he sent Kerry and some burly friends to pressure him into selling. They forced their way in and reportedly began vandalising the premises, but James was able to barricade himself in his office and call Rupert Murdoch, Packer's most powerful rival. Murdoch quickly dispatched his own team of 'heavies', who threw Kerry and friends out. Not surprisingly, the Murdoch press had a field day with the news that the son of Australia's biggest media tycoon had been caught brawling in the street.

Like Murdoch, Packer's critics saw his ever-expanding cross-media holdings as a potential threat to media diversity and freedom of speech. He also repeatedly came under fire for his companies' alleged involvement in tax evasion schemes and for the extremely low amounts of company tax that his corporations are reported to have paid over the years. He fought repeated battles with the Australian Taxation Office over his corporate taxes.

His most severe legal challenge came in 1984 with the Costigan Commission alleging (using the codename of "the squirrel", renamed "the Goanna" in media reports) that he was involved in tax evasion and organised crime, including drug trafficking. He successfully counter-attacked the commission with the assistance of his counsel Malcolm Turnbull. In 1987, the charges were formally dismissed by Attorney-General Lionel Bowen. Mystery surrounded Packer's receipt of a "loan" of A$225,000 in cash from Brian Ray, a bankrupt Queensland businessman. When questioned about this transaction at the Costigan Royal Commission, Packer said "...I like cash. I have a squirrel mentality. I like to keep money in cash. It is by no means the most cash I ever had in my life."

Notwithstanding the significant efforts made to preserve his security and privacy, Packer suffered two mysterious break-ins at his companies' headquarters in Park Street, Sydney:

- In 1995, 25 gold bars, weighing a total of 285 kilograms (628 lb)—equivalent to A$23.3 million at 2022 gold prices—and a Vegemite jar full of gold nuggets were stolen from Packer's personal safe;
- In 2003, a licensed Glock 9-millimetre (0.35 in) semi-automatic pistol was stolen from a desk drawer on the executive level. Packer was not charged with failing to "keep safe" the weapon, but he did subsequently surrender his firearms licence.

Packer broke the sports boycott of apartheid South Africa which prevented South African sportsmen from representing their country when he recruited a number of South African cricketers to play on his World Series Cricket Team. His timing was criticised, coming just months after the Soweto riots and the death of Steve Biko, murdered by the members of the South African security forces.

== Personal life ==
Packer's primary schooling suffered greatly when he was struck with a severe bout of poliomyelitis at age eight, and he was confined to an iron lung for nine months. His father apparently thought little of his son's abilities, once cruelly describing him as "the family idiot", although Kerry subsequently steered PBL to heights far beyond anything his father or brother achieved. The nickname his father gave Kerry made him strive to new heights in schooling, trying to achieve "A" grades. His end of year report said he was one of the most notable students. In an interview, former employee Trevor Sykes stated that "He didn't read much on the printed page. If you didn't want Kerry to read something, you wrote more than a one-page memo."

Packer's grandfather Herbert Bullmore represented the Scotland national rugby union team in an international match against Ireland in Dublin in 1902 and worked as a doctor in Sydney for many years.

Kerry Packer and his wife of 42 years, Roslyn Packer (nee Weedon), had two children: a daughter, Gretel, and a son, James. At the time of Packer's death, he and Ros had two grandchildren: Francesca then 10, and Ben, then 7, from Gretel's first marriage to British financier Nick Barham, and Gretel and her husband Shane Murray were expecting their first child together, William (born 2006). Gretel and Shane married just before Packer's death.

Packer conducted extra-marital affairs with a number of women including the model Carol Lopes, who reportedly committed suicide after being shunned by Packer; publisher and former ConPress employee Ita Buttrose and Julie Trethowan, his long-time mistress and manager (from 1983) of the Packer-owned Sydney city health and fitness club, the Hyde Park Club. After his death, The Sydney Morning Herald reported that from about 1995, Packer transferred control of multimillion-dollar Sydney real estate holdings to Trethowan.

In June 2009, the Sydney Morning Herald reported that former federal opposition leader and future Australian Prime Minister, Malcolm Turnbull, a former legal adviser and business associate of Packer, revealed to journalist Annabel Crabb that Packer had threatened to have him killed when they fell out over their 1991 attempt to take over the Fairfax newspaper group through their Tourang consortium. Packer reportedly made the threat after Turnbull told Packer he was going to have him thrown out of the consortium by revealing Packer's intention to play an interventionist role in the newspaper group.

He told me he'd kill me, yeah. I didn't think he was completely serious, but I didn't think he was entirely joking either. Look, he could be pretty scary. He did threaten to kill me and I said to him: "Well, you'd better make sure that your assassin gets me first because, if he misses, you better know I won't miss you." He could be a complete pig, you know. He could charm the birds out of the trees, but he could be a brute.

— Malcolm Turnbull, 4 June 2009, as reported in The Sydney Morning Herald

Packer was a supporter of South Sydney Rabbitohs in the National Rugby League competition.

He was an advocate of the Australian Republic Movement.

=== Polo ===
Packer was a keen polo player. In 1992, he and Gonzalo Pieres Sr. founded Ellerstina, a polo team that has claimed multiple titles at the Argentine Open and other high-handicap tournaments. Packer bought the Fyning Hill estate in West Sussex and expanded it to over 400 acres. Packer built the headquarters for his Ellerston polo team at Fyning Hill, and would arrive at the estate in May for the three-month English polo season. Packer sold the estate to the Russian businessman Roman Abramovich in 1999 for £12 million.

=== Gambling ===
Packer was a long-time heavy smoker and an avid gambler, fabled for his large wins and losses. In 1999, a three-day losing streak at London casinos cost him almost A$28 million – the biggest reported gambling loss in British history.

Once he won A$33 million at the MGM Grand Casino in Las Vegas, and he often won as much as A$7 million each year during his annual holidays in the UK. Packer's visits were a risky affair for the casinos, as his wins and losses could make quite a difference to the finances of even bigger casinos. Packer was also known for his sometimes volcanic temper—and for his perennial contempt for journalists who sought to question his activities.

Packer is quoted for an exchange in a poker tournament at the Stratosphere Casino, where a Texan oil investor was attempting to engage him in a game of poker. Upon the Texan saying "I'm worth $60 million!", Packer apparently pulled out a coin and asked nonchalantly, "heads or tails?", referring to an A$120 million wager (according to Bob Stupak's biography). Some variations of the story put the sum at A$60 million to A$100 million and say the line was "I'll toss you for it".

In the late 1990s, he walked into a major London casino and played £15 million on four roulette tables on his own and lost it all. This has been confirmed by casino owners in South East England.

Former PGA professional John Daly said on the Full Send Podcast that Packer closed down the Desert Inn Casino (which was replaced by the Wynn Hotel) by winning 52 million dollars in one day and insisting they pay him in cash, as the previous day when he lost 8.2 million dollars they insisted he pay them in cash.

The Ritz Hotel in London even had its own room for Kerry Packer. There he was able to play blackjack with a minimum bet of £10,000 per hand. He once lost more than £19 million in this room.

== Failing health ==
Packer suffered as many as four heart attacks. In 1990, while playing polo at Warwick Farm, Sydney, he suffered a heart attack that left him clinically dead for seven minutes. Packer was revived by paramedics and then airlifted to St Vincent's Private Hospital, Sydney, and received bypass surgery from Dr Victor Chang, a pioneering cardiac surgeon. It was not common for an ambulance to have a defibrillator at the time – it was purely by chance that the ambulance which responded to the call had one fitted.

After recovering, Packer donated a large sum to the Ambulance Service of New South Wales to pay for equipping all NSW ambulances with a portable defibrillator (colloquially known as "Packer Whackers"). He told Nick Greiner "I'll go you 50/50", and the NSW State government paid the other half of the cost. He is reported to have said, "Son, I've been to the other side, and let me tell you, there's nothing there." And in a press conference, "...there's no one waiting there for you, there's no one to judge you, so you can do what you bloody well like".

He also suffered from a chronic kidney condition for many years, and in 2000, he made headlines when his long-serving helicopter pilot, Nick Ross, donated one of his own kidneys to Packer for transplantation. The story of the transplant was covered in detail by the Australian TV documentary program Australian Story, a rare occasion on which Packer granted a media interview (and, to the surprise of many, not to his own network; Australian Story is produced by the public network, ABC). After recovering from the operation, Packer launched an organ transplant association in memory of cricketer David Hookes.

== Death ==
Kerry Packer died of kidney failure on 26 December 2005, nine days after his 68th birthday, at home in Sydney, Australia, with his family by his bedside. Knowing that his health was failing, he instructed his doctors not to treat him with curative intent or by artificially prolonging his life with dialysis. He told his cardiologist earlier in the week that he was "running out of petrol" and wanted to "die with dignity". His private funeral service was held on 30 December 2005, at the family's country retreat, Ellerston, near Scone in the Hunter Valley. Having obtained council permission, he was buried on the Ellerston property near the polo field. It was reported in November 2011, both in the UK and Australia, that the grave was to be marked by a bronze statue of a horse's head by sculptor Nic Fiddian-Green, popularly known as Artemis but believed reverted to the name Fiddian-Green originally gave it: I Look Beyond for a Distant Land.

=== State memorial service ===
The Packer family accepted an offer of a state memorial service, which was held on 17 February 2006 at the Sydney Opera House. The granting of this taxpayer-funded honour was criticised by some members of the community, as Packer was notorious for his alleged tax minimisation. At the memorial service, close friend Alan Jones was Master of Ceremonies. The service featured speeches from his son, James; Russell Crowe on behalf of his daughter, Gretel; the Prime Minister in office at the time, John Howard; and the former cricketer Richie Benaud. Attendees included Tom Cruise (a friend of James Packer) and his then-partner Katie Holmes; Greg Norman; members of the Australian cricket team; and past and present figures from all sides of politics.

== Philanthropy ==
The Kerry Packer Civic Gallery within the Bob Hawke Prime Ministerial Centre of the University of South Australia was endowed by the Packer family.

== See also ==
- Kerry Packer Foundation
- Paper Giants: The Birth of Cleo
- Howzat! Kerry Packer's War
- Paper Giants: Magazine Wars
- Power Games: The Packer-Murdoch War
- Super League war
