= Frank Packer =

Australian media proprietor (1906–1974)

Sir Frank Packer KBE, OStJ
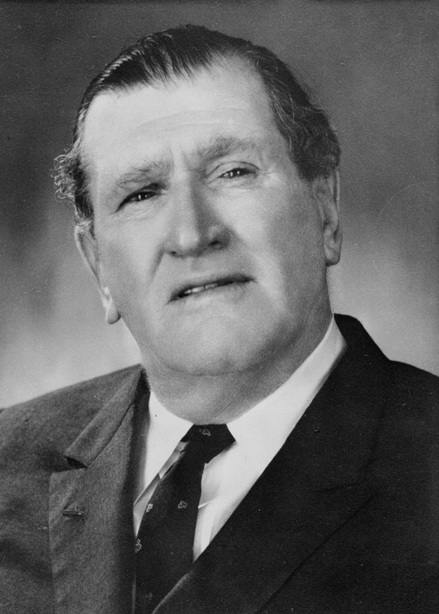
- Packer in 1968
- Born: Douglas Frank Hewson Packer; 3 December 1906; Kings Cross, Sydney, New South Wales, Australia
- Died: 1 May 1974 (aged 67); Royal Prince Alfred Hospital, Sydney, New South Wales, Australia
- Resting place: South Head Cemetery, Vaucluse, Sydney
- Education: Sydney Church of England Grammar School
- Occupation: Media proprietor
- Years active: 1923–1972
- Known for: Australian Consolidated Press; Nine Network
- Spouses: Gretel Bullmore (m. 1934–1960) Florence Vincent, nee Porges (m. 1964–1974)
- Children: Clyde Packer (eldest son); Kerry Packer (youngest son)
- Parent(s): R. C. Packer (father); Ethel Maude, née Hewson (mother)
- Relatives: Packer family

Sir Douglas Frank Hewson Packer KBE, OStJ (3 December 1906 – 1 May 1974), was an Australian media proprietor who controlled Australian Consolidated Press and the Nine Network. He was a patriarch of the Packer family.

== Early life ==
Frank Packer was born in Kings Cross, in the eastern suburbs of Sydney, New South Wales. His parents were Ethel Maude Packer (née Hewison; 1878–1947) and Robert Clyde Packer (1879–1934), who started the family's association with the media as a journalist in New South Wales. His father, R. C. Packer, became editor of The Sunday Times and was a founder of Smith's Weekly and the Daily Guardian, which was published by Smith's Newspapers Ltd.

"A mischievous youngster and a poor student", Packer frequently switched schools, attending Turramurra College, Abbotsholme College, Wahroonga Grammar School, and Sydney Church of England Grammar School at various times. He did not sit for the Intermediate Certificate.

== Career ==
In 1923, Packer became a cadet journalist on his father's paper, the Daily Guardian. Four years later, he was a director of the company. In 1933, Packer started the Australian Women's Weekly and then transformed The Daily Telegraph into one of Australia's leading newspapers.

Packer inherited his media interests on his father's death in 1934. In 1936, he joined with Ted Theodore's Sydney Newspapers and Associated Newspapers to form Australian Consolidated Press. He was chairman of ACP from 1936 until 1974.

When television was introduced to Australia in 1956, Packer, along with the other major newspaper publishers (Fairfax, the Herald & Weekly Times and David Syme), became a significant television network shareholder under the federal government's "dual formula", which allowed each capital city to have two commercial networks and one ABC. He launched the first Australian station to broadcast a regular schedule, TCN in Sydney, which became the nucleus of the Nine Network.

The Packer media empire was known for its conservative leanings, and was a strong backer of long-serving Prime Minister Robert Menzies.

Packer was a keen yachtsman, boxer, golfer and polo player. He was on the Australian Jockey Club's committee for 12 years and won the Caulfield Cup with his horse Columnist. He was also chairman of a syndicate that built the yachts Gretel and Gretel II to challenge for the America's Cup in 1962 and 1970.

In 1972, Sir Frank Packer sold his newspaper flagship, The Daily Telegraph, to Rupert Murdoch.

In 1992, journalist Max Walsh told the House of Representatives Select Committee on the Print Media that Frank Packer had exerted undue newsroom influence. "Sir Frank was knee-deep in [the] editorial policy of the Telegraph", Walsh said.

== Family life ==
Frank Packer was married to Gretel Joyce Bullmore (1907–1960) on 24 July 1934 at All Saints Anglican Church, Woollahra. He had two sons, Clyde and Kerry, with his first wife, Gretel. Gretel Packer died in 1960.

Packer married for the second time in June 1964 to Florence Adeline Vincent (née Porges) in London. She died in 2012.

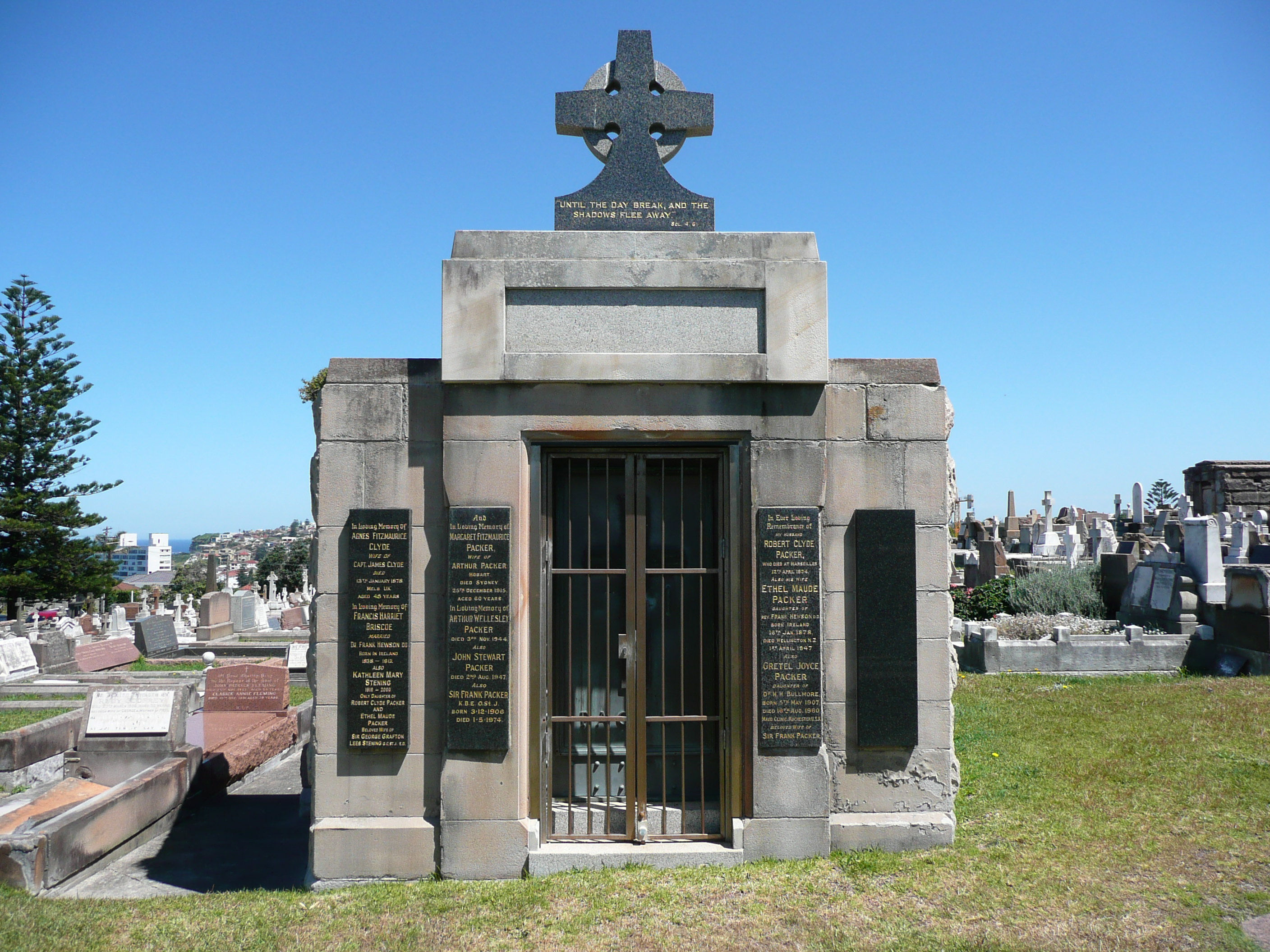
The Packer family tomb at South Head Cemetery in Vaucluse, New South Wales

== Death ==
On 1 May 1974, Packer died of heart failure at The Royal Prince Alfred Hospital, Camperdown of "Pneumonia and reticulum cell sarcoma". He was cremated at Northern Suburbs Crematorium and his ashes were interred within the Packer family mausoleum at South Head Cemetery.

His estate was valued for probate in 1975 at $2,393,703.11 which, adjusted for inflation, would account to $23,232,745.54 in 2023. Notable items declared in his estate, were paintings and sketches from some of Australia's most renowned artists, located at the family home, 'Cairnton' at Bellevue Hill was:

Penleigh Boyd:

- "Wattle Tree, signed and dated 1912" (oil on canvas)

Rupert Bunny:

- "Feeding the Ducks, signed"
- "Seated Woman with White Shawl, signed" (oil on canvas)

Sir William Dobell:

- "Sketch of Churchill's Hand giving the 'V' for victory sign, signed"
- "The Artist's Garden at Wangi, signed" (ink on paper)
- "The Artist's Garden and Balcony overlooking the Lake at Wangi, signed"
- "Woman in a Hamburger, signed and dated 1944" (oil on board)
- "Portrait of Helena Rubenstein, signed and dated 1959" (oil on board)
- "Boy in a white Lap Lap, signed and dated 1952" (oil on board)

Sir Russell Drysdale:

- "The Hangar" (watercolour and ink on pencil)
- "Men and Bird - Bass Straight, signed" (oil on canvas)

Robin Hill:

- "Grey Goshawke, signed, titled and dated 1958" (water colour)

John Perceval:

- "Cow bogged in a Swamp, signed and dated 1960"

Albert Tucker:

- "The Card Game, signed and dated 1958" (oil on board)

== Honours ==
Frank Packer was appointed a Commander of the Order of the British Empire (CBE) in the King's Birthday Honours of 1951.

He was knighted in the Queen's Birthday Honours of 1959, for services to journalism and the newspaper industry.

In the New Year's Honours of 1971 Sir Frank Packer was promoted within the Order of the British Empire to Knight Commander (KBE), for services to Australian and international yachting.

Since 1980 the Frank Packer Plate has been conducted at Randwick Racecourse.

He was inducted into the America's Cup Hall of Fame in 1999.

== Portrayal in media ==
In the 1984 television miniseries Bodyline, Packer, as employer of Donald Bradman, released him from a writing contract so he could play in the 1932–1933 Ashes; he was portrayed by Brian McDermott.

In the 1988 television miniseries The True Believers, Packer was portrayed by Australian actor Max Phipps.

In the 2007 television biopic The King about comedian Graham Kennedy, Packer was portrayed by Australian actor Leo Taylor.

In the 2011 television miniseries Paper Giants: The Birth of Cleo, Packer was portrayed by Australian actor Tony Barry.

In the 2013 television miniseries Power Games: The Packer-Murdoch War, Packer was played by Australian actor Lachy Hulme, who had previously portrayed Kerry Packer in Howzat! Kerry Packer's War the previous year.
