= Corporate governance =

Mechanisms, processes and relations by which corporations are controlled and operated

Corporate governance refers to the mechanisms, processes, practices, and relations by which corporations are controlled and operated by their boards of directors, managers, shareholders, and stakeholders. It defines how power and responsibilities are distributed within a company, how decisions are made and how performance is monitored. Effective corporate governance is essential for ensuring accountability, transparency and long-term sustainability of organizations which is seen especially in publicly traded companies.

== Definitions ==
"Corporate governance" may be defined, described or delineated in diverse ways, depending on the writer's purpose. Writers focused on a disciplinary interest or context (such as accounting, finance, corporate law, or management) often adopt narrow definitions that appear purpose specific. Writers concerned with regulatory policy in relation to corporate governance practices often use broader structural descriptions. A broad (meta) definition that encompasses many adopted definitions is "Corporate governance describes the processes, structures, and mechanisms that influence the control and direction of corporations."

This meta definition accommodates both the narrow definitions used in specific contexts and the broader descriptions that are often presented as authoritative. The latter include the structural definition from the Cadbury Report, which identifies corporate governance as "the system by which companies are directed and controlled" (Cadbury 1992, p. 15); and the relational-structural view adopted by the Organization for Economic Cooperation and Development (OECD) of "Corporate governance involves a set of relationships between a company's management, board, shareholders and stakeholders. Corporate governance also provides the structure and systems through which the company is directed, and its objectives are set, and the means of attaining those objectives and monitoring performance are determined" (OECD 2023, p. 6).

Examples of narrower definitions in particular contexts include:

- "a system of law and sound approaches by which corporations are directed and controlled focusing on the internal and external corporate structures with the intention of monitoring the actions of management and directors and thereby, mitigating agency risks which may stem from the misdeeds of corporate officers."
- "the set of conditions that shapes the ex post bargaining over the quasi-rents generated by a firm."

The firm itself is modelled as a governance structure acting through the mechanisms of contract. Here corporate governance may include its relation to corporate finance.

== Principles ==
Contemporary discussions of corporate governance tend to refer to principles raised in three documents released since 1990: The Cadbury Report (UK, 1992), the Principles of Corporate Governance (OECD, 1999, 2004, 2015 and 2023), and the Sarbanes–Oxley Act of 2002 (US, 2002). The Cadbury and Organisation for Economic Co-operation and Development (OECD) reports present general principles around which businesses are expected to operate to assure proper governance. The Sarbanes–Oxley Act, informally referred to as Sarbox or Sox, is an attempt by the federal government in the United States to legislate several of the principles recommended in the Cadbury and OECD reports.

- Rights and equitable treatment of shareholders: Organizations should respect the rights of shareholders and help shareholders to exercise those rights. They can help shareholders exercise their rights by openly and effectively communicating information and by encouraging shareholders to participate in general meetings.
- Interests of other stakeholders: Organizations should recognize that they have legal, contractual, social, and market driven obligations to non-shareholder stakeholders, including employees, investors, creditors, suppliers, local communities, customers, and policymakers.
- Role and responsibilities of the board: The board needs sufficient relevant skills and understanding to review and challenge management performance. It also needs adequate size and appropriate levels of independence and commitment.
- Integrity and ethical behavior: Integrity should be a fundamental requirement in choosing corporate officers and board members. Organizations should develop a code of conduct for their directors and executives that promotes ethical and responsible decision making.
- Disclosure and transparency: Organizations should clarify and make publicly known the roles and responsibilities of board and management to provide stakeholders with a level of accountability. They should also implement procedures to independently verify and safeguard the integrity of the company's financial reporting. Disclosure of material matters concerning the organization should be timely and balanced to ensure that all investors have access to clear, factual information.

=== Principal–agent conflict ===
Some concerns regarding governance follow from the potential for conflicts of interests that are a consequence of the non-alignment of preferences between: shareholders and upper management (principal–agent problems); and among shareholders (principal–principal problems), although other stakeholder relations are affected and coordinated through corporate governance.

In large firms where there is a separation of ownership and management, the principal–agent problem can arise between upper-management (the "agent") and the shareholder(s) (the "principals"). The shareholders and upper management may have different interests. The shareholders typically desire returns on their investments through profits and dividends, while upper management may also be influenced by other motives, such as management remuneration or wealth interests, working conditions and perquisites, or relationships with other parties within (e.g., management-worker relations) or outside the corporation, to the extent that these are not necessary for profits. Those pertaining to self-interest are usually emphasized in relation to principal-agent problems. The effectiveness of corporate governance practices from a shareholder perspective might be judged by how well those practices align and coordinate the interests of the upper management with those of the shareholders. However, corporations sometimes undertake initiatives, such as climate activism and voluntary emission reduction, that seem to contradict the idea that rational self-interest drives shareholders' governance goals.

An example of a possible conflict between shareholders and upper management materializes through stock repurchases (treasury stock). Executives may have incentive to divert cash surpluses to buying treasury stock to support or increase the share price. However, that reduces the financial resources available to maintain or enhance profitable operations. As a result, executives can sacrifice long-term profits for short-term personal gain. Shareholders may have different perspectives in this regard, depending on their own time preferences, but it can also be viewed as a conflict with broader corporate interests (including preferences of other stakeholders and the long-term health of the corporation).

=== Principal–principal conflict (the multiple principal problem) ===
The principal–agent problem can be intensified when upper management acts on behalf of multiple shareholders—which is often the case in large firms (see Multiple principal problem). Specifically, when upper management acts on behalf of multiple shareholders, the multiple shareholders face a collective action problem in corporate governance, as individual shareholders may lobby upper management or otherwise have incentives to act in their individual interests rather than in the collective interest of all shareholders. As a result, there may be free-riding in steering and monitoring of upper management, or conversely, high costs may arise from duplicate steering and monitoring of upper management. Conflict may break out between principals, and this all leads to increased autonomy for upper management.

Ways of mitigating or preventing these conflicts of interests include the processes, customs, policies, laws, and institutions which affect the way a company is controlled—and this is the challenge of corporate governance. To solve the problem of governing upper management under multiple shareholders, corporate governance scholars have figured out that the straightforward solution of appointing one or more shareholders for governance is likely to lead to problems because of the information asymmetry it creates. Shareholders' meetings are necessary to arrange governance under multiple shareholders, and it has been proposed that this is the solution to the problem of multiple principals due to median voter theorem: shareholders' meetings lead power to be devolved to an actor that approximately holds the median interest of all shareholders, thus causing governance to best represent the aggregated interest of all shareholders.

=== Other themes ===
An important theme of governance is the nature and extent of corporate accountability. A related discussion at the macro level focuses on the effect of a corporate governance system on economic efficiency, with a strong emphasis on shareholders' welfare. This has resulted in a literature focused on economic analysis. A comparative assessment of corporate governance principles and practices across countries was published by Aguilera and Jackson in 2011.

== Models ==
Different models of corporate governance differ according to the variety of capitalism in which they are embedded. The Anglo-American "model" tends to emphasize the interests of shareholders. The coordinated or multistakeholder model associated with Continental Europe and Japan also recognizes the interests of workers, managers, suppliers, customers, and the community. A related distinction is between market-oriented and network-oriented models of corporate governance.

=== Continental Europe (two-tier board system) ===
Some continental European countries, including Germany, Austria, and the Netherlands, require a two-tiered board of directors as a means of improving corporate governance. In the two-tiered board, the executive board, made up of company executives, generally runs day-to-day operations while the supervisory board, made up entirely of non-executive directors who represent shareholders and employees, hires and fires the members of the executive board, determines their compensation, and reviews major business decisions.

Germany, in particular, is known for its practice of co-determination, established under the German Codetermination Act of 1976, through which workers are granted seats on corporate boards as stakeholders, separate from those allocated to shareholder equity.

=== United States, United Kingdom ===
The so-called "Anglo-American model" of corporate governance emphasizes the interests of shareholders. It relies on a single-tiered board of directors that is normally dominated by non-executive directors elected by shareholders. Because of this, it is also known as "the unitary system". Within this system, many boards include some executives from the company (who are ex officio members of the board). Non-executive directors are expected to outnumber executive directors and hold key posts, including audit and compensation committees. In the United Kingdom, the CEO generally does not also serve as chairman of the board, whereas in the US having the dual role has been the norm, despite major misgivings regarding the effect on corporate governance. The number of US firms combining both roles is declining, however.

In the United States, corporations are directly governed by state laws, while the exchange (offering and trading) of securities in corporations (including shares) is governed by federal legislation. Many US states have adopted the Model Business Corporation Act, but the dominant state law for publicly traded corporations is Delaware General Corporation Law, which continues to be the place of incorporation for the majority of publicly traded corporations. Individual rules for corporations are based upon the corporate charter and, less authoritatively, the corporate bylaws. Shareholders cannot initiate changes in the corporate charter although they can initiate changes to the corporate bylaws.

It is sometimes colloquially stated that in the US and the UK that "the shareholders own the company." This is, however, a misconception as argued by Eccles and Youmans (2015) and Kay (2015). The American system has long been based on a belief in the potential of shareholder democracy to efficiently allocate capital.

=== Japan ===
The Japanese model of corporate governance has traditionally held a broad view that firms should account for the interests of a range of stakeholders. For instance, managers do not have a fiduciary responsibility to shareholders. This framework is rooted in the belief that a balance among stakeholder interests can lead to a superior allocation of resources for society. The Japanese model includes several key principles:

- Securing the rights and equal treatment of shareholders
- Appropriate cooperation with stakeholders (other than shareholders)
- Ensuring appropriate information disclosure and transparency
- Responsibility of the board
- Dialogue with shareholders

=== Founder centrism ===
An article published by the Australian Institute of Company Directors called "Do Boards Need to become more Entrepreneurial?" considered the need for founder centrism behaviour at board level to appropriately manage disruption.

== Regulation ==
Corporations are created as legal persons by the laws and regulations of a particular jurisdiction. These may vary in many respects between countries, but a corporation's legal person status is fundamental to all jurisdictions and is conferred by statute. This allows the entity to hold property in its own right without reference to any real person. It also results in the perpetual existence that characterizes the modern corporation. The statutory granting of corporate existence may arise from general purpose legislation (which is the general case) or from a statute to create a specific corporation. Now, the formation of business corporations in most jurisdictions requires government legislation that facilitates incorporation. This legislation is often in the form of Companies Act or Corporations Act, or similar. Country-specific regulatory devices are summarized below.

It is generally perceived that regulatory attention on the corporate governance practices of publicly listed corporations, particularly in relation to transparency and accountability, increased in many jurisdictions following the high-profile corporate scandals in 2001–2002, many of which involved accounting fraud; and then again after the 2008 financial crisis. For example, in the U.S., these included scandals surrounding Enron and MCI Inc. (formerly WorldCom). Their demise led to the enactment of the Sarbanes–Oxley Act in 2002, a U.S. federal law intended to improve corporate governance in the United States. Comparable failures in Australia (HIH, One.Tel) are linked to with the eventual passage of the CLERP 9 reforms there (2004), that similarly aimed to improve corporate governance. Similar corporate failures in other countries stimulated increased regulatory interest (e.g., Parmalat in Italy). Also see

In addition to legislation the facilitates incorporation, many jurisdictions have some major regulatory devices that impact on corporate governance. This includes statutory laws concerned with the functioning of stock or securities markets (also see Security (finance), consumer and competition (antitrust) laws, labour or employment laws, and environmental protection laws, which may also entail disclosure requirements. In addition to the statutory laws of the relevant jurisdiction, corporations are subject to common law in some countries.

In most jurisdictions, corporations also have some form of a corporate constitution that provides individual rules that govern the corporation and authorize or constrain its decision-makers. This constitution is identified by a variety of terms; in English-speaking jurisdictions, it is sometimes known as the corporate charter or articles of association (which may also be accompanied by a memorandum of association).

== Country-specific regulation ==
=== Australia ===
==== Primary legislation ====
Incorporation in Australia originated under state legislation but has been under federal legislation since 2001. Also see Australian corporate law. Other significant legislation includes:

=== Canada ===
==== Primary legislation ====
Incorporation in Canada can be done either under federal or provincial legislation. See Canadian corporate law.

=== The Netherlands ===
==== Primary legislation ====
Dutch corporate law is embedded in the ondernemingsrecht and, specifically for limited liability companies, in the vennootschapsrecht.

=== Corporate Governance Code 2016–2022 ===
In addition The Netherlands has adopted a Corporate Governance Code in 2016, which has been updated twice since. In the latest version (2022), the Executive Board of the company is held responsible for the continuity of the company and its sustainable long-term value creation. The executive board considers the impact of corporate actions on People and Planet and takes the effects on corporate stakeholders into account. In the Dutch two-tier system, the Supervisory Board monitors and supervises the executive board in this respect.

=== Poland ===
==== Primary legislation ====
Polish Corporate Law is regulated in Code of Commercial Companies. The code regulates most of the aspects of corporate governance, incl. rules of incorporation and liquidation, it defines rights, obligations and rules of operations of corporate bodies (Management Board, Supervisory Board, Shareholders Meeting).

=== UK ===
==== Primary legislation ====
The UK has a single jurisdiction for incorporation. Also see United Kingdom company law Other significant legislation includes:

==== Bribery Act 2010 ====
The UK passed the Bribery Act in 2010. This law made it illegal to bribe either government or private citizens or make facilitating payments (i.e., payment to a government official to perform their routine duties more quickly). It also required corporations to establish controls to prevent bribery.

=== US ===
==== Primary legislation ====
Incorporation in the US is under state level legislation, but there are important federal acts. In particular, see Securities Act of 1933, Securities Exchange Act of 1934, and Uniform Securities Act.

===== Sarbanes–Oxley Act =====
The Sarbanes–Oxley Act of 2002 (SOX) was enacted in the wake of a series of high-profile corporate scandals, which cost investors billions of dollars. It established a series of requirements that affect corporate governance in the US and influenced similar laws in many other countries. SOX contained many other elements, but provided for several changes that are important to corporate governance practices:

- The Public Company Accounting Oversight Board (PCAOB) be established to regulate the auditing profession, which had been self-regulated prior to the law. Auditors are responsible for reviewing the financial statements of corporations and issuing an opinion as to their reliability.
- The chief executive officer (CEO) and chief financial officer (CFO) attest to the financial statements. Prior to the law, CEOs had claimed in court they hadn't reviewed the information as part of their defense.
- Board audit committees have members that are independent and disclose whether or not at least one is a financial expert, or reasons why no such expert is on the audit committee.
- External audit firms cannot provide certain types of consulting services and must rotate their lead partner every 5 years. Further, an audit firm cannot audit a company if those in specified senior management roles worked for the auditor in the past year. Prior to the law, there was the real or perceived conflict of interest between providing an independent opinion on the accuracy and reliability of financial statements when the same firm was also providing lucrative consulting services.

==== Foreign Corrupt Practices Act ====
The U.S. passed the Foreign Corrupt Practices Act (FCPA) in 1977, with subsequent modifications. This law made it illegal to bribe government officials and required corporations to maintain adequate accounting controls. It is enforced by the U.S. Department of Justice and the Securities and Exchange Commission (SEC). Substantial civil and criminal penalties have been levied on corporations and executives convicted of bribery.

== Codes and guidelines ==
Corporate governance principles and codes have been developed in different countries and issued from stock exchanges, corporations, institutional investors, or associations (institutes) of directors and managers with the support of governments and international organizations. As a rule, compliance with these governance recommendations is not mandated by law, although the codes linked to stock exchange listing requirements may have a coercive effect.

=== Organisation for Economic Co-operation and Development principles ===
One of the most influential guidelines on corporate governance are the G20/OECD Principles of Corporate Governance, first published as the OECD Principles in 1999, revised in 2004, in 2015 when endorsed by the G20, and in 2023. The Principles are often referenced by countries developing local codes or guidelines. Building on the work of the OECD, other international organizations, private sector associations and more than 20 national corporate governance codes formed the United Nations Intergovernmental Working Group of Experts on International Standards of Accounting and Reporting (ISAR) to produce their Guidance on Good Practices in Corporate Governance Disclosure. This internationally agreed benchmark consists of more than fifty distinct disclosure items across five broad categories:

- Auditing
- Board and management structure and process
- Corporate responsibility and compliance in organization
- Financial transparency and information disclosure
- Ownership structure and exercise of control rights

The OECD Guidelines on Corporate Governance of State-Owned Enterprises complement the G20/OECD Principles of Corporate Governance, providing guidance tailored to the corporate governance challenges of state-owned enterprises.

=== Stock exchange listing standards ===
Companies listed on the New York Stock Exchange (NYSE) and other stock exchanges are required to meet certain governance standards. For example, the NYSE Listed Company Manual requires, among many other elements:

- Independent directors: "Listed companies must have a majority of independent directors ... Effective boards of directors exercise independent judgment in carrying out their responsibilities. Requiring a majority of independent directors will increase the quality of board oversight and lessen the possibility of damaging conflicts of interest." (Section 303A.01) An independent director is not part of management and has no "material financial relationship" with the company.
- Board meetings that exclude management: "To empower non-management directors to serve as a more effective check on management, the non-management directors of each listed company must meet at regularly scheduled executive sessions without management." (Section 303A.03)
- Boards organize their members into committees with specific responsibilities per defined charters. "Listed companies must have a nominating/corporate governance committee composed entirely of independent directors." This committee is responsible for nominating new members for the board of directors. Compensation and Audit Committees are also specified, with the latter subject to a variety of listing standards as well as outside regulations.

=== Other guidelines ===
The investor-led organisation International Corporate Governance Network (ICGN) was set up by individuals centred around the ten largest pension funds in the world in 1995. The aim is to promote global corporate governance standards. The network is led by investors that manage US$77 trillion, and members are located in fifty countries. ICGN has developed a suite of global guidelines ranging from shareholder rights to business ethics.

The World Business Council for Sustainable Development (WBCSD) has done work on corporate governance, particularly on accounting and reporting. In 2009, the International Finance Corporation and the UN Global Compact released a report, "Corporate Governance: the Foundation for Corporate Citizenship and Sustainable Business", linking the environmental, social and governance responsibilities of a company to its financial performance and long-term sustainability.

Most codes are largely voluntary. An issue raised in the U.S. since the 2005 Disney decision is the degree to which companies manage their governance responsibilities; in other words, do they merely try to supersede the legal threshold, or should they create governance guidelines that ascend to the level of best practice. For example, the guidelines issued by associations of directors, corporate managers and individual companies tend to be wholly voluntary, but such documents may have a wider effect by prompting other companies to adopt similar practices.

In 2021, the first ever international standard, ISO 37000, was published as guidance for good governance. The guidance places emphasis on purpose which is at the heart of all organizations, i.e. a meaningful reason to exist. Values inform both the purpose and the way the purpose is achieved.

== History ==
=== United States ===
Robert E. Wright argued in Corporation Nation (2014) that the governance of early U.S. corporations, of which over 20,000 existed by the Civil War of 1861–1865, was superior to that of corporations in the late 19th and early 20th centuries because early corporations governed themselves like "republics", replete with numerous "checks and balances" against fraud and against usurpation of power by managers or by large shareholders. (The term "robber baron" became particularly associated with US corporate figures in the Gilded Age—the late 19th century.)

In the immediate aftermath of the Wall Street crash of 1929 legal scholars such as Adolf Augustus Berle, Edwin Dodd, and Gardiner C. Means pondered on the changing role of the modern corporation in society. From the Chicago school of economics, Ronald Coase introduced the notion of transaction costs into the understanding of why firms are founded and how they continue to behave.

US economic expansion through the emergence of multinational corporations after World War II (1939–1945) saw the establishment of the managerial class. Several Harvard Business School management professors studied and wrote about the new class: Myles Mace (entrepreneurship), Alfred D. Chandler, Jr. (business history), Jay Lorsch (organizational behavior) and Elizabeth MacIver (organizational behavior). According to Lorsch and MacIver "many large corporations have dominant control over business affairs without sufficient accountability or monitoring by their board of directors".

In the 1980s, Eugene Fama and Michael Jensen established the principal–agent problem as a way of understanding corporate governance: the firm is seen as a series of contracts.

In the period from 1977 to 1997, corporate directors' duties in the U.S. expanded beyond their traditional legal responsibility of duty of loyalty to the corporation and to its shareholders.

In the first half of the 1990s, the issue of corporate governance in the U.S. received considerable press attention due to a spate of CEO dismissals (for example, at IBM, Kodak, and Honeywell) by their boards. The California Public Employees' Retirement System (CalPERS) led a wave of institutional shareholder activism (something only very rarely seen before), as a way of ensuring that corporate value would not be destroyed by the now traditionally cozy relationships between the CEO and the board of directors (for example, by the unrestrained issuance of stock options, not infrequently back-dated).

In the early 2000s, the massive bankruptcies (and criminal malfeasance) of Enron and Worldcom, as well as lesser corporate scandals (such as those involving Adelphia Communications, AOL, Arthur Andersen, Global Crossing, and Tyco) led to increased political interest in corporate governance. This was reflected in the passage of the Sarbanes–Oxley Act of 2002. Other triggers for continued interest in the corporate governance of organizations included the 2008 financial crisis and the level of CEO pay.

Some corporations have tried to burnish their ethical image by creating whistle-blower protections, such as anonymity. This varies significantly by justification, company, and sector.

=== East Asia ===
The 1997 Asian financial crisis severely affected the economies of Thailand, Indonesia, South Korea, Malaysia, and the Philippines through the exit of foreign capital after property assets collapsed. The lack of corporate governance mechanisms in these countries highlighted the weaknesses of the institutions in their economies.

In the 1990s, China established the Shanghai and Shenzhen Stock Exchanges and the China Securities Regulatory Commission (CSRC) to improve corporate governance. Despite these efforts, state ownership concentration and governance issues such as board independence and insider trading persisted.

=== Saudi Arabia ===
In November 2006 the Capital Market Authority (Saudi Arabia) (CMA) issued a corporate governance code in the Arabic language. The Kingdom of Saudi Arabia has made considerable progress with respect to the implementation of viable and culturally appropriate governance mechanisms (Al-Hussain & Johnson, 2009).

Al-Hussain, A. and Johnson, R. (2009) found a strong relationship between the efficiency of corporate governance structure and Saudi bank performance when using return on assets as a performance measure with one exception—that government and local ownership groups were not significant. However, using rate of return as a performance measure revealed a weak positive relationship between the efficiency of corporate governance structure and bank performance.

== Stakeholders ==
Key parties involved in corporate governance include stakeholders such as the board of directors, management and shareholders. External stakeholders such as creditors, auditors, customers, suppliers, government agencies, and the community at large also exert influence. The agency view of the corporation posits that the shareholder forgoes decision rights (control) and entrusts the manager to act in the shareholders' best (joint) interests. Partly as a result of this separation between the two investors and managers, corporate governance mechanisms include a system of controls intended to help align managers' incentives with those of shareholders. Agency concerns (risk) are necessarily lower for a controlling shareholder.

In private for-profit corporations, shareholders elect the board of directors to represent their interests. In the case of nonprofits, stakeholders may have some role in recommending or selecting board members, but typically the board itself decides who will serve on the board as a 'self-perpetuating' board. The degree of leadership that the board has over the organization varies; in practice at large organizations, the executive management, principally the CEO, drives major initiatives with the oversight and approval of the board.

=== Responsibilities of the board of directors ===
Former Chairman of the Board of General Motors John G. Smale wrote in 1995: "The board is responsible for the successful perpetuation of the corporation. That responsibility cannot be relegated to management." A board of directors is expected to play a key role in corporate governance. The board has responsibility for: CEO selection and succession; providing feedback to management on the organization's strategy; compensating senior executives; monitoring financial health, performance and risk; and ensuring accountability of the organization to its investors and authorities. Boards typically have several committees (e.g., Compensation, Nominating and Audit) to perform their work.

The OECD Principles of Corporate Governance (2025) describe the responsibilities of the board; some of these are summarized below:

- Board members should act on a fully informed basis, in good faith, with due diligence and care, and in the best interest of the company and the shareholders, taking into account the interests of stakeholders.
- Where board decisions may affect different shareholder groups differently, the board should treat all shareholders fairly.
- The board should apply high ethical standards.
- The board should fulfil certain key functions, including:
  - Reviewing and guiding corporate strategy, major plans of action, annual budgets and business plans; setting performance objectives; monitoring implementation and corporate performance; and overseeing major capital expenditures, acquisitions and divestitures.
  - Reviewing and assessing risk management policies and procedures.
  - Monitoring the effectiveness of the company's governance practices and making changes as needed.
  - Selecting, overseeing and monitoring the performance of key executives, and, when necessary, replacing them and overseeing succession planning.
  - Aligning key executive and board remuneration with the longer term interests of the company and its shareholders.
  - Ensuring a formal and transparent board nomination and election process.
  - Monitoring and managing potential conflicts of interest of management, board members and shareholders, including misuse of corporate assets and abuse in related party transactions.
  - Ensuring the integrity of the corporation's accounting and reporting systems for disclosure, including the independent external audit, and that appropriate control systems are in place, in compliance with the law and relevant standards.
  - Overseeing the process of disclosure and communications.
- The board should be able to exercise objective independent judgement on corporate affairs.
- In order to fulfil their responsibilities, board members should have access to accurate, relevant and timely information.
- When employee representation on the board is mandated, mechanisms should be developed to facilitate access to information and training for employee representatives, so that this representation is exercised effectively and best contributes to the enhancement of board skills, information and independence.

=== Stakeholder interests ===
All parties, not just shareholders, to corporate governance have an interest, whether direct or indirect, in the financial performance of the corporation. Directors, workers and management receive salaries, benefits and reputation, while investors expect to receive financial returns. For lenders, it is specified interest payments, while returns to equity investors arise from dividend distributions or capital gains on their stock. Customers are concerned with the certainty of the provision of goods and services of an appropriate quality; suppliers are concerned with compensation for their goods or services, and possible continued trading relationships. These parties provide value to the corporation in the form of financial, physical, human and other forms of capital. Many parties may also be concerned with corporate social performance.

A key factor in a party's decision to participate in or engage with a corporation is their confidence that the corporation will deliver the party's expected outcomes. When categories of parties (stakeholders) do not have sufficient confidence that a corporation is being controlled and directed in a manner consistent with their desired outcomes, they are less likely to engage with the corporation. When this becomes an endemic system feature, the loss of confidence and participation in markets may affect many other stakeholders, and increases the likelihood of political action. There is substantial interest in how external systems and institutions, including markets, influence corporate governance.

=== "Absentee landlords" vs. capital stewards ===
In 2016 the director of the World Pensions Council (WPC) said that "institutional asset owners now seem more eager to take to task [the] negligent CEOs" of the companies whose shares they own.

This development is part of a broader trend towards more fully exercised asset ownership—notably from the part of the boards of directors ('trustees') of large UK, Dutch, Scandinavian and Canadian pension investors:

No longer 'absentee landlords', [pension fund] trustees have started to exercise more forcefully their governance prerogatives across the boardrooms of Britain, Benelux and America: coming together through the establishment of engaged pressure groups […] to 'shift the [whole economic] system towards sustainable investment'.

This could eventually put more pressure on the CEOs of publicly listed companies, as "more than ever before, many [North American,] UK and European Union pension trustees speak enthusiastically about flexing their fiduciary muscles for the UN's Sustainable Development Goals", and other ESG-centric investment practices.

==== United Kingdom ====
In Britain, "The widespread social disenchantment that followed the [2008–2012] great recession had an impact" on all stakeholders, including pension fund board members and investment managers.

Many of the UK's largest pension funds are thus already active stewards of their assets, engaging with corporate boards and speaking up when they think it is necessary.

=== Control and ownership structures ===
Control and ownership structure refers to the types and composition of shareholders in a corporation. In some countries such as most of Continental Europe, ownership is not necessarily equivalent to control due to the existence of e.g. dual-class shares, ownership pyramids, voting coalitions, proxy votes and clauses in the articles of association that confer additional voting rights to long-term shareholders. Ownership is typically defined as the ownership of cash flow rights whereas control refers to ownership of control or voting rights. Researchers often "measure" control and ownership structures by using some observable measures of control and ownership concentration or the extent of inside control and ownership. Some features or types of control and ownership structure involving corporate groups include pyramids, cross-shareholdings, rings, and webs. German "concerns" (Konzern) are legally recognized corporate groups with complex structures. Japanese keiretsu (系列) and South Korean chaebol (which tend to be family-controlled) are corporate groups which consist of complex interlocking business relationships and shareholdings. Cross-shareholding is an essential feature of keiretsu and chaebol groups. Corporate engagement with shareholders and other stakeholders can differ substantially across different control and ownership structures.

With regard to small and medium-sized enterprises, corporate governance operates differently than in large companies. It has been found that the presence of controlling shareholders has a significant positive impact on firm value, which reinforces the importance of ownership concentration in reducing agency conflicts and enhancing oversight. Rodríguez-Valencia, L., & Lamothe Fernández, P. (2023). Managerial concentration, ownership concentration, and firm value: Evidence from Spanish SMEs. Small Business International Review, 7(1), e541. https://doi.org/10.26784/sbir.v7i1.541

==== Difference in firm size ====
In smaller companies founder‐owners often play a pivotal role in shaping corporate value systems that influence companies for years to come. In larger companies that separate ownership and control, managers and boards come to play an influential role. This is in part due to the distinction between employees and shareholders in large firms, where labour forms part of the corporate organization to which it belongs whereas shareholders, creditors and investors act outside of the organization of interest.

==== Family control ====
Family interests dominate ownership and control structures of some corporations, and it has been suggested that the oversight of family-controlled corporations are superior to corporations "controlled" by institutional investors (or with such diverse share ownership that they are controlled by management). A 2003 Business Week study said: "Forget the celebrity CEO. Look beyond Six Sigma and the latest technology fad. One of the biggest strategic advantages a company can have, it turns out, is blood lines." A 2007 study by Credit Suisse found that European companies in which "the founding family or manager retains a stake of more than 10 per cent of the company's capital enjoyed a superior performance over their respective sectoral peers", reported Financial Times. Since 1996, this superior performance amounted to 8% per year.

==== Diffuse shareholders ====
The significance of institutional investors varies substantially across countries. In developed Anglo-American countries (Australia, Canada, New Zealand, U.K., U.S.), institutional investors dominate the market for stocks in larger corporations. While the majority of the shares in the Japanese market are held by financial companies and industrial corporations, these are not institutional investors if their holdings are largely with-on group.

The largest funds of invested money or the largest investment management firm for corporations are designed to maximize the benefits of diversified investment by investing in a very large number of different corporations with sufficient liquidity. The idea is this strategy will largely eliminate individual firm financial or other risk. A consequence of this approach is that these investors have relatively little interest in the governance of a particular corporation. It is often assumed that, if institutional investors pressing for changes decide they will likely be costly because of "golden handshakes" or the effort required, they will simply sell out their investment.

=== Proxy access ===
Particularly in the United States, proxy access allows shareholders to nominate candidates which appear on the proxy statement, as opposed to restricting that power to the nominating committee. The SEC had attempted a proxy access rule for decades, and the United States Dodd–Frank Wall Street Reform and Consumer Protection Act specifically allowed the SEC to rule on this issue, however, the rule was struck down in court. Beginning in 2015, proxy access rules began to spread driven by initiatives from major institutional investors, and as of 2018, 71% of S&P 500 companies had a proxy access rule.

== Mechanisms and controls ==
Corporate governance mechanisms and controls are designed to reduce the inefficiencies that arise from moral hazard and adverse selection. There are both internal monitoring systems and external monitoring systems. Internal monitoring can be done, for example, by one (or a few) large shareholder(s) in the case of privately held companies or a firm belonging to a business group. Furthermore, the various board mechanisms provide for internal monitoring. External monitoring of managers' behavior occurs when an independent third party (e.g. the external auditor) attests the accuracy of information provided by management to investors. Stock analysts and debt holders may also conduct such external monitoring. An ideal monitoring and control system should regulate both motivation and ability, while providing incentive alignment toward corporate goals and objectives. Care should be taken that incentives are not so strong that some individuals are tempted to cross lines of ethical behavior, for example by manipulating revenue and profit figures to drive the share price of the company up.

=== Internal corporate governance controls ===
Internal corporate governance controls monitor activities and then take corrective actions to accomplish organisational goals. Examples include:

- Monitoring by the board of directors: The board of directors, with its legal authority to hire, fire and compensate top management, safeguards invested capital. Regular board meetings allow potential problems to be identified, discussed and avoided. Whilst non-executive directors are thought to be more independent, they may not always result in more effective corporate governance and may not increase performance. Different board structures are optimal for different firms. Moreover, the ability of the board to monitor the firm's executives is a function of its access to information. Executive directors possess superior knowledge of the decision-making process and therefore evaluate top management on the basis of the quality of its decisions that lead to financial performance outcomes, ex ante. It could be argued, therefore, that executive directors look beyond the financial criteria.
- Internal control procedures and internal auditors: Internal control procedures are policies implemented by an entity's board of directors, audit committee, management, and other personnel to provide reasonable assurance of the entity achieving its objectives related to reliable financial reporting, operating efficiency, and compliance with laws and regulations. Internal auditors are personnel within an organization who test the design and implementation of the entity's internal control procedures and the reliability of its financial reporting.
- Balance of power: The simplest balance of power is very common; require that the president be a different person from the treasurer. This application of separation of power is further developed in companies where separate divisions check and balance each other's actions. One group may propose company-wide administrative changes, another group review and can veto the changes, and a third group check that the interests of people (customers, shareholders, employees) outside the three groups are being met.
- Remuneration: Performance-based remuneration is designed to relate some proportion of salary to individual performance. It may be in the form of cash or non-cash payments such as shares and share options, superannuation or other benefits. Such incentive schemes, however, are reactive in the sense that they provide no mechanism for preventing mistakes or opportunistic behavior, and can elicit myopic behavior.
- Monitoring by large shareholders and/or monitoring by banks and other large creditors: Given their large investment in the firm, these stakeholders have the incentives, combined with the right degree of control and power, to monitor the management.

In publicly traded U.S. corporations, boards of directors are largely chosen by the president/CEO, and the president/CEO often takes the chair of the board position for him/herself (which makes it much more difficult for the institutional owners to "fire" him/her). The practice of the CEO also being the chair of the Board is fairly common in large American corporations.

While this practice is common in the U.S., it is relatively rare elsewhere. In the U.K., successive codes of best practice have recommended against duality.

=== External corporate governance controls ===
External corporate governance controls the external stakeholders' exercise over the organization. Examples include:

- competition
- debt covenants
- demand for and assessment of performance information (especially financial statements)
- government regulations
- managerial labour market
- media pressure
- takeovers
- proxy firms
- mergers and acquisitions

=== Financial reporting and the independent auditor ===
The board of directors has primary responsibility for the corporation's internal and external financial reporting functions. The chief executive officer and chief financial officer are crucial participants, and boards usually have a high degree of reliance on them for the integrity and supply of accounting information. They oversee the internal accounting systems, and are dependent on the corporation's accountants and internal auditors.

Current accounting rules under International Accounting Standards and U.S. GAAP allow managers some choice in determining the methods of measurement and criteria for recognition of various financial reporting elements. The potential exercise of this choice to improve apparent performance increases the information risk for users. Financial reporting fraud, including non-disclosure and deliberate falsification of values also contributes to users' information risk. To reduce this risk and to enhance the perceived integrity of financial reports, corporation financial reports must be audited by an independent external auditor who issues a report that accompanies the financial statements.

One area of concern is whether the auditing firm acts as both the independent auditor and management consultant to the firm they are auditing. This may result in a conflict of interest which places the integrity of financial reports in doubt due to client pressure to appease management. The power of the corporate client to initiate and terminate management consulting services and, more fundamentally, to select and dismiss accounting firms contradicts the concept of an independent auditor. Changes enacted in the United States in the form of the Sarbanes–Oxley Act (following numerous corporate scandals, culminating with the Enron scandal) prohibit accounting firms from providing both auditing and management consulting services. Similar provisions are in place under clause 49 of Standard Listing Agreement in India.

== Systems perspective ==
A basic comprehension of corporate positioning on the market can be found by looking at which market area or areas a corporation acts in, and which stages of the respective value chain for that market area or areas it encompasses.

A corporation may from time to time decide to alter or change its market positioning – through M&A activity for example – however it may loose some or all of its market efficiency in the process due to commercial operations depending to a large extent on its ability to account for a specific positioning on the market.

=== Systemic problems ===
- Demand for information: In order to influence the directors, the shareholders must combine with others to form a voting group which can pose a real threat of carrying resolutions or appointing directors at a general meeting.
- Monitoring costs: A barrier to shareholders using good information is the cost of processing it, especially to a small shareholder. The traditional answer to this problem is the efficient-market hypothesis (in finance, the efficient market hypothesis (EMH) asserts that financial markets are efficient), which suggests that the small shareholder will free ride on the judgments of larger professional investors.
- Supply of accounting information: Financial accounts form a crucial link in enabling providers of finance to monitor directors. Imperfections in the financial reporting process will cause imperfections in the effectiveness of corporate governance. This should, ideally, be corrected by the working of the external auditing process.

== Issues ==
=== Sustainability ===
Well-designed corporate governance policies also support the sustainability and resilience of corporations and in turn, may contribute to the sustainability and resilience of the broader economy. Investors have increasingly expanded their focus on companies' financial performance to include the financial risks and opportunities posed by broader economic, environmental and societal challenges, and companies' resilience to and management of those risks. In some jurisdictions, policy makers also focus on how companies' operations may contribute to addressing such challenges. A sound framework for corporate governance with respect to sustainability matters can help companies recognise and respond to the interests of shareholders and different stakeholders, as well as contribute to their own long-term success. Such a framework should include the disclosure of material sustainability-related information that is reliable, consistent and comparable, including related to climate change. In some cases, jurisdictions may interpret concepts of sustainability-related disclosure and materiality in terms of applicable standards articulating information that a reasonable shareholder needs in order to make investment or voting decisions.

=== Executive pay ===
Increasing attention and regulation (as under the Swiss referendum "against corporate rip-offs" of 2013) has been brought to executive pay levels since the 2008 financial crisis. Research on the relationship between firm performance and executive compensation does not identify consistent and significant relationships between executives' remuneration and firm performance. Not all firms experience the same levels of agency conflict, and external and internal monitoring devices may be more effective for some than for others. Some researchers have found that the largest CEO performance incentives came from ownership of the firm's shares, while other researchers found that the relationship between share ownership and firm performance was dependent on the level of ownership. The results suggest that increases in ownership above 20% cause management to become more entrenched, and less interested in the welfare of their shareholders.

Some argue that firm performance is positively associated with share option plans and that these plans direct managers' energies and extend their decision horizons toward the long-term, rather than the short-term, performance of the company. However, that point of view came under substantial criticism circa in the wake of various security scandals including mutual fund timing episodes and, in particular, the backdating of option grants as documented by University of Iowa academic Erik Lie and reported by James Blander and Charles Forelle of the Wall Street Journal.

Even before the negative influence on public opinion caused by the 2006 backdating scandal, use of options faced various criticisms. A particularly forceful and long running argument concerned the interaction of executive options with corporate stock repurchase programs. Numerous authorities (including U.S. Federal Reserve Board economist Weisbenner) determined options may be employed in concert with stock buybacks in a manner contrary to shareholder interests. These authors argued that, in part, corporate stock buybacks for U.S. Standard & Poor's 500 companies surged to a $500 billion annual rate in late 2006 because of the effect of options.

A combination of accounting changes and governance issues led options to become a less popular means of remuneration as 2006 progressed, and various alternative implementations of buybacks surfaced to challenge the dominance of "open market" cash buybacks as the preferred means of implementing a share repurchase plan.

=== Separation of Chief Executive Officer and Chairman of the Board roles ===
Shareholders elect a board of directors, who in turn hire a chief executive officer (CEO) to lead management. The primary responsibility of the board relates to the selection and retention of the CEO. However, in many U.S. corporations the CEO and chairman of the board roles are held by the same person. This creates an inherent conflict of interest between management and the board.

Critics of combined roles argue the two roles that should be separated to avoid the conflict of interest and more easily enable a poorly performing CEO to be replaced. Warren Buffett wrote in 2014: "In my service on the boards of nineteen public companies, however, I've seen how hard it is to replace a mediocre CEO if that person is also Chairman. (The deed usually gets done, but almost always very late.)"

Advocates argue that empirical studies do not indicate that separation of the roles improves stock market performance and that it should be up to shareholders to determine what corporate governance model is appropriate for the firm.

In 2004, 73.4% of U.S. companies had combined roles; this fell to 57.2% by May 2012. Many U.S. companies with combined roles have appointed a "Lead Director" to improve independence of the board from management. German and UK companies have generally split the roles in nearly 100% of listed companies. Empirical evidence does not indicate one model is superior to the other in terms of performance. However, one study indicated that poorly performing firms tend to remove separate CEOs more frequently than when the CEO/Chair roles are combined.

=== Shareholder apathy ===
Certain groups of shareholders may become disinterested in the corporate governance process, potentially creating a power vacuum in corporate power. Insiders, other shareholders, and stakeholders may take advantage of these situations to exercise greater influence and extract rents from the corporation.

== See also ==
- Agency cost – Costs arising from conflicts of interest between principals and their agents
- Basel II – Banking regulation framework
- Co-determination – Aspect of corporate law
  - Worker representation on corporate boards of directors – Aspect of corporate law
- Corporate finance § Corporate governance
- Corporate Law Economic Reform Program Act 2004
- Corporate social entrepreneurship – Non-specific organisational entrepreneur
- Corporate transparency – Aspect of open corporate governance
- Creative accounting – Euphemism referring to unethical accounting practices
- Earnings management – Alteration of a firm's financial reports for some private gain
- Environmental, social and corporate governance – Business framework
- Fund governance – Financial checks and balances system
- Golden parachute – Agreement providing compensation if someone is fired
- International Organization of Supreme Audit Institutions – Worldwide affiliation of governmental entities
- King Report on Corporate Governance – 1994, 2002, 2009 and 2016 South African reports
- Legal origins theory – Claims that civil law and common law shape lawmaking
- Market socialism – Economic system based on social ownership of the means of production in a market economy
- Outrage constraint
- Private benefits of control
- Risk management – Identification, evaluation and control of risks
- Social ownership – Ownership of the means of production by society
- Sociocracy – System of governance using consent-based decision-making
- Stakeholder theory – Management and ethical theory that considers multiple constituencies
