= Australian corporate law =

Corporate law in Australia

Australian corporations law has historically borrowed heavily from UK company law. Its legal structure now consists of a single, national statute, the Corporations Act 2001. The statute is administered by a single national regulatory authority, the Australian Securities and Investments Commission (ASIC).

Since provisions in the act can frequently be traced back to some pioneer legislation in the United Kingdom, reference is frequently made to judgments of courts there.

Though other forms are permitted, the main corporate forms in Australia are public and private (in Australia termed proprietary) companies, both of which predominantly have limited liability.

== History ==
Upon Federation in 1901, the Constitution of Australia granted limited powers in relation to corporations to the Australian Parliament. Each state has a residual power in relation to anything not within the Commonwealth power. The main grant of powers to the Commonwealth are as follows:

The Parliament shall, subject to this Constitution, have power to make laws for the peace, order, and good government of the Commonwealth with respect to...

51(i) trade and commerce with other countries, and among the States;"

and

51(xx) foreign corporations, and trading or financial corporations formed within the limits of the Commonwealth;

Though corporations law in Australia had historically closely followed developments in English law, it was mostly the concern of each separate state legislature, and there were significant differences in corporations legislation between the states.

Since the Second World War, it became increasingly clear that legislative differences between the states were creating unnecessary costs for companies that operated beyond one state. The states and the Commonwealth co-operated in the formation of uniform national companies code which was legislated in each jurisdiction by 1962. The difficulty with this scheme was that it did not provide for uniformity in amendment of the legislation and with changes of government and policy each state's legislation once again developed on separate lines. This attempt at a complex cross-vesting arrangement by the states, territories and Commonwealth was ruled invalid by the High Court. In Strickland v Rocla Concrete Pipes Ltd (1971) it was held that laws with a sufficient connection to the trading activities of constitutional corporations were valid.

In 1978, a second co-operative scheme was agreed to and implemented by 1982 by the Companies Act 1981 (Cth) to overcome the defects in the first scheme. All laws and amendments would be agreed to by a Ministerial Council and automatically applied in each jurisdiction. This second scheme led to the creation of the National Companies and Securities Commission (NCSC), the forerunner to the Australian Securities and Investments Commission.

While an improvement on the first scheme, the 1982 scheme still presented significant difficulties mainly due to the NCSC delegating administrative functions to state commissions but retaining control of takeovers and policy. This led to funding difficulties and inefficient corporate regulation. In New South Wales v Commonwealth (the Incorporation Case, 1990) it was confirmed that the Commonwealth corporations power is confined to making laws with respect to companies that had commenced trading and not to the formation of companies.

The Commonwealth then sought to take sole responsibility for corporations law in Australia. In 2001, the current arrangement was created, after the states referred their power in respect of corporations to the Commonwealth.

- Australian Securities Commission Act 1989, and Australian Securities and Investments Commission
- Corporate Law Economic Reform Program Act 2004.

== Company formation ==
A "corporation" is a separate legal entity created by charter, prescription or legislation. Australian law, like UK law, recognises a kind of corporation called the corporation sole. However, there are few cases of such corporations, the corporation sole is excluded from the Australian statutory definition of corporation.

Australian companies are incorporated by registration with the Australian Securities and Investments Commission (ASIC). An application for registration would state whether the company is to be a proprietary company or public company, and the type of liability of shareholders of the company, as one of:

- unlimited with share capital
- limited by shares
- limited by guarantee
- no liability, if the company's sole objects are mining or mining-related objects.

The most common form of business entity in Australia is a company limited by shares.

Proprietary companies are not allowed to raise capital on public equity markets and have no more than 50 shareholders. The 50 shareholder restriction can be overcome by structuring shareholdings as joint shareholdings. They must include "Proprietary" or "Pty" in its name (CA 2001, s 45A). Only public companies may engage in public fund raising activities and be listed on the Australian Securities Exchange (ASX). Companies incorporated outside Australia wishing to carry on business in Australia must either incorporate a wholly owned or partly owned subsidiary company in Australia, or acquire an existing company, or register a branch office in Australia.

In the absence of special situations, Australian companies can be fully foreign owned. One director needs to be resident in Australia and must have an office address in Australia. Proprietary companies are often used for private ventures or as subsidiaries of public companies, including foreign companies. Some are shell companies for other business structures such as trusts or partnerships, to limit the owners' liabilities.

If a foreign company chooses to establish a branch office in Australia, it must be registered as a foreign company under the Corporations Act. Such registration does not create a separate legal entity. It creates a public record and registration of a foreign company's presence in Australia.

Upon registration, ASIC will issue a certificate of incorporation for the company and an Australian Company Number (ACN), which must be quoted on all correspondence and invoices issued by the company. For a branch office of a foreign company, ASIC will issue an Australian Registered Body Number (ARBN), which is similar to an ABN. If the company is going to trade, it will need a Tax File Number (TFN) from the Australian Taxation Office and an Australian Business Number (ABN).

== Share capital ==
Australian companies must have a share capital. The minimum number of shareholders for both a proprietary and a public company limited by shares is one. There is no upper limit on the number of shares that can be issued. The manner in which a company deals with its share capital is strictly regulated by the Corporations Act 2001.

By default, shareholders have one vote per share, or one vote per person on a poll at a meeting. Corporations listed on the Australian Securities Exchange cannot deviate from one share, one vote rule (ASX LR 6.8). Under CA 2001 section 249D, directors must convene a meeting if members with over 5% of voting rights request it in writing, stating the resolution they wish to be put. The CA 2001 section 136(2) gives the general meeting the power to alter or amend the company constitution by a 75% vote (a special resolution).

Australia has few rules on political donations. Only if it can be found to be a breach of a director's duty (e.g. a director is a member of a political party), or would involve oppression of the minority (inherently unlikely) can anything be done as a company law matter. There is no requirement for ex ante approval of donations with political objects. The Commonwealth Electoral Act 1918 requires the disclosure of donations, which since 2006 has been over $10,000.

Australia has a system of "codetermination" or member nominated trustees in its pension, or 'superannuation' funds. Since the Occupational Superannuation Standards Act 1987, the Occupational Superannuation Standards Regulations (SR 1987 No 322) regulations 13 and 15 required that equal member nominated trustees was required, or at least one member nominee in schemes with under 200 people. The current legislation is the Superannuation Industry (Supervision) Act 1993, sections 86 to 89.

A shareholder does not have a right to receive a dividend. Once a final dividend is declared, it becomes a debt payable by the company to the shareholder from the date stipulated for payment.

== Corporate governance ==
Corporate Governance standards are not just a matter of comply and explain, and have been taken into account by the Australian courts when determining the scope of directors' duties. They would probably be similarly relevant to the UK duty of care, under CA 2006 s 174. In Australian Securities and Investments Commission v Rich, Mr Greaves was a non executive director of One.Tel Ltd, and also the chairman, chair of the board and chair of the finance and audit committee. He was a qualified accountant. Austin J held that it was a board responsibility to have functioning financial and audit committees with independent directors, as well as internal review and accounting standards.

The ASX Corporate Governance Council's Best Practice Recommendation 2.3 states the CEO and chair should be separated. The ASX CGCBPR 2.1 states there should be a majority of independent directors, and the chair should be independent. Under ASX CGCBPR 8.1, the companies should have a remuneration committee, which should be chaired by an independent director, have at least three members and a majority independent. Under ASX CGCBPR 4.2 an audit committee should have at least three members, with a majority independent, and be chaired by an independent director, not including the chairman.

=== Company constitution ===
Australia has strong rules, similar to those found across the Commonwealth, in allowing for removal of directors by a simply majority vote in an ordinary resolution. For public companies, under CA 2001 section 203D, there must be a meeting with two months' notice where the director has a right to be heard.

For private companies, known as 'proprietary companies' the ones with the suffix "Pty Ltd", which do not offer shares to the public, and have under 50 shareholders, this rule can be replaced with a different rule allowing for a simpler procedure. In Lee v Chou Wen Hsien [1984] 1 WLR 1202, the Privy Council advised that a private company was permitted to have a provision for directors to remove other directors. Removal from office does not affect a director's claim for breach of contract.

=== Officeholders ===
A company director must be a natural person and be at least 18 years of age. Directors do not need to be Australian citizens. No particular qualifications or experience is prescribed. Other legislation may impose restrictions and qualification requirements on particular types of companies, such as those holding a banking licence, operate a gambling business, etc. An undischarged bankrupt cannot be a director, but may be an employee of a company, and ASIC maintains a list of persons who have been banned from acting as a director. A person may be appointed as a nominee director by a shareholder, creditor or interest group, whether contractually or by resolution at a company meeting, and who is expected to act in the interest of the appointor.

A proprietary company must have at least one director, who may also be the company secretary and/or sole shareholder. At least one director must be resident in Australia. The office of secretary is optional, but if appointed one must reside in Australia.

A public company must have at least three directors (CA 2001, s 201H), of which at least two must be resident in Australia, and at least one secretary, who must be resident in Australia. In the event of a vacancy, a replaceable rule allows the board of directors to appoint other directors. Unlike the UK, if that happens, those new directors must be confirmed at the next general meeting. (CA 2001 s 201H(3)) This rule can be replaced, so it is possible for a company to require that shareholders make all appointments.

Directors' remuneration is determined by 'the company' (CA 2001, s 202A). This rule is a default, or 'replaceable', rule and is usually replaced. As usual, the standard is that directors pay themselves. Australia has had a non-binding say on pay since the Corporate Law Economic Reform Program Act 2004 for its shareholders. Under the Corporations Amendment (Improving Accountability on Director and Executive Remuneration) Act 2011, new sections were introduced, so that if at two consecutive meetings over 25% of shareholders vote against the directors' remuneration package, the directors have to stand for election again in 90 days.

A director who receives remuneration or other benefit from a company is treated for accounting and tax purposes as an employee of the company.

=== Directors' duties ===
Australian directors are subject to similar duties found in other jurisdictions, particularly the duty of loyalty and the duty of care. Directors have a duty to act in the best interests of the company. This is primarily identified as being for the benefit of shareholders, and surveys suggest that Australian directors, more than in other countries view their primary obligation as being to create shareholder value.

Directors have the duty to strictly avoid conflicts of interest. When directors have any interest in a transaction, i.e. they stand on both sides of a deal a company makes, they must give full disclosure under CA 2001 ss 191–193. A significant extension to the UK law, there is in addition, criminal penalties under schedule 3 of the 2001 act. In Pilmer v Duke Group Ltd (in liq) a director of Duke Holdings Ltd, and a Duke Group employee, became a director of Kia Ora, a mining business, in a reverse takeover. He failed to tell the Kia Ora board the true financial position of Duke Group, which was worse than expected. Mullighan J held this failure to disclose meant a breach of duty. So directors involved in two companies with conflicting interests must declare they have an interest, and give full disclosure on the potential harm to the company. When a director wishes to take an opportunity in which the corporation may possibly have an interest, the director must gain the fully informed consent of the board, or the opportunity will belong to the company under CA 2001 sections 182–183. There are further specific duties where members need to approve large transactions found in CA 2001 sections 207–230.

An objective standard of care was developed by the Australian courts, beginning in Daniels v Anderson where a bank let a forex trader lose money. The bank sued the auditors, Deloitte Haskins and Sells, who failed to notice, and the auditors counterclaimed that the company was negligent. The NSW Court of Appeal held by a majority that both the auditors and the company directors, whether executives or not, were liable for failing to exercise proper oversight. The Liberal government introduced the Corporate Law Economic Reform Program Act 1999, with a new section 180(2), containing a US style 'business judgment rule'.

Directors cannot be liable if they have at least taken steps to 'inform themselves about the subject matter of the judgment to the extent that they reasonably believe to be appropriate'. I am not sure whether there is a recent parallel case, but this would mean that a director could receive a report on separating the back and front offices and ignore it (as in Barings), receive a compensation report warning of grave mistakes and ignore it (as in the US Walt Disney case), or simply delegate duties down the chain of management, and ignore what happens below (as in Daniels).

At the point of insolvency CA 2001 s 588G creates the same kind of liability as is found in the UK for wrongful trading (Insolvency Act 1986 s 214). If a director is or should reasonably be aware that a company would become insolvent, and does nothing about it, the director is liable to pay compensation.

- Australian Securities and Investment Commission v Rich [2009] NSWSC 1229

=== Takeovers ===
Takeovers are regulated directly by detailed and very technical rules in chapter 6 of the Corporations Act 2001. Corporate control transactions and restructurings may also be subject to anti-monopoly, foreign investment, employment protection and special industry protection legislation.

== See also ==
- Superannuation in Australia

International:

- UK company law
- US corporate law
- Canadian company law
- German company law

== Bibliography ==
- Renard, I. A.; Santamaria, J. G. "Chapter 1". Takeovers and Reconstructions in Australia. Butterworths.
- Farrar, J. H. (2008). Corporate governance : theories, principles and practice (SJ100 FAR).
- Farrar, J. H. (2001). Corporate governance in Australia and New Zealand (KU956 F24).
- Ford, H. A. J. (1999). Ford and Austin's principles of corporation law (KD956 F69) (9th ed.).
- Tomasic, R (2002). Corporations law in Australia (SJ100 TOM).
