= Proprietary company =

Type of business entity

A proprietary company, the characteristic of which is abbreviated as "Pty", is a form of privately held company in Australia, Namibia, Botswana and South Africa that has either limited or unlimited legal liability for its shareholders. However, unlike a public company there are, depending on jurisdiction, restrictions on what it can and cannot do.

In Australia, a proprietary company is defined under section 45A(1) of the Corporations Act 2001 (Cth).

The Act puts certain restrictions on proprietary companies such as not permitting them to have more than 50 members (shareholders). Another important restriction relates to fundraising. A proprietary company must not engage in fundraising that would require a disclosure document such as a prospectus, an offer information statement, or a profile statement to be issued (sec.113(3)). The Act states in which circumstances a company must issue a prospectus when attempting to raise funds. This means that a proprietary company must not offer its shares to the public.

Section 45A of the Act also distinguishes proprietary companies as either "large proprietary" or "small proprietary". The differences here relate to issues such as operating revenue, consolidated gross assets, and the number of employed persons.

Large proprietary companies are required to appoint an auditor and lodge appropriate financial statements with the Australian Securities & Investments Commission.

== Proprietary limited or unlimited company ==
Under Australian law, a proprietary limited company (abbreviated as 'Pty Ltd') is a business structure that has at least one shareholder and up to 50, where the liability of shareholders is limited to the value of shares. Its counterparts include the public limited company (Ltd) and the Unlimited Proprietary company (Pty) with a share capital.

Under the Australian Corporations Act 2001 (Cth), a proprietary company must be either –

- Proprietary Limited (Pty Ltd) company, limited by shares, where shareholders are afforded more protection when it comes to the level of liability they face for company debts; or
- Unlimited Proprietary (Pty) company with a share capital, similar to its limited company (Ltd or Pty Ltd) counterpart, but where the members' or shareholders' liability is not limited.

The proprietary limited or unlimited company must have at least one shareholder, no more than 50 non-employee shareholders, and at least one director who must live in Australia. A secretary can be appointed (sec.204A), that must be at least 18 years of age. One person may simultaneously hold the positions of company director and secretary.

Proprietary limited companies are also classified as "large" or "small". A proprietary company is classified as small only if it meets at least two of the following criteria:

- It has assets of less than $25 million at the end of a financial year.
- It has fewer than 100 employees at the end of a financial year.
- It has a gross operating revenue of less than $50 million for the financial year.

Most large proprietary companies have to lodge audited accounts. Small proprietary companies only have to prepare audited financial statements if ordered to do so by Australian Securities & Investments Commission or members holding five percent of voting shares and, in some cases, if controlled by a foreign company.

== Company names ==
Proprietary companies have the word "Proprietary" in their name, thus Relays Proprietary Limited, abbreviated to Relays Pty Ltd or Relays P/L.

=== Other countries ===
- In Singapore, a proprietary company name would be named "Relays (Private) Limited" abbreviated to "Relays Pte Ltd".
- In Namibia and South Africa, the name of a private company ends with "(Pty) Ltd" and that of a public company ends with "Ltd".

== Company number ==
To help identify companies more uniquely and concisely, many countries have a company number which does not change if the company changes its name.

- (Australia) Australian Company Number

== See also ==
- Australian company law
- South African company law
