= Certified Sarbanes-Oxley Professional =

Certified Sarbanes-Oxley Professional (CSOXP) is a credential awarded by the governance, risk & compliance group (The GRC Group). The CSOXP credential communicates that certified professionals have the knowledge listed below:

- The key tenets of the SOX Act
- The history and impact of the SOX Act
- Industry-accepted frameworks and principles
- The role of audit committees
- Auditor independence
- Conflicts of interest and codes of conduct
- Whistleblower protection and corporate fraud
- White collar criminal penalties
- COSO ERM components (internal environment, objective setting, even identification, risk assessment, risk response, control activities, information and communication, and monitoring)
- Section 404 internal control documentation
- Entity-level and activity-level testing controls, techniques, effectiveness, and documentation
- SOX Section 404 project lifecycle management

Also, the certified professionals must have 1,200 hours of related experience (over the past three years).
