= Australian Business Number =

Unique identifier in Australia

The Australian Business Number (ABN) is a unique Budget identifier issued by the Australian Business Register (ABR) which is operated by the Australian Taxation Office (ATO). The ABN was introduced on 1 July 2000 by John Howard's Liberal government as part of a major tax reform, which included the introduction of a GST.

The law requires each entity that carries on a business in Australia has an ABN and that the ABN appear on each tax invoice and other tax related documents issued by the entity.

== Australian Business Register ==
The Australian Business Register (ABR) is maintained by the Registrar of the ABR, who is also the Commissioner of Taxation. The Registrar registers entities, issuing them with an ABN, while the Commissioner of Taxation issues the entity a tax file number.

== Entitlement to an ABN ==
The Registrar issues ABNs only to entities that are entitled to an ABN, which can be:

- an individual,
- a body corporate,
- a corporation sole,
- a body politic,
- a partnership,
- any other unincorporated association or body of persons,
- a trust, or
- a superannuation fund.

For an entity to be entitled to an ABN, it must:

- carry on an enterprise in Australia, or
- carry on an enterprise that makes supplies connected with Australia, or
- be a company registered under the Corporations Act 2001 (Cth).

Whether or not an entity is carrying on an enterprise is a question of fact and there are many circumstances where an entity will be carrying on an enterprise. Without being exhaustive, an entity will be carrying on an enterprise if it:

- is in the form of a business,
- leases property,
- is a religious institution,
- is a superannuation fund,
- is an arm of the government, or
- is a charity.

The Registrar can refuse an entity's application to be registered. Equally, the Registrar can cancel an entity's registration and thus their ABN. Each of these decisions are reviewable taxation decisions.

== Applying for an ABN ==
An entity can apply for an ABN:

- online through the Australian Business Register portal,
- using the services of a registered tax agent, or
- lodging a paper-based application with the ATO.

Before applying for an ABN the entity must have a tax file number (TFN).

== Format ==
The ABN is an 11-digit number where the first two digits are a checksum. Unlike with the tax file number (TFN), the ATO has publicised the formula for checking and creating valid ABN checksums. Also, the nature of the ABN algorithm means that any 9-digit number can be made into a valid ABN.

== Checksum Method and Verification ==
The Australian Business Number (ABN) is a unique 11 digit identifier issued to all entities registered in the Australian Business Register (ABR).

The 11 digit ABN is structured as a 9 digit identifier with two leading check digits. The leading check digits are derived using a modulus 89 (remainder after dividing by 89) calculation.

To verify an ABN:

1. Subtract 1 from the first (left-most) digit of the ABN to give a new 11 digit number
2. Multiply each of the digits in this new number by a "weighting factor" based on its position as shown in the table below
3. Sum the resulting 11 products
4. Divide the sum total by 89, noting the remainder
5. If the remainder is zero the number is a valid ABN

For example, to check if 51 824 753 556, the ABN of the Australian Taxation Office, is a valid ABN:

1. Subtract 1 from the first (left-most) digit (5) to give 41 824 753 556
2. Multiply each of the digits in 41 824 753 556 by the "weighting factor" based on its position as shown in the table below
3. Sum (Digit * weight) to give a total of 534
4. Divide 534 by 89 giving 6 with zero remainder.
5. As the remainder is zero, 51 824 753 556 is a valid ABN.

Validate ABN example
Digit	Position	Weighting	Digit * weight
4	1	10	40
1	2	1	1
8	3	3	24
2	4	5	10
4	5	7	28
7	6	9	63
5	7	11	55
3	8	13	39
5	9	15	75
5	10	17	85
6	11	19	114
		Total:	534

== See also ==
- Australian Company Number
- Taxation in Australia
- List of company registers
