= Pilmer v Duke Group Ltd (in liq) =

Judgement of the High Court of Australia

- Court: High Court of Australia
- Full case name: Pilmer v Duke Group Ltd (In Liq)
- Decided: 31 May 2001
- Citations: [2001] HCA 31, (2001) 207 CLR 165

Case history
- Prior actions: Duke Group Ltd (In Liq) v Pilmer [1999] SASC 97, (1999) 17 ACLC 1329 (20 May 1999), Full Court; Duke Group Ltd (In Liq) v Pilmer [1998] SASC 6529, (1998) 16 ACLC 567 (30 January 1998), trial
- Appealed from: Supreme Court (SA)

Court membership
- Judges sitting: McHugh, Gummow, Kirby, Hayne and Callinan JJ

Case opinions
- Decision by: McHugh, Gummow, Hayne and Callinan JJ; Kirby J concurring in part

Pilmer v Duke Group Ltd is an Australian company law case concerning the adequacy of consideration paid for shares, as well as on the questions of duty of care and fiduciary duty owed by experts retained in such matters.

== Background ==
Kia Ora Gold Corporation NL was incorporated in South Australia in September 1954 and was listed on the Australian Stock Exchange. It carried on business principally as a gold mining company in Western Australia.

Western United Limited, originally formed in 1953, had an equal partnership with Kia Ora in the Marvel Loch mine, which was sold in 1987. After 1983, it changed its focus to concentrate on the provision of financial and mining services. Each company had a shareholding in the other, and both were under common control.

In 1987, Kia Ora made a takeover bid to purchase all shares of Western United Ltd, in consideration for either:

- 4 fully paid ordinary shares of Kia Ora for every Western United share, or
- 5 fully paid ordinary shares for every two WU shares, together with $1.20 for each WU share.

This valued WU Ltd at $3.95 to $4.40 a share, based on Kia Ora's market price of $1.10 a share. WU's shares then had a market price of $2.45 a share. Kia Ora's directors instructed the Perth office of Nelson Wheeler, to do a report for its shareholders, and this valued WU Ltd at $3.22 a share, and it was reasonable to pay a premium to acquire WU Ltd. Kia Ora shareholders approved the takeover.

In 1988, Kia Ora entered into a reverse takeover for the assets of the Duke Group of companies, with Duke acquiring all the issued capital of Kia Ora. Upon completion, in July 1988 Kia Ora changed its name to The Duke Group Limited.

In July 1989 it was placed in liquidation by order of the Supreme Court of South Australia. The administrator subsequently sued Pilmer and other partners of Nelson Wheeler in all States, for breach of duty of care in contract and in tort, as well as in breach of fiduciary duty. The directors were also sued for breach of their fiduciary and statutory duty to the company by the administrator, and in cross-claim by Pilmer and his fellow partners.

Pilmer alleged that the directors breached their duty of care and fiduciary duties, in getting a report that was not reasonably accurate. Pilmer alleged the directors had a personal interest in the takeover outcome as they were substantial shareholders in WU Ltd, and this conflict of interest led to a fallacious report which wrongly stated the price was fair, as Australian Stock Exchange rules required. The Nelson Wheeler partners in offices outside Perth contended that each office constituted a separate partnership, and no national partnership existed — therefore no liability would fall on them for actions arising in the Perth office.

== The courts below ==
At trial, Mullighan J found:

- Western Union's success was based upon significant transactions it performed for Kia Ora. The activities of Kia Ora and Western Union ultimately depended on the success of the Marvel Loch mine, and its sale resulted in the creation of a large cash reserve, which was used in the takeover bid for WU.
- Nelson Wheeler Perth were negligent in the preparation of their report, and were liable both in contract and in tort, as well as having a contractual duty to act independently, but they were not liable for breach of fiduciary duty. Duke's directors were held not to be liable for contributory negligence in the matter.
- The directors were in breach of their fiduciary and statutory duties.
- Aside from three individuals, Nelson Wheeler partners in all States were ruled to be in a national partnership.
- Liability was assessed proportionately.

On appeal to the Full Court of the Supreme Court of South Australia, Doyle CJ, Duggan and Bleby JJ, found:

- Nelson Wheeler Perth were liable for breach of duty of care both in contract and in tort, but there was no contractual duty to act independently. However. Duke's directors were liable for contributory negligence, and so NWP's damages should be reduced by 35%.
- NWP were also liable for breach of fiduciary duty.
- There was no national partnership in effect for Nelson Wheeler.

== At the High Court ==
Appeal was allowed.

=== Majority ruling ===
The High Court discussed the nature of fiduciary duty, citing from jurisprudence of the Supreme Court of Canada.

The foundation and ambit of the fiduciary obligation are conceptually distinct from the foundation and ambit of contract and tort. Sometimes the doctrines may overlap in their application, but that does not destroy their conceptual and functional uniqueness. In negligence and contract the parties are taken to be independent and equal actors, concerned primarily with their own self-interest. Consequently, the law seeks a balance between enforcing obligations by awarding compensation when those obligations are breached, and preserving optimum freedom for those involved in the relationship in question. The essence of a fiduciary relationship, by contrast, is that one party exercises power on behalf of another and pledges himself or herself to act in the best interests of the other.

Australian jurisprudence in the matter, however, draws from the High Court's decision in Hospital Products Ltd v US Surgical Corporation and subsequently in Breen v Williams, and accordingly fiduciary obligations are proscriptive rather than prescriptive in nature; there is not imposed upon fiduciaries a quasi-tortious duty to act solely in the best interests of their principals. In that regard, the trial judge was correct in his interpretation of the law. In addition, it could not be shown that a conflict of interest existed with respect to NWP's dealings with Kia Ora:

83. The conflicting duty or interests must be identified. Conflict is not shown by simply pointing to the fact that there had been past dealings between the appellants and interests associated with the Kia Ora directors. The fact that dealings are completed will ordinarily demonstrate that any interest or duty associated with those dealings is at an end and no continuing duty or interest was identified here. Nor is it sufficient to say generally that there was a hope or expectation of future dealings. That will often be so. Most professional advisers would hope that the proper performance of the task at hand will lead the client to retain them again. No real or substantial possibility of conflict was demonstrated.

Although it was not a crucial point in the appeal, the High Court also held that "the actual decision in re White Star Line Ltd may be understood as turning on the fact that both parties to the transaction knew that the consideration offered and received was not worth the sum attributed to it."

=== Opinion of Kirby J ===
Kirby J agreed that the appeal should be allowed. However, he held that Breen did not exclude a fiduciary obligation:

Although Breen was an invitation to enter new territory, this case is not. It is placed squarely in the middle of the kind of circumstance in which fiduciary obligations have been upheld on countless occasions: where the obligation of loyalty to the financial interests of identifiable persons who were specially vulnerable is abused by other persons entrusted with duties permitting them to make judgments, in effect, for others which called for the selfless pursuit of the interests of others, the independent performance of their duties and (if that be not possible) a refusal to be involved.

He proceeded to summarize principles relating the nature of fiduciary obligations:

1. They are not confined to established relationships, or to exactly identical facts, as those that have given rise to them in the past.
2. It is not sufficient, to impose fiduciary obligations on an alleged wrong-doer, simply to point to the vulnerability of the person claiming to have been wronged.
3. The mere fact that a party may have remedies at law, whether in contract or tort, does not exclude the possibility that fiduciary obligations may also be imposed.
4. The greatest difficulty facing those who assert the existence of fiduciary obligations, outside the classic per se relationships, arises from the fact that the law has not formulated any precise or comprehensive definition of the criteria adopted for imposing such obligations.
5. The unifying principle of fiduciary obligations arises from the existence of a duty of loyalty that, reflecting "higher community standards or values", gives rise to a "legitimate expectation that the other party will act in the interests of the first party or at least in the joint interests of the parties and not solely self-interestedly".
6. To reduce the uncertainties that arise from the elusive "essence" of the "fiduciary principle", it is reasonable for courts to have regard to features commonly found in cases where fiduciary obligations have been upheld.
