= Outrage constraint =

In corporate governance, the outrage constraint is an upper limit on executive pay.
