= Kearney & Company =

- Industry: Audit; Management consulting
- Founder: Ed Kearney
- Headquarters: Alexandria, Virginia
- Area served: Federal government of the United States; State governments of the United States; Local government in the United States
- Key people: Ed Kearney, Chair; Brian Kearney, CEO
- Website: https://www.kearneyco.com/

Kearney & Company is a CPA firm established in 1985 and headquartered in Alexandria, Virginia. It exclusively serves the federal government of the United States.

Kearney & Co is the 'independent auditors' of the United States Department of State.

== History of the company ==
Founded in 1985, the company sold its commercial business in 2000 to concentrate exclusively on the federal market. Over the following decade, annual revenues rose from $5 million to close to $75 million, while staff numbers increased from thirty to more than four hundred. In December 2010 the company was named one of 'Washington's fastest-growing companies'. The company was also among Accounting Today's '2010 Best Accounting Firms to Work For'. In a January 2011 statement, CEO Edward F. Kearney discussed the company's approach to service quality and management. Kearney & Company sponsors the Federal Accounting Handbook, and Ed Kearney is one of the co-authors of this manual. Kearney & Company display on their corporate website the American insignia of the bald eagle and the United States Capitol.

== See also ==
- Auditor independence
