= Intergovernmental Working Group of Experts on International Standards of Accounting and Reporting =

The Intergovernmental Working Group of Experts on International Standards of Accounting and Reporting (ISAR) is hosted by the United Nations Conference on Trade and Development (UNCTAD). Created in 1982 by the United Nations Economic and Social Council (ECOSOC), its mission is to facilitate investment, development and economic stability by promoting good practices in corporate transparency and accounting.

== Annual sessions and workshops ==
The Working Group holds its annual sessions and workshops at the United Nations Office at Geneva, Switzerland, with several hundred delegates attending from more than half of the UN member states. Participants include policymakers, regulators, and representatives from academia, civil society, private industry and various national, regional and international accountancy organizations.

== Areas of work ==
ISAR is focused on a number of areas of financial and non-financial corporate reporting, including:

- Sustainability accounting and reporting
- Implementation of International Financial Reporting Standards (IFRS)
- Accounting by small and medium-sized enterprises (SMEs)
- Corporate governance disclosure
- Corporate responsibility reporting
- Environmental accounting and reporting

== ISAR Honours ==
The ISAR Honours initiative recognizes policy, institutional and capacity-building efforts of different stakeholders that encourage and assist enterprises to publish data on their contribution to the implementation of 2030 Agenda for Sustainable Development, and facilitate dissemination of good practices in this area.

== Reports and publications ==
The ISAR Group of Experts produces a number of research and voluntary guidance documents. Each year, UNCTAD publishes ISAR's latest research papers in the annual review International Accounting and Reporting Issues. The work of ISAR is freely available for download from the UNCTAD website. The research and guidance documents are also widely distributed through on-the-ground workshops and training programmes around the world.

Voluntary guidance publications include:

- (2019) Guidance on core indicators for entity reporting on contribution towards implementation of the Sustainable Development Goals
- (2008) Guidance on Corporate Responsibility Indicators in Annual Reports
- (2006) Guidance on Good Practices in Corporate Governance Disclosure
- (2003) Accounting and Financial Reporting Guidelines for Small and Medium-Sized Enterprises (SMEGA) Level 3 Guidance
