= Auditor independence =

Auditor and client must be independent

Auditor independence refers to the independence of the internal auditor or of the external auditor from parties that may have a financial interest in the business being audited. It ensures that auditors do not have any financial interest in the firms in which they are auditing.

Independence requirements are founded on 4 major standards:

- An auditor can not audit their own work
- An auditor can not participate in the role of management for their client
- Relationships that create a shared or opposing interests between client and auditor are not allowed
- An auditor is not allowed to advocate for their client.

International codes and regulations frame independence using a principles-based approach. The IESBA International Code of Ethics identifies five categories of threats to independence—self-interest, self-review, advocacy, familiarity and intimidation—and requires accountants to apply safeguards when threats are not at an acceptable level. In audits of U.S. public companies, PCAOB rules (e.g., Rule 3520) require the audit firm and certain associated persons to be independent of the audit client throughout the audit and professional engagement period, alongside SEC independence requirements.

It requires integrity and an objective approach to the audit process, and requires the auditor to carry out his or her work freely and in an objective manner.

Auditor independence is commonly referred to as the cornerstone of the auditing profession since it is the foundation of the public's trust in the accounting profession. Since 2000, a wave of high-profile accounting scandals have cast the profession into the limelight, negatively affecting the public perception of auditor independence.

== Types of independence ==
There are three main ways in which the auditor's independence can manifest itself.

- Programming independence
- Investigative independence
- Reporting independence

=== Programming independence ===
Programming independence essentially protects the auditor's ability to select the most appropriate strategy when conducting an audit. Auditors must be free to approach a piece of work in whatever manner they consider best. As a client company grows and conducts new activities, the auditor's approach will likely have to adapt to account for these. In addition, the auditing profession is a dynamic one, with new techniques constantly being developed and upgraded which the auditor may decide to use. The strategy/proposed methods which the auditors intends to implement cannot be inhibited in any way.

=== Investigative independence ===
While programming independence protects auditors’ ability to select appropriate strategies, investigative independence protects the auditor's ability to implement the strategies in whatever manner they consider necessary. Basically, auditors must have unlimited access to all company information. Any queries regarding a company's business and accounting treatment must be answered by the company. The collection of audit evidence is an essential process, and cannot be restricted in any way by the client company.

=== Reporting independence ===
Reporting independence protects the auditors’ ability to choose to reveal to the public any information they believe should be disclosed. If company directors have been misleading shareholders by falsifying accounting information, they will strive to prevent the auditors from reporting this. It is in situations like this when auditor independence is most likely to be compromised.

=== Independence within different audit firms ===
Different firms have different independence guidelines, with some being more strict than others. The types of software used to detect independence breaches or compliance also differ, with each firm preferring to have their own software.

== In different types of audit ==
Independence varies by whether the audit being conducted is internal or external.

=== Internal audits ===
Independence of the internal auditor means independence from parties whose interests might be harmed by the results of an audit. To maintain independence and neutrality, internal adjudicators should report directly to the Audit Committee and have unrestricted access to all applicable information and labor force within the association. Specific internal management issues are inadequate risk management, inadequate internal controls, and poor governance. The Charter of Audit and the reporting to an Audit Committee generally provides independence from management, the code of ethics of the company (and of the Internal Audit profession) helps give guidance on independence form suppliers, clients, third parties, etc.

=== External audits ===
Independence of the external auditor means independence from parties that have an interest in the results published in financial statements of an entity. The support from and relation to the Audit Committee of the client company, the contract and the contractual reference to public accounting standards/codes generally provides independence from management, the code of ethics of the Public Accountant profession helps give guidance on independence form suppliers, clients, and third parties.

Internal and external concerns are convoluted when nominally independent divisions of a firm provide auditing and consulting services. The Sarbanes-Oxley Act of 2002 is a legal reaction to such problems.

== Real independence and perceived independence ==
There are two important aspects to independence which must be distinguished from each other: independence in fact (real independence) and independence in appearance (perceived independence). Together, both forms are essential to achieve the goals of independence. Real independence refers to independence of the auditor, also known as independence of mind. More specifically, real independence concerns the state of mind an auditor is in, and how the auditor acts in/deals with a specific situation. An auditor who is independent 'in fact' has the ability to make independent decisions even if there is a perceived lack of independence present, or if the auditor is placed in a compromising position by company directors. A number of difficulties lie in determining whether an auditor is truly independent, since it is impossible to observe and measure a person's mental attitude and personal integrity. Similarly, an auditor's objectivity must be beyond question, but how can this be guaranteed and measurement, but appears independent too. If an auditor is in fact independent, but one or more factors suggest otherwise, this could potentially lead to the public concluding that the audit report does not represent a true and fair view. Independence in appearances also reduces the opportunity for an auditor to act otherwise than independently, which subsequently adds credibility to the audit report.

== Relationship with the client ==
An auditor earns a living from the fee he is paid. It is therefore automatic that he does not want to do anything to jeopardize this income. This reliance on clients’ fees may affect the independence of an auditor. If the auditor feels this client income is more important than their responsibilities to shareholders he may not perform the audit with the shareholders' interests in mind. The larger the fee income the more likely the auditor is to shirk his responsibilities and perform the audit without independence. This could lead to the manipulation of figures and exploitation of accounting standards. By performing the audit without independence the shareholders may get misled, as the auditor is now reliant on the directors. To encourage auditors to maintain their independence they must be protected from the director's board. If they were able to challenge statements and figures without the risk of losing their job they would be more likely to work with complete independence. Ultimately, as long as the client determines audit appointments and fees an auditor will never be able to have complete economic independence.

In most cases it is the directors that negotiate an audit contract with the auditors. This may cause problems. Audit firms on occasions quote low prices to directors to ensure repeat business, or to get new clients. By doing so the firm may not be able to perform the audit fully as they do not have enough income to pay for a thorough investigation. Cutting corners could mean the audit team would be reporting without all the evidence required which will affect the quality of the report. This would bring into question their independence.

Under what conditions an auditor is dependent on the client is an open question.

It is common for the audit firm of a company to provide extra services as well as performing the audit. Helping a company reduce its tax charges or acting as a consultant for the implementation of a new computer system, are common examples. Having this additional working relationship with the client would result in questions being asked of the independence of the audit firm. If non-audit fees are substantial in retaliation to audit fees suspicions will arise that auditing standards may be compromised. The firm would no longer be unbiased, as it would want the company to perform well so it can continue to earn the addition fee for their consultancy. This would mean the audit firm would be dependent on the directors and they would no longer be working with independence.

The AICPA defines a covered member as the following:

- “an individual on the attest engagement team.
- an individual in a position to influence the attest engagement.
- a partner, partner equivalent, or manager who provides 10 or more hours of non-attest services to the attest client within any fiscal year. Designation as covered member ends on the later of (i) the date that the firm signs the report on the financial statements for the fiscal year during which those services were provided or (ii) the date he or she no longer expects to provide 10 or more hours of non-attest services to the attest client on a recurring basis.
- a partner or partner equivalent in the office in which the lead attest engagement partner or partner equivalent primarily practices in connection with the attest engagement.
- the firm, including the firm's employee benefit plans.
- an entity whose operating, financial, or accounting policies can be controlled by any of the individuals or entities described in items a–e or two or more such individuals or entities if they act together.”

Immediate family members of covered members (spouses, dependents) must comply with the same independence rules as the covered members. There are various situations in which independence could be impaired as a result of a covered member. For example, financial interest (direct and indirect), family relationship, employment, and consulting relationships (Vermeer, 2021).

== By country ==
Issues of audit have been delegated by the U.S. Congress to the Securities and Exchange Commission (SEC). As part of the Sarbanes-Oxley act the SEC has issued Requirements Regarding Auditor Independence. Recently the SEC has followed up on cases where auditor independence is questionable

=== United States ===
Price competition is a major factor in auditor independence. Prior to the 1970s audit firms were not allowed to advertise their services and take part in bidding competitions for contracts. Competition between the accountancy firms greatly increased when these restrictions were abolished, putting pressure on the audit firms to reduce audit fees. Competitive bidding for contracts has also encouraged the reduction of auditor engagement hours. The pressure to reduce costs may compromise the quality of an audit. If a firm feels threatened by competition they may be tempted to further reduce costs to keep a client. This risks lowering the standard of the audit performed and therefore mislead shareholders.

The increased competition between the larger firms means that company image is very important. No audit firm wants to have to explain to the press the loss of a big client. This gives the directors of the large company a commanding position over its audit firm and they may look to take advantage of it. The audit team would feel pressured to satisfy the needs of the directors and in doing so would lose their independence.

==== PCAOB Requirements ====
PCAOB Auditing Standards apply to CPA firms auditing publicly traded companies. The firm and its persons must be independent throughout the entire audit engagement period. A registered public accounting firm and its employees must adhere to independence standards as prescribed in the AICPA's Code of Professional Conduct and interpretations and the Standards Nos. 2 and 3 and any interpretations of the Independence Standards Board. Conflicts of interest between an auditor and the firm being audited can create threats such as adverse threats and self-interest threats to a members compliance with the Integrity and Objectively Rule.

==== AICPA Requirements ====
AICPA requirements for auditing differ from PCAOB requirements for auditing. AICPA requirements apply to both CPA firms auditing non-public companies and public companies. However, CPA firms auditing non-public companies are not required to follow PCAOB guidelines. The AICPA does not require auditors to issue an opinion on internal control for non-public companies. However, PCAOB does require auditors to issue an opinion on internal control for public companies (AS2201).

==== Partner Rotation Policies ====
A study was conducted to analyze the effects of auditor rotation and auditor tenure on companies listed in the Indonesia Stock Exchange. Based on the results from this study, it is shown that auditor rotation has a significant impact on auditor independence (in a positive way). However, auditor tenure has a negative impact on auditor independence. There is evidence that shows the differences in the impact between short-term and long-term tenures on auditor independence. An example of the negative effects a long-term tenure has on auditor independence is the consideration to issue a going-concern opinion. For example, if an auditor has been auditing a firm for over 10 years, they may brush off a large problem in the company and issue a clean opinion because they believe that they are familiar with the company.

For CPA firms auditing publicly traded companies, the lead partner on the audit engagement has to rotate every 5 years and have a 5-year cooling-off period for audits of public firms. Secondary/other partners need 7 years with 2 cooling-off periods for audits of public firms. Additionally, the PCAOB requires CPA firms auditing publicly traded companies to indicate how long the firm has been auditing the company, also known as tenure.

Currently, there is no PCAOB requirement for companies to rotate their audit firm. However, the PCAOB has explored the possibility of making firm rotation a standard in 2011. The PCAOB wanted to see if there were any more ways to ensure auditors could maintain their independence and professional skepticism. In the end, the PCAOB did not decide to enforce mandatory audit firm rotation because there were findings that were not supportive. For example, it would not be cost-beneficial. However, former Chairman James R. Doty encouraged both supporters and non-supporters of audit firm rotation to continue to research this topic.

However, CPA firms that audit non-public companies are not required to rotate their partners. With this in mind, it is important to consider the quality of the audit. For example, auditors may become subjective if they have been auditing the same firm for a large number of years. Additionally, it is difficult for smaller CPA firms to rotate their partners if there are only a few partners.

== Possible future developments ==
=== Service limitations ===
Many have advocated that in order for an auditor to remain strictly independent they should not be allowed to provide audit clients with any other advisory services. This idea was detailed in the EC's Eighth Directive and was designed to remove conflicts of interest arising from audit companies having a high percentage of total revenue staked in the contract of one client. To date this has not been made a requirement. Both auditors and their clients have argued that the knowledge acquired during the audit process can allow other services to be provided less expensively.

=== Peer assessment ===
Peer review of accounting firms is focused on helping maintain independence within a firm. A peer review is a recurring external assessment of a firm's quality control system, sometimes referred to as monitoring. This process helps members cultivate and increase audit quality to further advance the uniformity within the profession. For auditors of non issuers, peer review is required once every three years of the firms auditing practice and accounting department. During the peer review process for a nonissuer, members are required to be convinced that the employee's on the engagement have the ability to manage the assigned services. The firm being reviewed selects an approved CPA firm to conduct their peer review.

Peer review is required once every three years for auditors of less than 100 publicly traded companies every year. The SEC portion is peer reviewed by the PCAOB and the non public portion is peer reviewed by an approved CPA firm, both every three years. For accelerated filers, firms who audit over 100 issuers every year, are required to have a peer review annually, performed by the PCAOB.

=== Audit committees ===
The recommendation for companies to form an audit committee was first made in the Cadbury Report (1992). A group of three to five non-executive directors from within the company are chosen to provide what is supposed to be a truly objective view on all aspects of the audit: from evaluation of internal control systems to recommendations on audit fee. Since the Cadbury Report, this practice has been implemented yet some still remain unconvinced of the neutrality of non-executive directors.

=== Rotating external auditors ===
Proponents argue either mandatory rotation of audit firm or mandatory rotation of engagement partners could improve auditor independence. It is argued that an incumbent auditor has less incentive to collude with their client if the firm's contract expires in the foreseeable future or that auditors are less likely to forge conflicting relationships with client personnel. Further, because current auditors will know they are soon to be replaced, they will be inclined to produce audit reports which demonstrate high standards and are an exemplar of true independence, and avoid having any shortcomings exposed by the new audit team.

However, empirical evidence is mixed. Most research suggests financial reporting quality is lower when auditor tenure is low. One possible explanation is that it is difficult and costly to obtain the client-specific knowledge required to produce a high quality audit. These costs need to be weighed against the threat of impaired independence, mentioned above. Proposals for a maximum client servicing period of five years have since been dismissed after lobbying by accounting firms and their clients, again stressing that it is vitally important that auditors familiarise themselves with client operations in order to conduct a successful audit.

Recent research suggests the relation between partner tenure and audit quality might be more effective for small audit firms, but that five years might be too short a period. There is evidence that the relation between audit partner tenure and audit quality is hyperbolic, with perceived audit quality reduced at the time of rotation but then improving for several years, only to deteriorate again when the audit partner has been incumbent for a fairly long time. This is based on an Australian study, where mandatory audit partner rotation was introduced in 2004 by the CLERP 9 legislation.

The International Federation of Accountants recommends partner rotation but not rotation of firms. The IFAC states in its International Standard on Quality Control (ISQC1 of 15/12/09) that "The IESBA Code (International Ethics Standards Board for Accountants) recognizes that the familiarity threat is particularly relevant in the context of financial statement audits of listed entities. For these audits, the IESBA Code requires the rotation of the key audit partner after a pre-defined period, normally no more than seven years, and provides related standards and guidance. National requirements may establish shorter rotation periods"

In the area of Government Auditing, in its ISSAI 1000 standard (art.66) the INTOSAI also recommends partner rotation: "ISQC 1 requires engagement partner rotation for listed entities after a predefined period. In the public sector, this requirement may be applied to significant public interest entities. However, legislation establishing the appointments and terms of office of the Auditor General may make rotation impractical. Supreme Audit Institutions may establish policies and procedures to promote compliance with the spirit of this requirement".

In the United States, audit partner rotation is recommended in Title II Section 203 Sarbanes Oxley 116 Stat 773 (Audit Partner Rotation) (Audit Partner Rotation) of the Sarbanes–Oxley Act.

The European Commission has issued on 16/5/02 a recommendation: "Statutory Auditors’ Independence in the EU, A Set of Fundamental Principles". The recommendation only requires partner rotation on listed clients after seven years. It differs in some respects from most national/international requirements, namely:• it allows a return after two years • it applies to ‘public interest clients’, not just listed clients • in a group context, extends to key audit partners other than the audit engagement partner. No countries within the EU, with the exception of Italy, currently have a system of mandatory audit firm rotation.

In the United Kingdom, the Auditing Practices Board (FRC) has issued a revised Ethical Standard 3: Long Association with the Audit Engagement (applies on 15 December 2009). It can be summarised as follows: Audit engagement partner - maximum rotation period remains at five years, with a minimum of five years not involved in the audit afterwards. However, flexibility of up to an additional two years is permitted.

== See also ==
- Kearney & Company - US Department of State Auditor which exclusively serves the Federal Government of the United States
