= Australian Company Number =

Unique identifier for companies registered in Australia

An Australian Company Number (usually shortened to ACN) is a unique identifier required by every company registered under Australia’s Corporations Act 2001 (Cth). The ACN is a nine-digit number issued by the Australian Securities & Investments Commission (ASIC) to every Australian company. The number is usually printed in three groups of three digits, and preceded by the letters ACN must be quoted on all correspondence and invoices issued by the company.

A company may also be required to have a Tax File Number (TFN) and an Australian Business Number (ABN). If a company has an ABN, it may use the ABN in place of the ACN on documents, preceded by the letters ABN. A similar nine-digit Australian Registered Body Number (ARBN) is used for non-company entities such as registerable Australian bodies, and for foreign companies.

== History ==
The Australian Company Number (ACN) was adopted in Australia on 1 July 2000, as one of the complementary measures when the Goods and Services Tax (GST) was introduced. All companies registered at the time were issued with an ACN by ASIC. On registration of a company under Australia's Corporations Act 2001, it is issued with an ACN.

Companies are required to display their ACN on the common seal (if any) and every other seal of the company (if any); every public document issued, signed or published by, or on behalf of, the company; every eligible negotiable instrument issued, signed or published by, or on behalf of, the company; and all documents required to be lodged with ASIC.

An ACN is not required on (at least): packaging and labelling, including envelopes and transport documents; advertisements which do not make a specific offer which is capable of being accepted (such as advertisements which only promote the company and its goods or services in general); credit cards and credit card vouchers; machine-generated receipts, including cash-register receipts; business cards and 'with compliments' slips; and items which are not documents (e.g., vehicles, television advertisements).

A company's ACN does not change even if the company changes its name or is deregistered.

== Relationship to ABN ==
Other measures introduced with the introduction of the GST included the Australian Business Number (ABN), removal of wholesale sales tax exemptions and changes to the FBT and changes to the treatment of trusts and charities. The last nine digits of a company's ABN usually comprises its ACN. The ABN is required when a person, trust or company is registered with the Australian Business Register (ABR) and conducts a business. The ABN facilitates and streamlines many Australian business-to-government and government-to-business processes, such as Australian Tax Office transactions involving the collection and remittance of GST.

If a company has an ABN, it may use the ABN in place of the ACN on documents, preceded by the letters ABN.

== Examples ==
- ACN 000 000 019, 007 249 989, 005 749 986
- ABN 53 004 085 616

== Format of ACNs and ABNs ==
The ACN consists of nine digits and is generated using an algorithm with the last digit being a check digit allowing the number to be verified.

In the case of the algorithm for the ABN, the ABN consists of 11 digits, the first two of which are check digits.) The last 9 digits of an ABN do not always comply with the ASIC ACN algorithm, for example, the ABN of the Australian Taxation Office is 51 824 753 556.

== Purpose of unique identifiers ==
Prior to the introduction of the nine-digit ACN, filings with ASIC were based on the company name, which might vary from one to 80 characters. This was found to be an inefficient system, which lead to problems, particularly if two company names differed in one of the middle letters, for example: Strudle Pty Ltd and Stradle Pty Ltd.

Unique identifiers, like the ACN, were introduced to reduce fraud and mistakes by clearly differentiating companies and subsidiaries having similar names, since companies with similar names will tend to have different ACNs.

If a company changes its name for any reason, including a phoenix company, the ACN remains the same.
