= Reviewable taxation decisions =

The decisions of by Australia's Commissioner of Taxation broadly fall into two categories: reviewable and non-reviewable. Reviewable decisions may be objected against first through an administrative process.

== Process ==
A taxpayer objects to a decision and this is first reviewed by an officer of the Australian Taxation Office. The objection is either allowed, in which case the taxpayer has generally won, or it is disallowed, in which case the taxpayer can object to the disallowance. If the taxpayer objects to a disallowance, the same process takes place but with a member of the Administrative Appeals Tribunal instead of a taxation officer. Following a disallowance at the Administrative Appeals Tribunal, the taxpayer can then object to the Federal Court of Australia.
