= Corporate Law Economic Reform Program Act 2004 =

Corporate Law Economic Reform Program (Audit Reform & Corporate Disclosure) Act 2004, commonly called CLERP 9, modified the Corporations Act 2001 (Commonwealth) which governs corporate law in Australia. It was enacted in July 2004.

The changes were based on the reform proposals contained in the CLERP 9 discussion paper, Corporation disclosure - strengthening the financial reporting framework, which was released by the Australian government in September 2002. The 2004 amendments also enacted some reforms flowing from the recommendations in the Report of the HIH Insurance Royal Commission released in April 2003.

The important reforms to the Corporations Act included:

- changes to continuous disclosure offence provisions, including giving ASIC the power to issue infringement notices.
- changes to financial reporting, including requiring the CEO and CFO sign-off to the board, and Management Discussion & Analysis (MD&A) disclosure in the Annual Report.
- the introduction of a non-binding vote on remuneration reports and expanded executive remuneration
- new provisions pertaining to auditor independence, and amendments affecting the audit function and audit oversight.
- licensing obligations for financial services licensees to manage conflicts of interest and address analysts independence.
- amendments to the fundraising provisions in Chapters 6D and 7 of the Corporations Act.

The CLERP 9 changes were intended to improve investor confidence in relation to listed corporations and their financial reports. The evidence regarding their effectiveness in this regard remains mixed. There is some evidence that changes affecting the board of directors were more important to small shareholders than large shareholders. The costs and benefits of changes affecting auditors remain more contentious.
