= Corporations Act 2001 =

Act of the Parliament of Australia

Parliament of Australia
- Long title: An Act to make provision in relation to corporations, securities, the futures industry and financial products and services, and for other purposes
- Citation: No. 50 of 2001 or No. 50 of 2001 as amended
- Territorial extent: States and territories of Australia
- Royal assent: 28 June 2001
- Status: Amended

The Corporations Act 2001 is an Act of the Parliament of Australia, which sets out the laws dealing with business entities in Australia. The company is the Act's primary focus, but other entities, such as partnerships and managed investment schemes, are also regulated. The Act is the foundational basis of Australian corporate law, with every Australian state having adopted the Act as required by the Australian Constitution.

The Act is the principal legislation regulating companies in Australia. It regulates matters such as the formation and operation of companies (in conjunction with a constitution that may be adopted by a company), duties of officers, takeovers and fundraising.

== Background ==
=== Constitutional basis ===
Australian corporate law was the subject of a successful legal challenge in the High Court of Australia in New South Wales v Commonwealth (1990) ('The Corporations Act Case'). In that case, the Commonwealth was found to have insufficient power to legislate in relation to the formation of companies. Section 51(xx) of the Australian Constitution was found to provide sufficient power for legislation applicable only to foreign corporations and corporations already formed within the Commonwealth. This decision led to the creation of a co-operative scheme, involving a referral of power from the Australian states.

Under the Corporations Agreement between the states and the Commonwealth, all changes to the Act must be referred to the Ministerial Council for Corporations (MINCO) for approval. The co-operative scheme has come under pressure in recent times as the Commonwealth Government has sought to rely on the corporations power to legislate for its industrial relations reform agenda. This has led to some Labor states threatening to withdraw from the Corporations Agreement.

== The Act ==
The Act is published in five volumes covering a total of ten chapters. The chapters have multiple parts, and within each part there may be multiple divisions. Each chapter contains a collection of sections.

=== Volume 1 ===
==== Chapters 1–2J ====
- Chapter 1—Introductory
- Chapter 2A—Registering a company
- Chapter 2B—Basic features of a company
- Chapter 2C—Registers
- Chapter 2D—Officers and employees
- Chapter 2E—Related party transactions
- Chapter 2F—Members’ rights and remedies
- Chapter 2G—Meetings
- Chapter 2H—Shares
- Chapter 2J—Transactions affecting share capital

=== Volume 2 ===
==== Chapters 2L–5B ====
- Chapter 2L—Debentures
- Chapter 2M—Financial reports and audit
- Chapter 2N—Updating ASIC information about companies and registered schemes
- Chapter 2P—Lodgments with ASIC
- Chapter 5—External administration
- Chapter 5A—Deregistration, and transfer of registration, of companies
- Chapter 5B—Bodies corporate registered as companies, and registrable bodies

=== Volume 3 ===
==== Chapters 5C–6D ====
- Chapter 5C—Managed investment schemes
- Chapter 6—Takeovers
- Chapter 6A—Compulsory acquisitions and buy‑outs
- Chapter 6B—Rights and liabilities in relation to Chapter 6 and 6A matters
- Chapter 6C—Information about ownership of listed companies and managed investment schemes
- Chapter 6CA—Continuous disclosure
- Chapter 6D—Fundraising

=== Volume 4 ===
==== Chapter 7 ====
- Chapter 7—Financial services and markets
  - Part 7.10—Market misconduct and other prohibited conduct relating to financial products and financial services
    - 1041A Market manipulation

=== Schedules 3 and 4 ===
- Schedule 3—Penalties
- Schedule 4—Transfer of financial institutions and friendly societies

== Amendments ==
The Corporate Law Economic Reform Program Act 2004 simplified the statute, which, at 3,354 pages, dwarfs those of other nations such as Sweden, whose corporations statute is less than 200 pages long.

== See also ==
- Income Tax Assessment Act 1936
- Income Tax Assessment Act 1997
- Australian Takeovers Panel
