= List of music venues in South America =

This is a list of music venues in South America. Venues with a capacity of 1,000 or higher are included.

== List ==
=== Argentina ===
Opened	Venue	City	Capacity
May 25, 1872	Opera Allianz	Buenos Aires	1,852
July 8, 1937	Teatro Gran Rex	Buenos Aires	3,350
June 1978	Estadio Obras Sanitarias	Buenos Aires	4,700
February 6, 1932	Estadio Luna Park	Buenos Aires	8,400
2006	Microestadio Malvinas Argentinas	Buenos Aires	9,000
Unknown	Estadio G.E.B.A.	Buenos Aires	12,133
October 31, 2015 (reopened March 15, 2025)	Live Arena	Buenos Aires	13,500
November 1, 2019	Movistar Arena	Buenos Aires	15,000
October 6, 1920	Club Ciudad	Buenos Aires	30,000
October 27, 1928	Campo Argentino de Polo	Buenos Aires	30,000
August 17, 1924	Estadio Tomás Adolfo Ducó	Buenos Aires	48,314
April 22, 1951	José Amalfitani Stadium	Buenos Aires	60,000
May 25, 1938	Estadio Monumental	Buenos Aires	86,049
October 16, 2009	Quality Espacio	Córdoba	3,500
2018	Plaza de la Musica	Córdoba	6,100
October 16, 2009	Quality Arena	Córdoba	8,000
May 16, 1978	Estadio Mario Alberto Kempes	Córdoba	57,000
1987	Anfiteatro Cocomarola	Corrientes	12,500
1995	Polideportivo Islas Malvinas	Mar De Plata	8,000
August 21, 1995	Estadio Ruca Che	Neuque	8,000
June 7, 2003	Estadio Único Diego Armando Maradona	La Plata	53,000
2007	Salón Metropolitano	Rosario	10,000
January 5, 2001	Estadio Padre Ernesto Martearena	Salta	20,000
1946	Estadio de Central Cordoba de Santiago del Estero	San Miguel de Tucumán	14,000
December 8, 1935	Hipódromo de San Isidro	San Isidro	100,000
Unknown	Anfiteatro Villa Maria	Villa María	12,000
July 14, 2011	Tecnópolis Arena	Villa Martelli	12,000

=== Bolivia ===
Opened	Venue	City	Capacity
1977	Estadio Hernando Siles	La Paz	45,000
1988	Teatro Al Aire Libre	La Paz	10,000
1938	Estadio Félix Capriles	Cochabamba	40,000
1940	Estadio Ramón Tahuichi Aguilera	Santa Cruz De La Sierra	38,000
1987	Estadio Real Santa Cruz	Santa Cruz De La Sierra	25,000
2014	Sonilum Arena	Santa Cruz De La Sierra	12,000
1920	Teatro Gran Mariscal Sucre	Sucre	5,000

=== Brazil ===
Opened	Venue	City	Capacity
Bahia (BA)
1967	Teatro Castro Alves	Salvador	5,000
April 7, 2013	Arena Fonte Nova	Salvador	55,000
Rio Grande do Sul (RS)
May 25, 1997	Teatro FIERGS	Porto Alegre	1,757
October 18, 1983	Bar Opinião	Porto Alegre	2,000
May 2006	KTO Arena	Porto Alegre	5,500
November 4, 1973	Gigantinho	Porto Alegre	14,586
March 26, 2026	Fly 51	Porto Alegre	15,000
November 7, 1930	Estacionamento da FIERGS	Porto Alegre	25,000
April 6, 1969	Estádio Beira-Rio	Porto Alegre	51,300
December 8, 2012	Arena do Grêmio	Porto Alegre	55,662
May 30, 2000	Anfiteatro Pôr do Sol	Porto Alegre	70,000
Rio de Janeiro (RJ)
	Teatro Riachuelo	Rio de Janeiro	1,500
1982	Circo Voador	Rio de Janeiro	2,200
November 10, 2006	Vivo Rio	Rio de Janeiro	4,000
1999	Fundição Progresso	Rio de Janeiro	5,000
1994	Qualistage	Rio de Janeiro	12,000
July 2007	Farmasi Arena	Rio de Janeiro	18,768
1983	Praça da Apoteose	Rio de Janeiro	30,000
2007	Estádio Olímpico Nilton Santos	Rio de Janeiro	70,000
June 16, 1950	Maracanã Stadium	Rio de Janeiro	78,838
2011	Parque dos Atletas	Rio de Janeiro	80,000
c. 1900s	Copacabana Beach	Rio de Janeiro	~3,500,000
Paraná (PR)
1900	Teatro Guaíra	Curitiba	3,000
2008	Expotrade Arena	Curitiba	20,000
1990	Pedreira Paulo Leminski	Curitiba	20,000
January 23, 1947	Estádio Vila Capanema	Curitiba	20,000
June 24, 1999	Arena da Baixada	Curitiba	42,372
São Paulo (SP)
1952	Cine Joia	São Paulo	1,200
June 16, 1972	Auditório Celso Furtado	São Paulo	2,502
1963	Ginásio do Pacaembu	São Paulo	3,000
April 2004	Tokio Marine Hall	São Paulo	4,000
September 1999 (reopened May 2022)	Vibra São Paulo	São Paulo	7,000
2002	Espaço Unimed	São Paulo	8,400
2025	Suhai Music Hall	São Paulo	9,000
January 25, 1957	Ginásio do Ibirapuera	São Paulo	11,000
January 25, 1941	São Paulo Jockey Club	São Paulo	25,784
April 27, 1940	Mercado Livre Arena	São Paulo	40,199
2014	Nubank Parque	São Paulo	55,000
1940	Autódromo de Interlagos	São Paulo	60,000
October 2, 1960	Morumbi Stadium	São Paulo	67,052
Minas Gerais (MG)
1932	Cine Theatro Brasil Vallourec	Belo Horizonte	1,000
1952	Juscelino Kubitschek Arena	Belo Horizonte	5,000
June 25, 2003	Arena Hall	Belo Horizonte	5,500
1980	Mineirinho	Belo Horizonte	25,000
September 5, 1965	Mineirão	Belo Horizonte	58,170
2007	Arena Sabiazinho	Uberlândia	8,000
Goiás (GO)
2002	Goiânia Arena	Goiânia	15,000
Federal District (DF)
April 30, 2014	NET Live Brasília	Brasília	5,000
1973	Nilson Nelson Gymnasium	Brasília	16,000
March 10, 1974	Mané Garrincha Stadium	Brasília	72,780
Espírito Santo (ES)
1980s	Arena Vitória	Vitória	6,000
Unknown	Praça do Papa	Vitória	Unknown
Unknown	Ilha Shows	Vitória	2,700
2015	Área de Eventos do Shopping Vila Velha	Vila Velha	20,000
September 7, 1983	Estádio Kléber Andrade	Cariacica	33,000
Pernambuco (PE)
November 12, 1970	Ginásio de Esportes Geraldo Magalhães	Recife	15,000
1972	Estádio do Arruda	Recife	60,044
2001	Classic Hall	Olinda	11,400
Amazonas (AM)
	Teatro Manauara	Manaus	1,600
2006	Amadeu Teixeira Arena	Manaus	11,800
1994	Manaus Convention Center	Manaus	100,000
Alagoas (AL)
Unknown	Teatro Gustavo Leite	Maceió	1,251
Unknown	Ginásio do SESI	Maceió	8,864
Ceará (CE)
November 11, 1973	Castelão	Fortaleza	67,037
Unknown	Marina Park Hotel	Fortaleza	32,000
June 30, 2012	Centro de Eventos do Ceará	Fortaleza	30,000
2015	Ginásio Olímpico	Fortaleza	21,000
Santa Catarina (SC)
February 9, 1996	Parque do Planeta Atlântida	Florianópolis	~50,000

=== Chile ===
Opened	Venue	City	Capacity
June 19, 2017	Gran Arena Monticello	Santiago	4,000
1936	Teatro Caupolicán	Santiago	4,500
1969	Estadio Víctor Jara	Santiago	6,508
April 15, 2006	Santander Arena	Santiago	16,420
1986	Estadio Bicentenario de La Florida	Santiago	25,000
December 3, 1938	Estadio Nacional Julio Martínez Prádanos	Santiago	78,000
1873	O'Higgins Park	Santiago	100,000
2011	Parque Cerrillos	Santiago	115,000
September 16, 1962	Estadio Municipal Alcaldesa Ester Roa Rebolledo	Concepción	33,000
1963	Quinta Vergara Amphitheater	Viña del Mar	20,000
September 8, 1929	Estadio Sausalito	Viña del Mar	23,423
January 7, 1970	Estadio Bicentenario Francisco Sánchez Rumoroso	Coquimbo	18,750
October 8, 1964	Estadio Regional de Antofagasta	Antofagasta	21,178
1975 (reopened 1989)	Estadio Monumental David Arellano	Macul	47,347

=== Colombia ===
Opened	Venue	City	Capacity
2010	Teatro Royal Center	Bogotá	4,500
1993	Palacio de los Deportes	Bogotá	5,000
1973	Movistar Arena Bogotá	Bogotá	14,000
1979	Parque Simón Bolívar	Bogotá	100,000
Unknown	Parque Deportivo 222	Bogotá	18,796
August 10, 1938	Estadio El Campín	Bogotá	39,512
August 15, 2022	Coliseo Medplus	Bogotá	20,000
May 27, 2016	Chamorro City Hall	Bogotá	6,500
August 24, 2025	Vive Claro	Bogotá	40,000
1971	Coliseo El Pueblo	Cali	18,000
2007	Centro de Eventos del Pacifico	Cali	11,000
July 20, 1937	Estadio Olímpico Pascual Guerrero	Cali	33,130
1955	Coliseo Iván de Bedout	Medellín	6,000
1975	Plaza Mayor	Medellín	3,000
1945	Plaza de Toros La Macarena	Medellín	15,000
March 19, 1953	Estadio Atanasio Girardot	Medellín	45,000
1958	Estadio Jaime Morón León	Cartagena	43,000
1986	Estadio Metropolitano Roberto Meléndez	Barranquilla	46,692
May 11, 1971	Estadio Hernán Ramírez Villegas	Pereira	30,297

=== Curaçao ===
Opened	Venue	City	Capacity
Unknown	Capital Ç	Willemstad	4,500

=== Ecuador ===
Opened	Venue	City	Capacity
November 25, 1951	Estadio Olímpico Atahualpa	Quito	35,742
Summer 1992	Coliseo General Rumiñahui	Quito	16,750
Unknown	Agora Casa de la Cultura	Quito	5,500
1945	Estadio Alejandro Serrano Aguilar	Cuenca	22,000
May 30, 1963	Coliseo Voltaire Paladines Polo	Guayaquil	11,189
1959	Estadio Modelo Alberto Spencer	Guayaquil	42,000
1970	Estadio Reales Tamarindos	Portoviejo	21,000

=== Paraguay ===
Opened	Venue	City	Capacity
September 18, 1954	Jockey Club	Asunción	80,000
May 24, 1970	Estadio ueno La Nueva Olla	Asunción	51,237
1917	Estadio Defensores del Chaco	Asunción	40,759
1965	Estadio Osvaldo Domínguez Dibb	Asunción	25,000

=== Peru ===
Opened	Venue	City	Capacity
July 2, 2000	Estadio Monumental	Lima	84,000
October 27, 1952	Estadio Nacional	Lima	45,000
May 13, 1951	Estadio Universidad San Marcos	Lima	43,000
February 14, 1946	Coliseo Amauta	Lima	20,000
1989	Coliseo Eduardo Dibos	Lima	6,136
April 4, 1946	Jockey Club Parcela H	Lima	25,000
1999	Anfiteatro Nicomedes Santa Cruz	Lima	4,500
2022	Arena Perú	Lima	15,000
October 23, 2021	Arena 1	Lima	23,900
1980s	Coliseo Cerrado	Cusco	13,000
October 12, 1946	Estadio Mansiche	Trujillo	23,214

=== Trinidad and Tobago ===
Opened	Venue	City	Capacity
1817	Queen's Park Savannah	Port of Spain	Unknown
1896	Queen's Park Oval	Port of Spain	25,000
1980	Hasely Crawford Stadium	Port of Spain	23,000

=== Uruguay ===
Opened	Venue	City	Capacity
July 18, 1930	Estadio Centenario	Montevideo	65,235
May 25, 1900	Estadio Gran Parque Central	Montevideo	34,000
November 12, 2018	Antel Arena	Montevideo	15,000
1938	Velódromo Municipal	Montevideo	15,000
1984	Estadio Charrúa	Montevideo	14,000
1955	Palacio Contador Gastón Guelfi	Montevideo	5,400
1944	Teatro de Verano	Montevideo	4,218
1856	Solís Theatre	Montevideo	1,200
December 15, 2016	Landia Centro de Espectáculos	Ciudad de la Costa	4,500
1909	Real de San Carlos	Colonia del Sacramento	4,500
1994	Estadio Domingo Burgueño	Maldonado	22,000

=== Venezuela ===
Opened	Venue	City	Capacity
December 5, 1951	Estadio Olímpico de la UCV	Caracas	24,000
1970	Estadio de Fútbol de la Universidad Simón Bolívar	Caracas	15,000
March 26, 1974	Poliedro de Caracas	Caracas	13,000
Unknown	Terraza del C.C.C.T.	Caracas	5,000
Unknown	Palacio de Eventos de Venezuela	Maracaibo	7,000
March 8, 1991	Forum de Valencia	Valencia	10,150
2001	Estadio Misael Delgado	Valencia	10,400

== Defunct ==
Years active	Venue	City	Capacity
Argentina
2002-2020	Orfeo Superdomo	Córdoba	14,000
Brazil
2005-2017	Siará Hall	Fortaleza	14,000

== Gallery ==
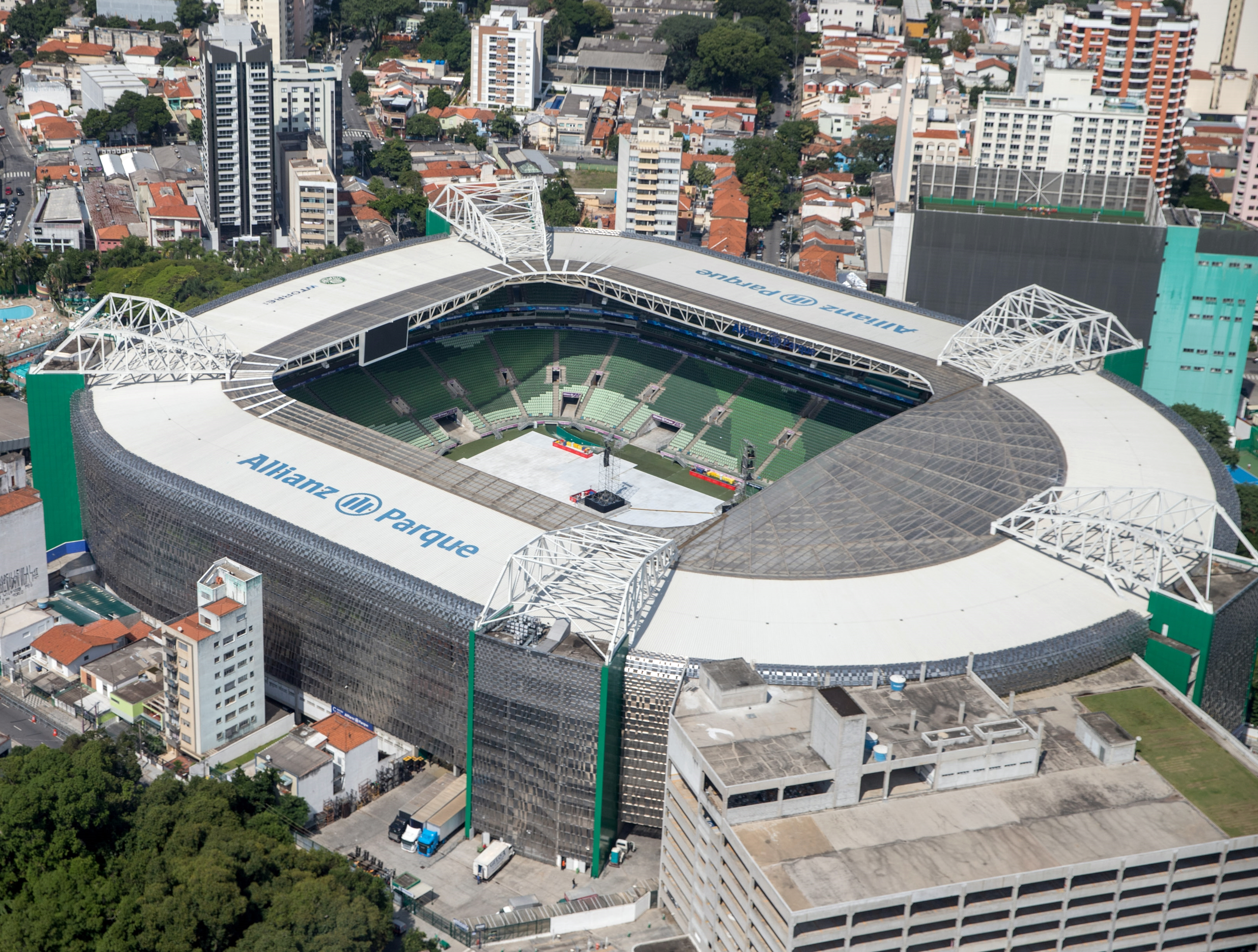
Allianz Parque

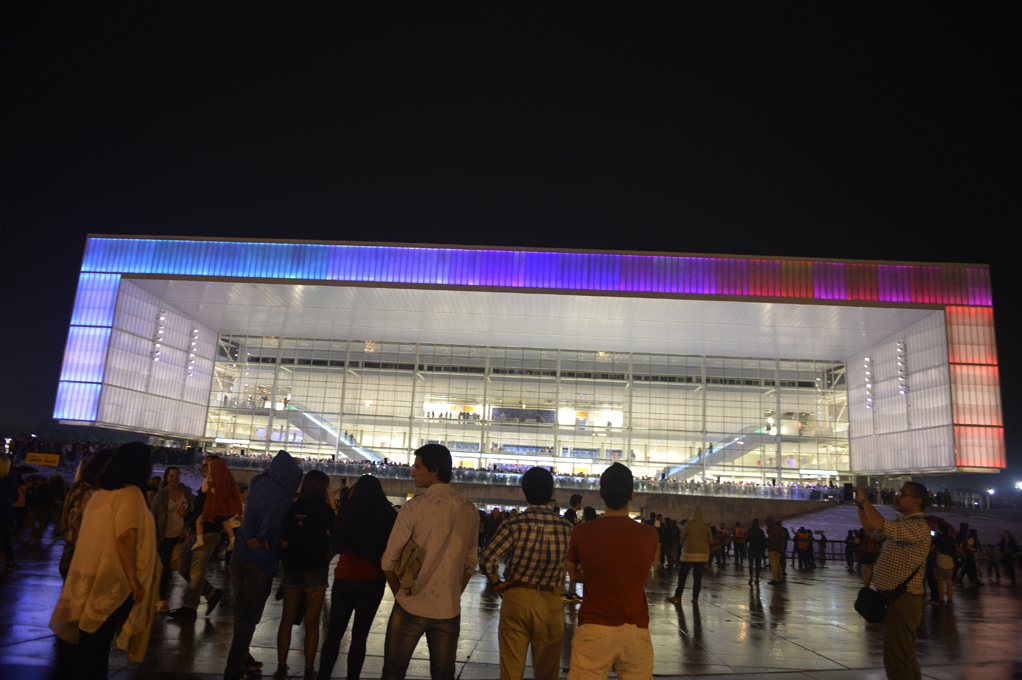
Antel Arena

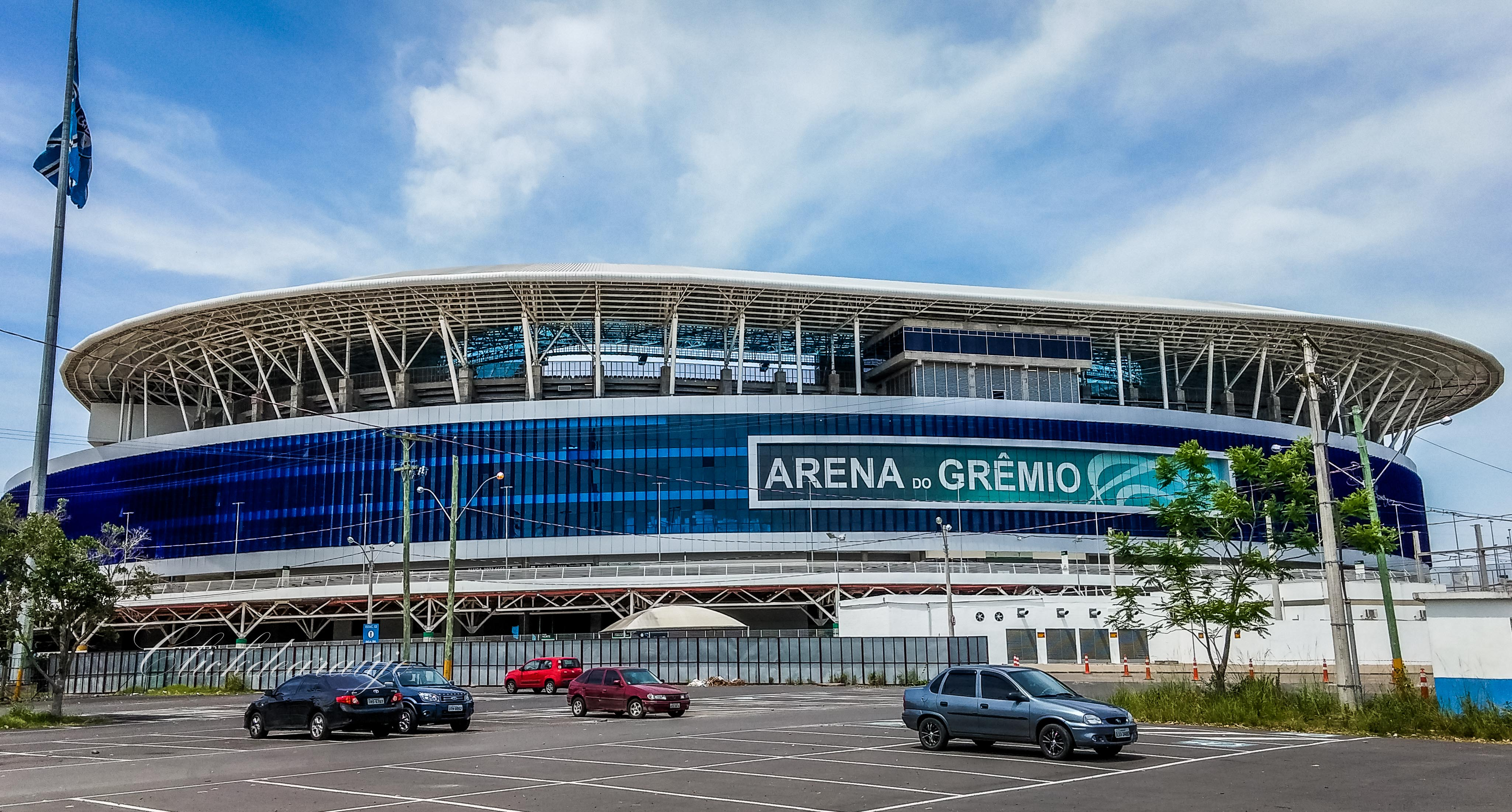
Arena do Grêmio

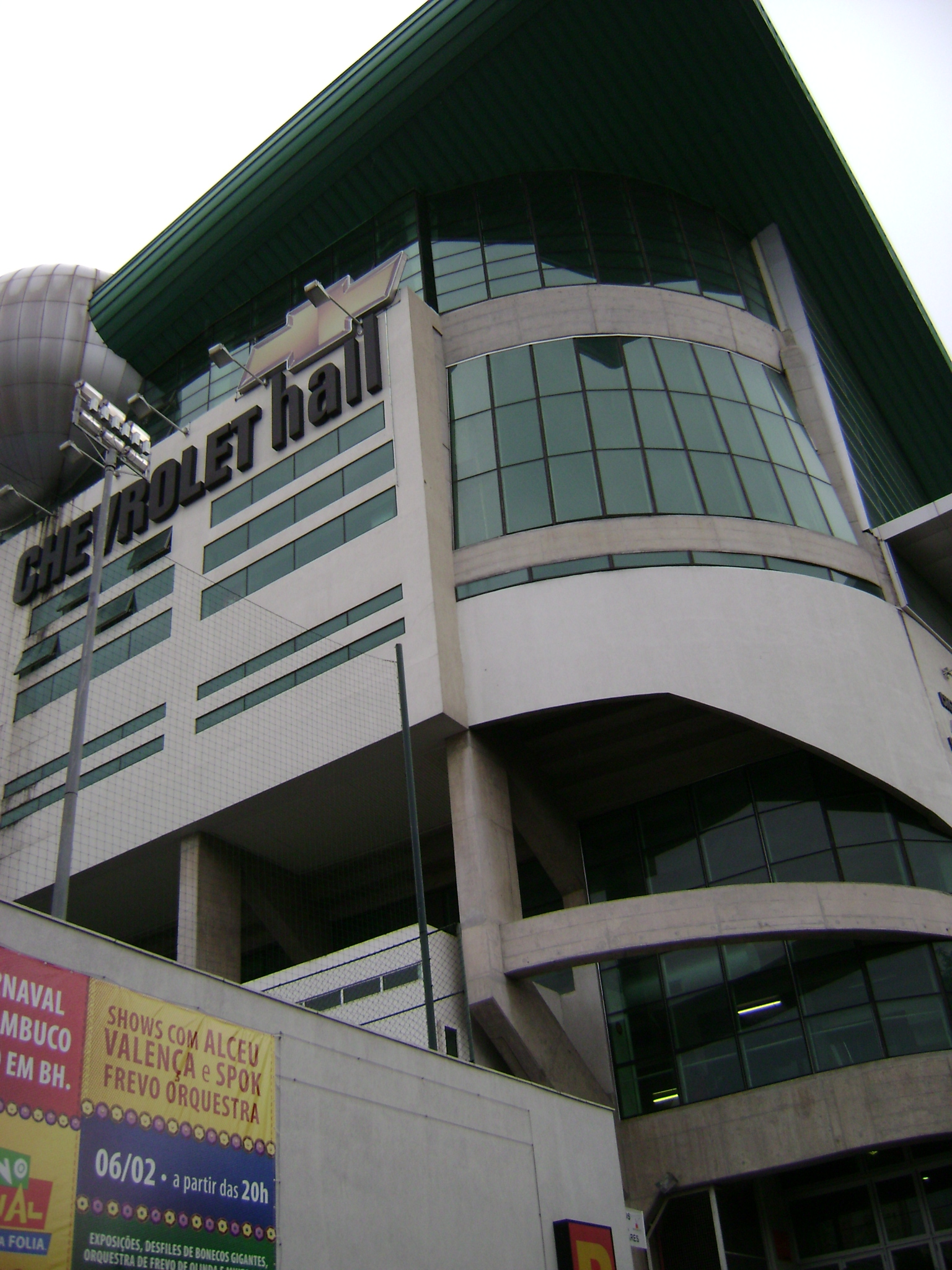
Arena Hall

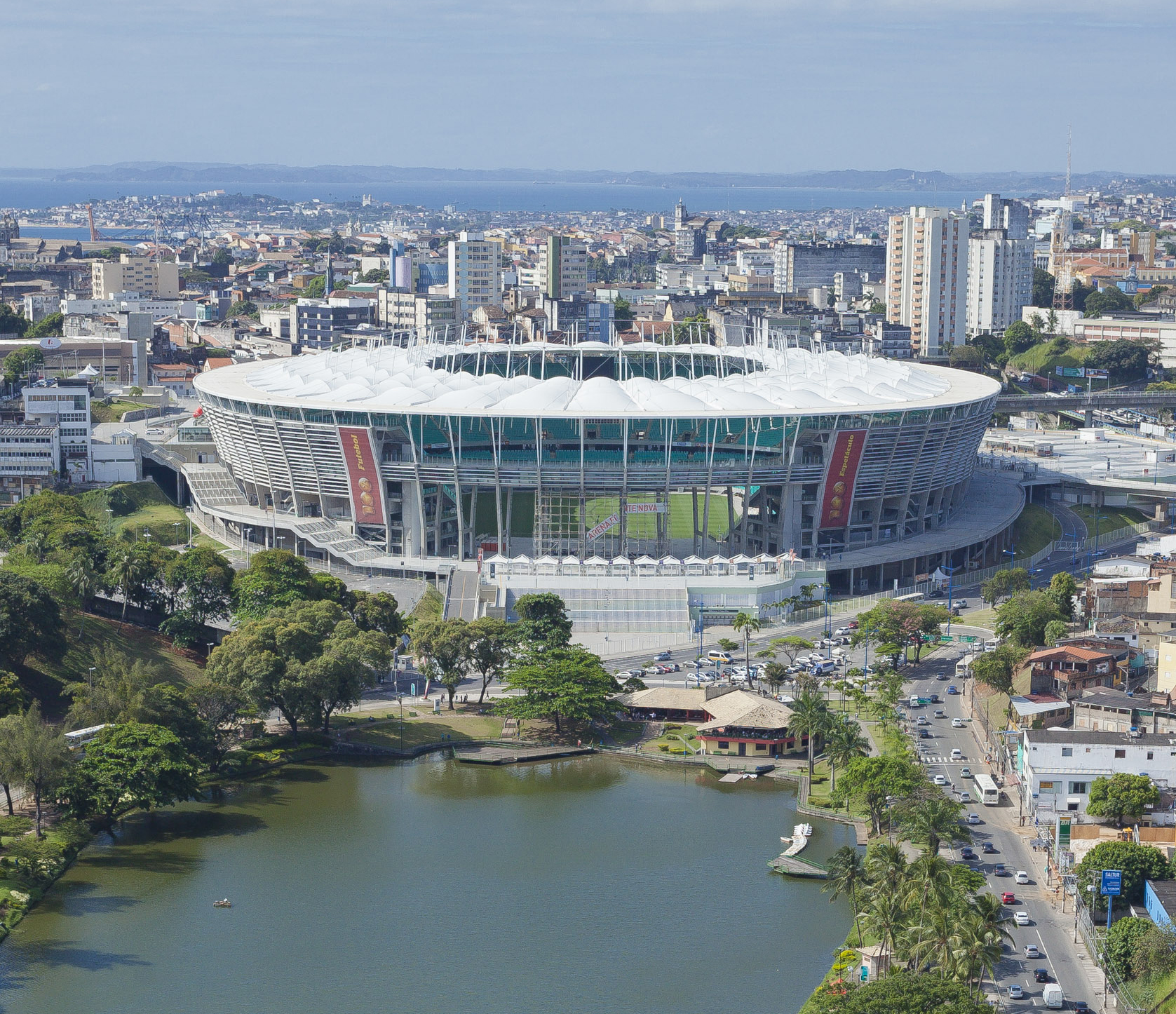
Arena Fonte Nova

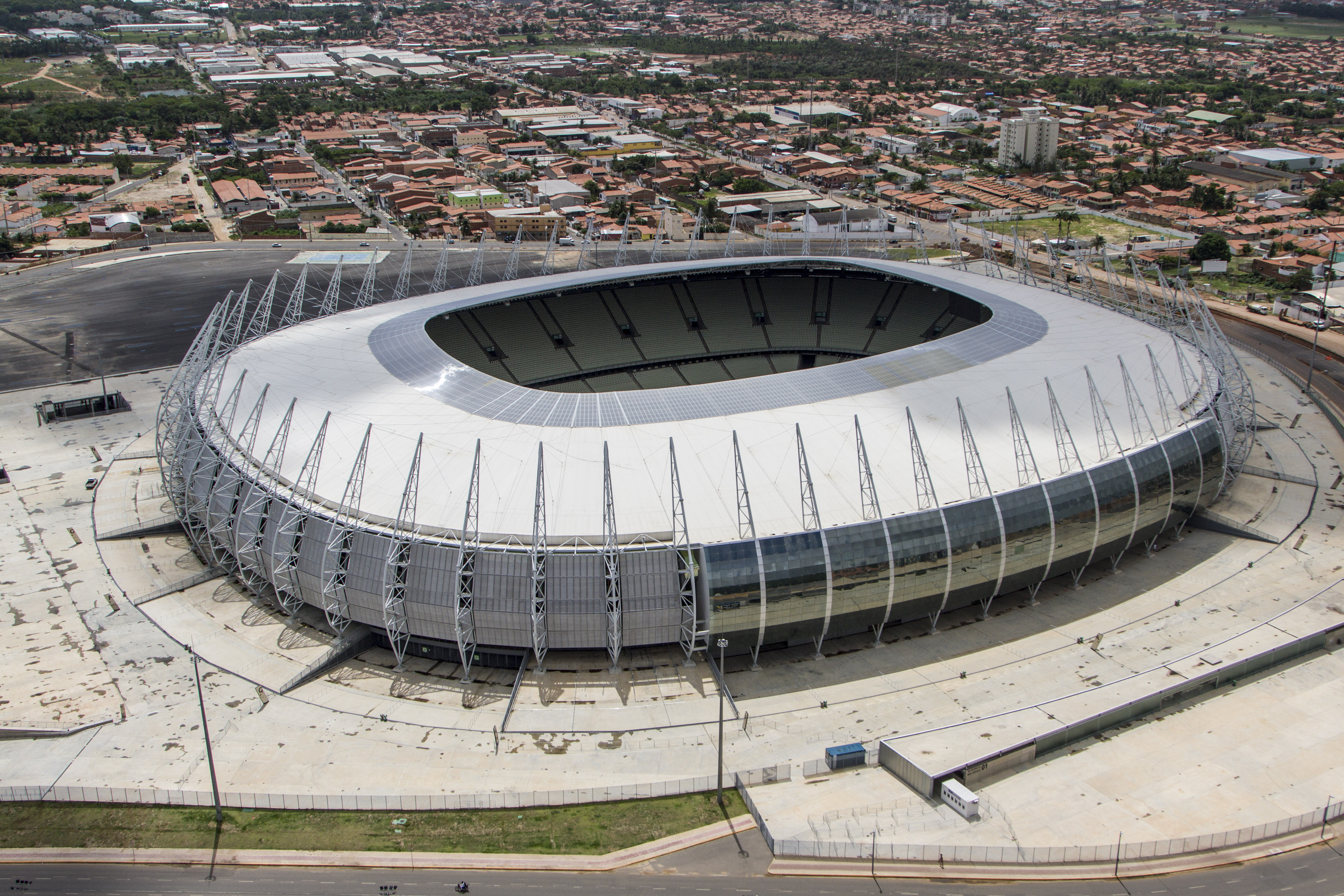
Castelão

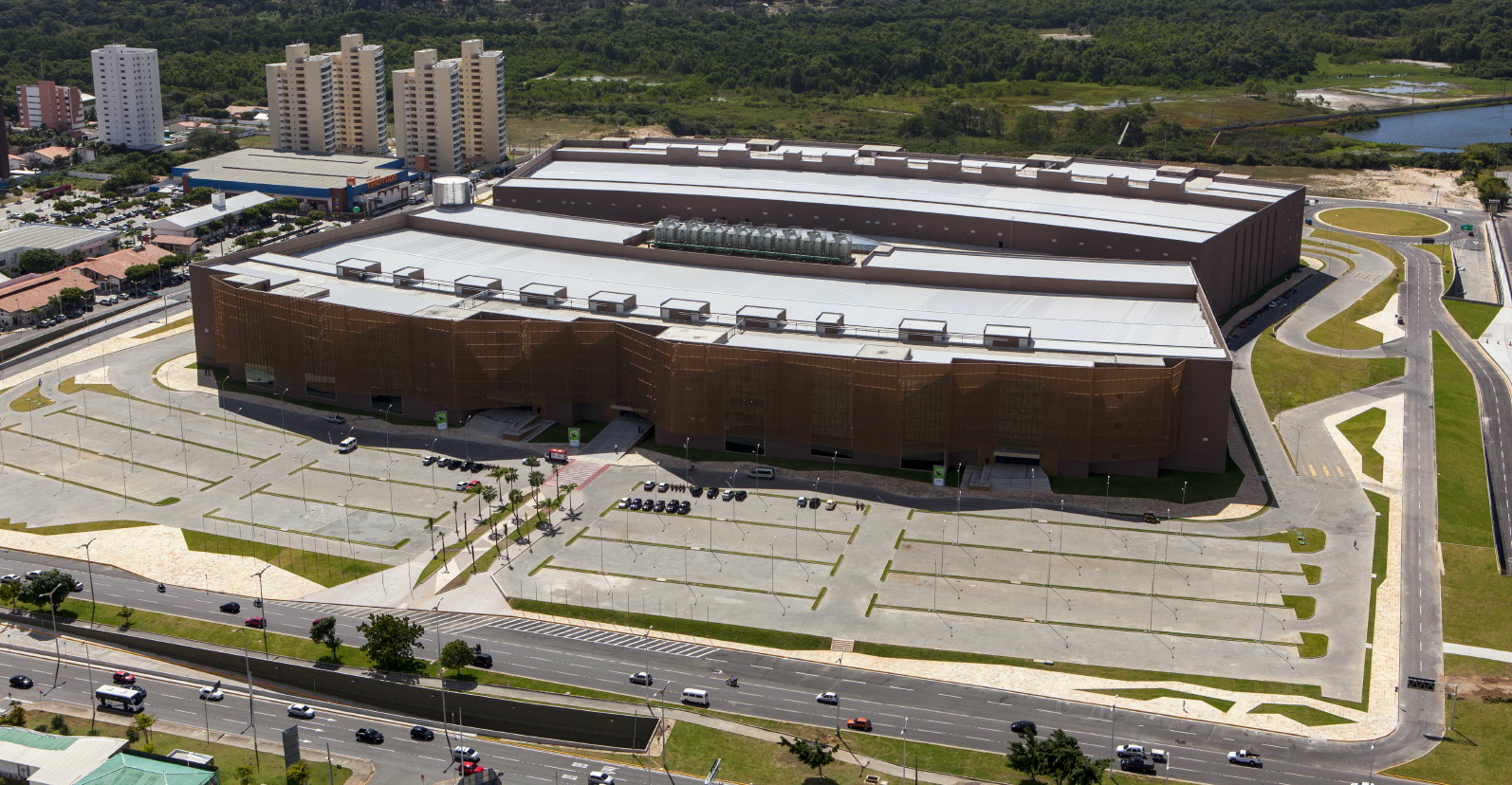
Centro de Eventos do Ceará

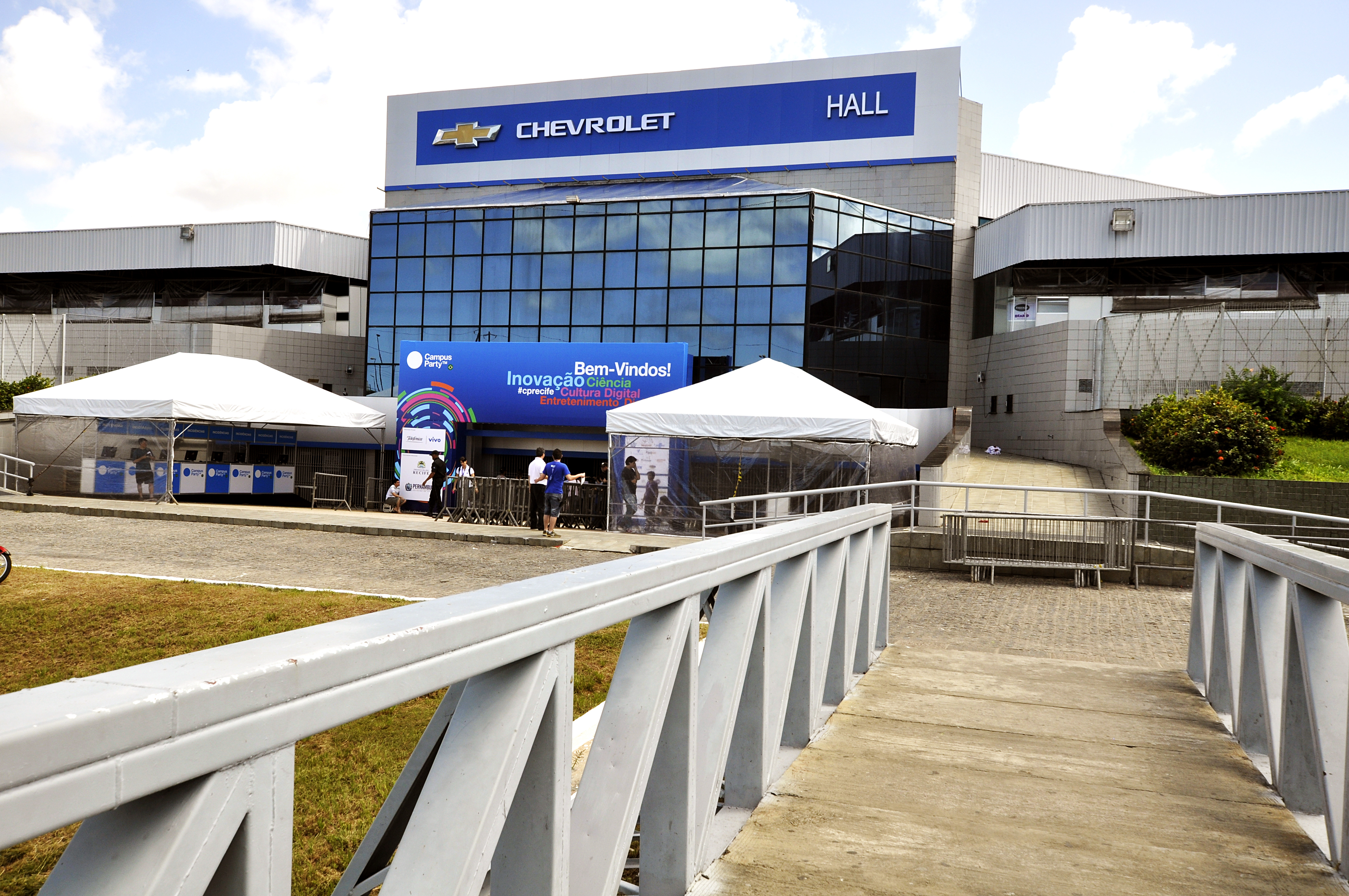
Classic Hall

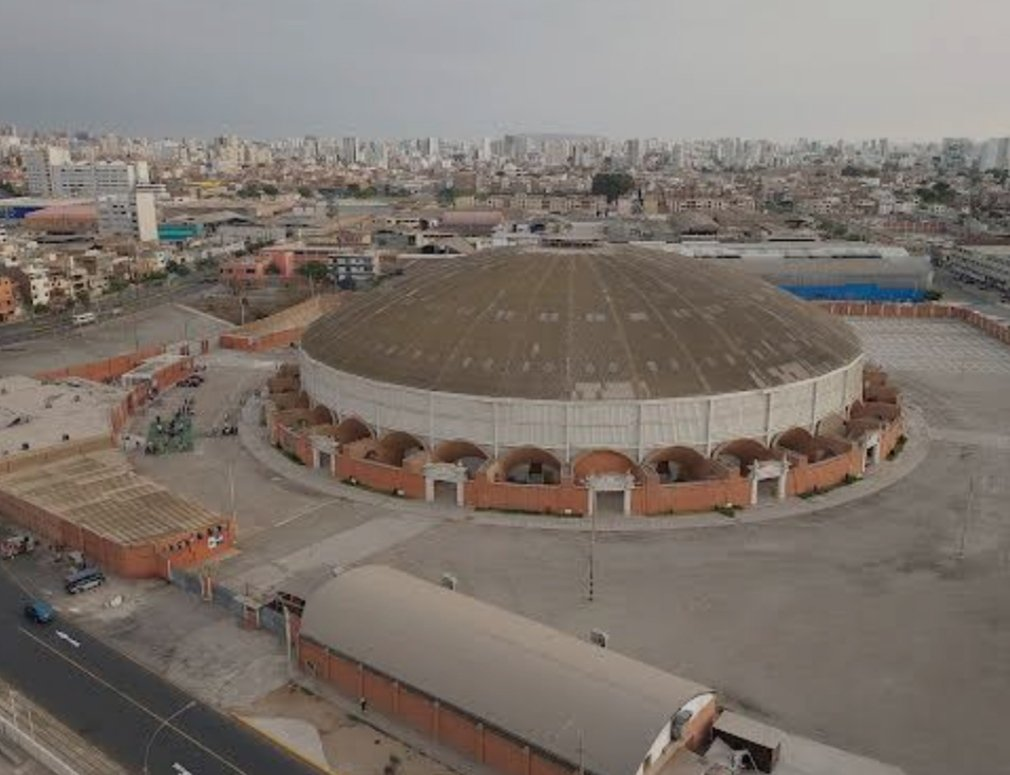
Coliseo Amauta

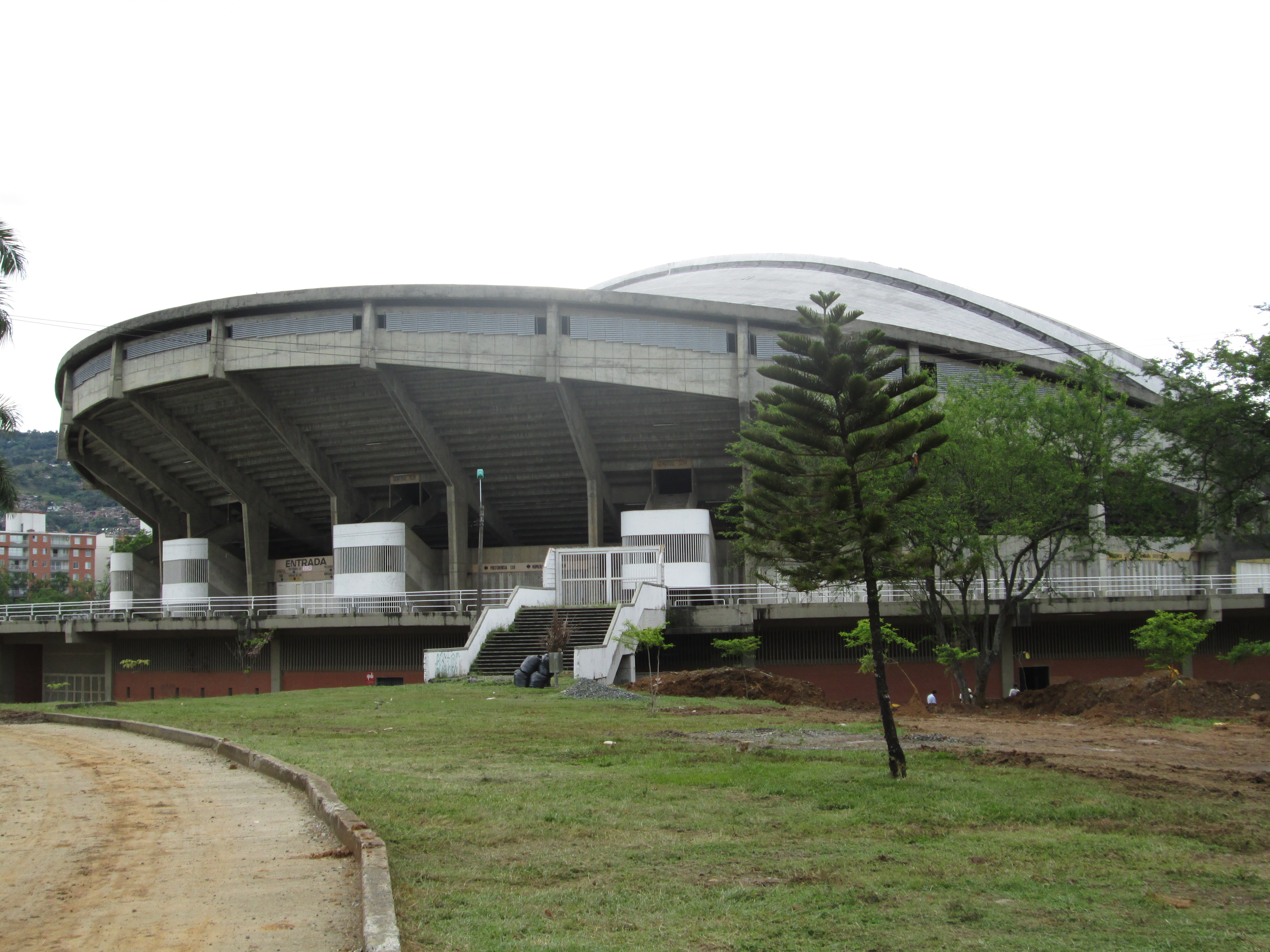
Coliseo El Pueblo

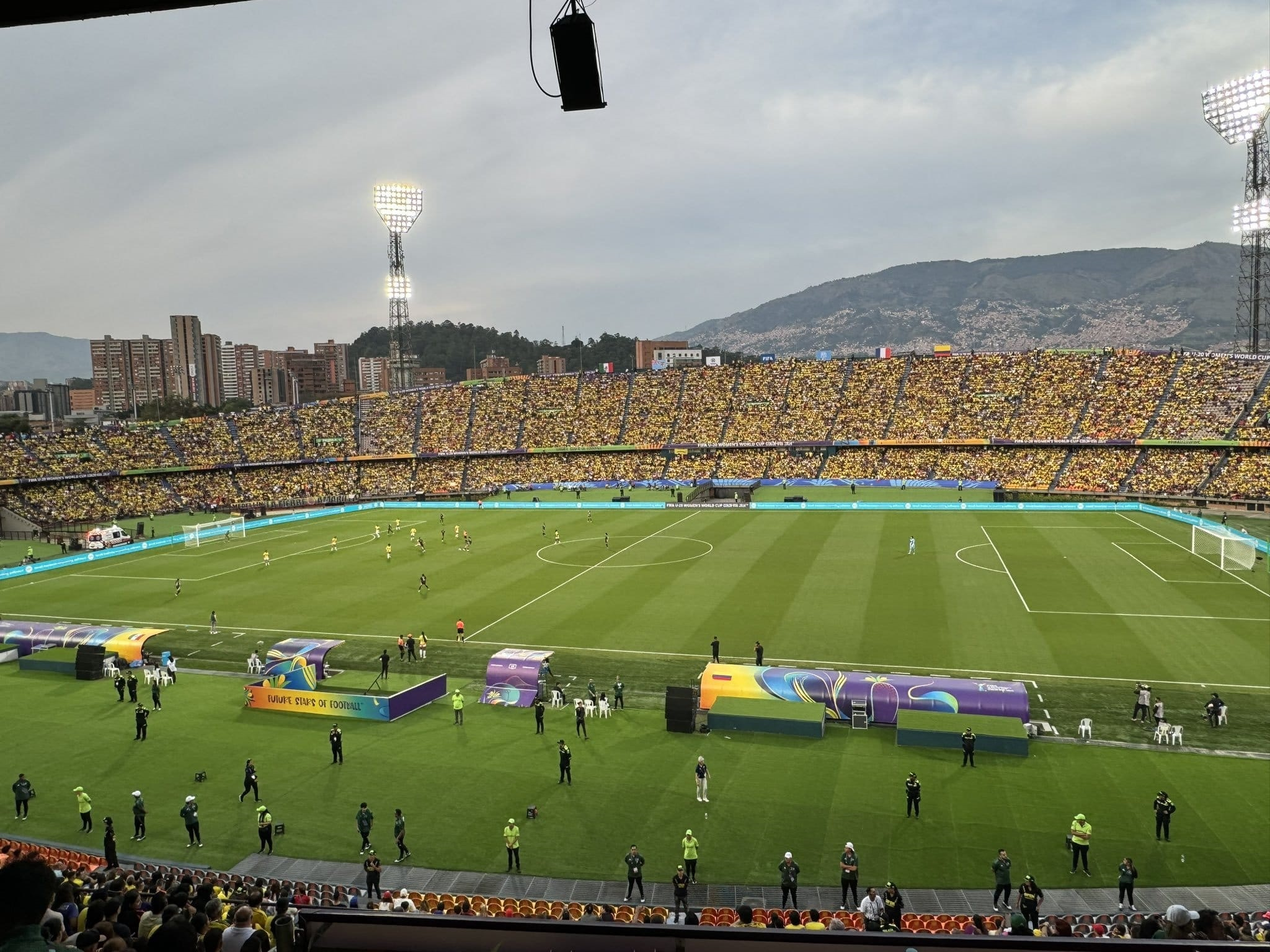
Estadio Atanasio Girardot

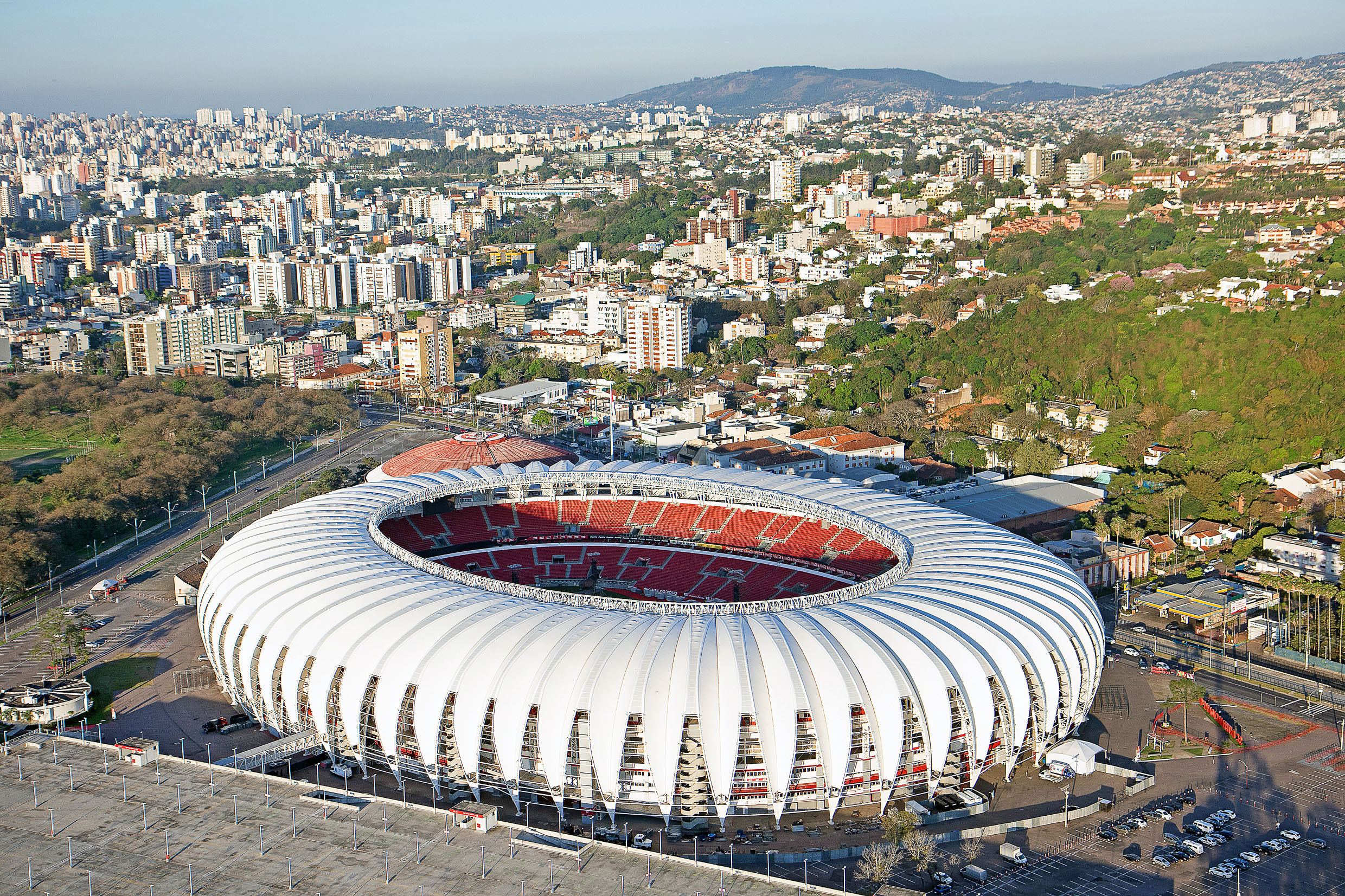
Estádio Beira-Rio

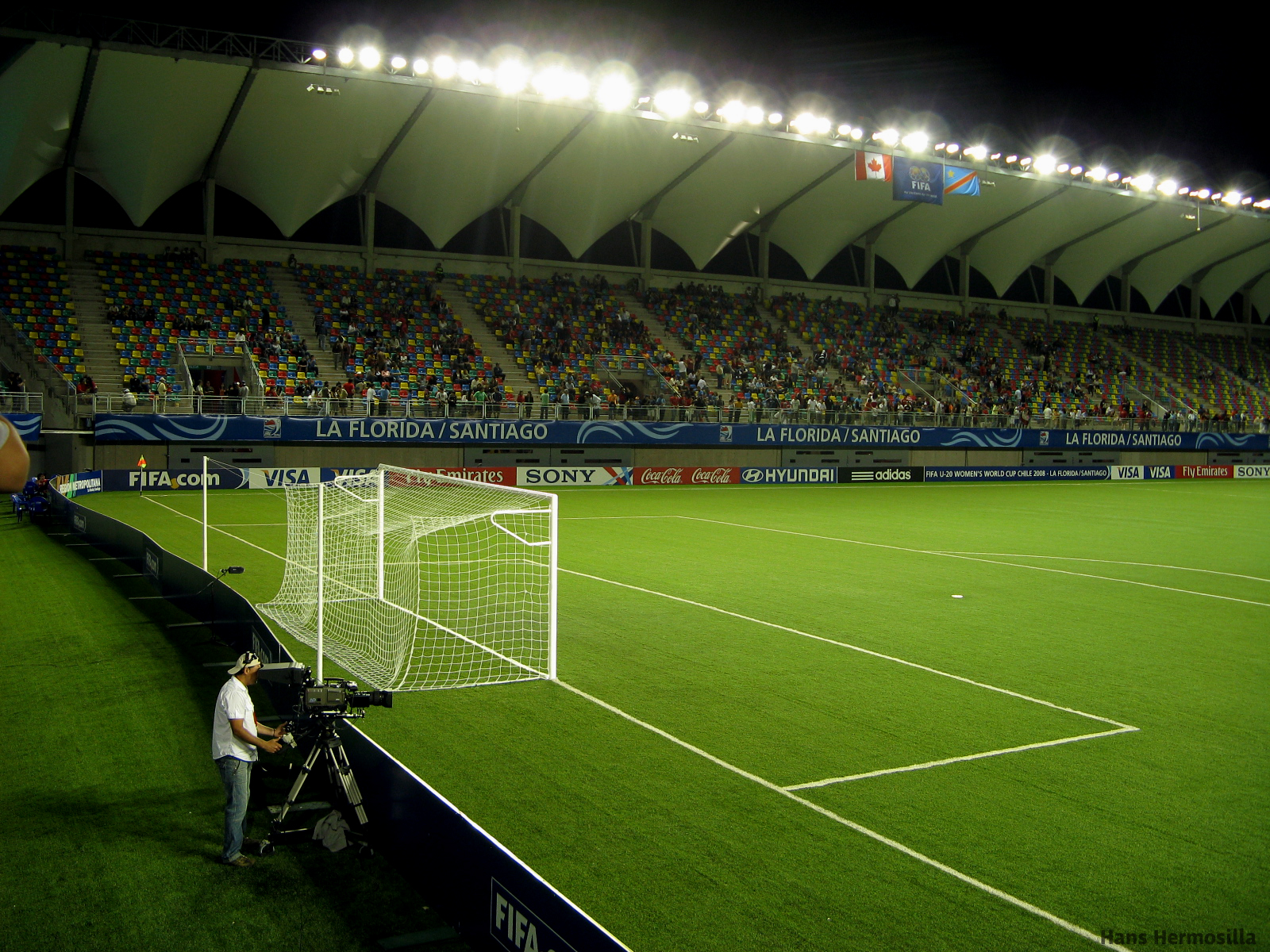
Estadio Bicentenario de La Florida

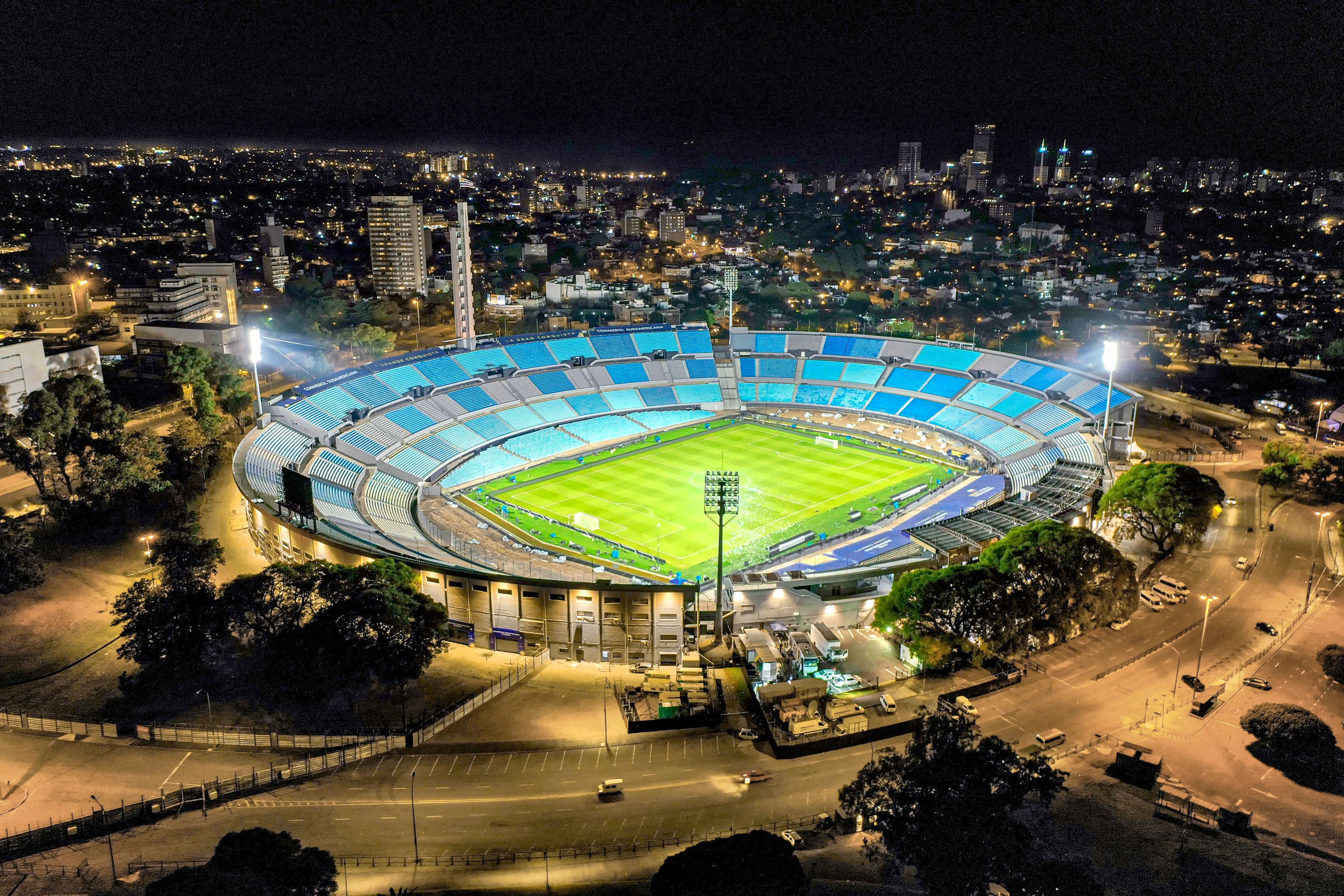
Estadio Centenario

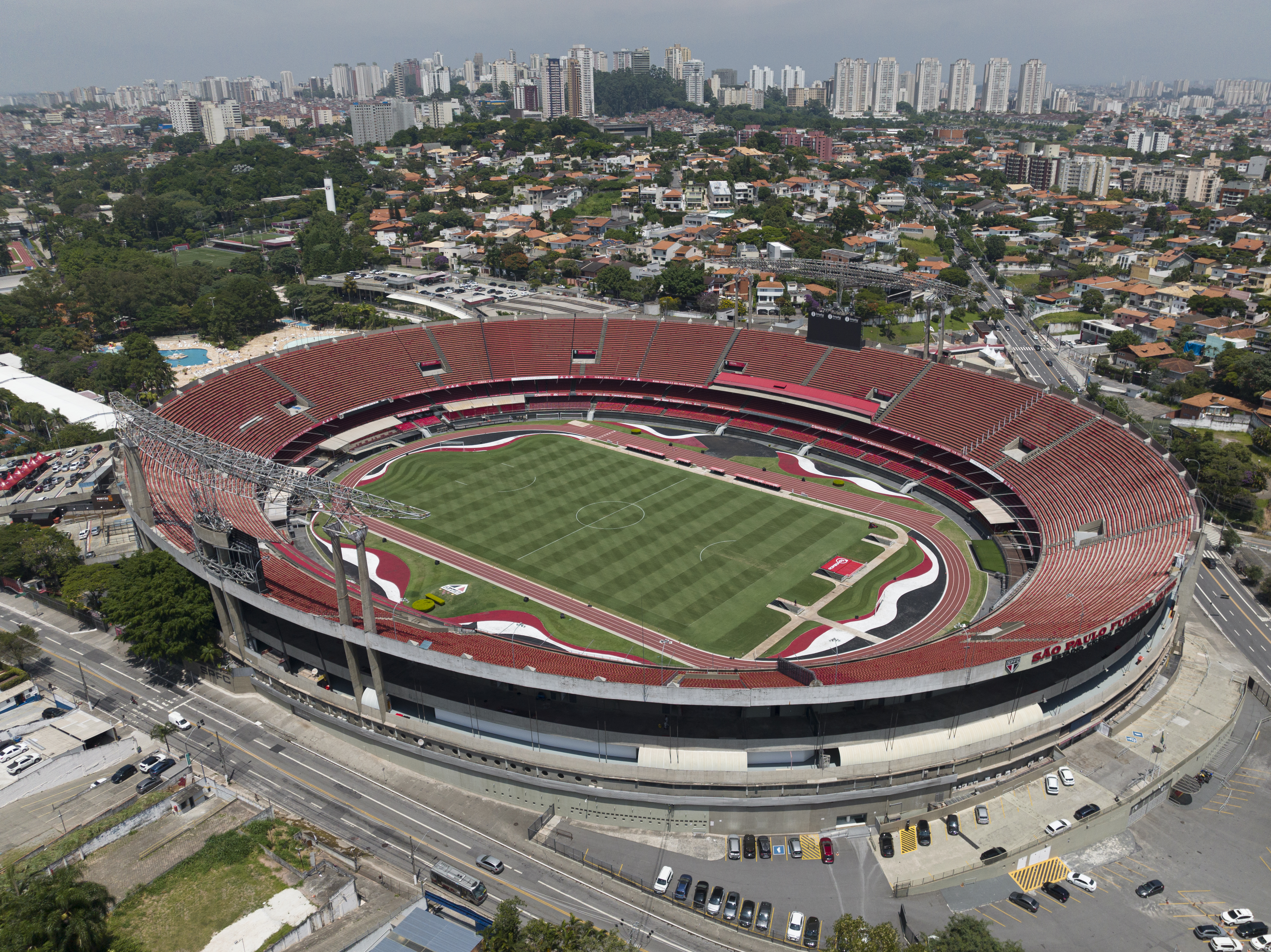
Estádio do Morumbi

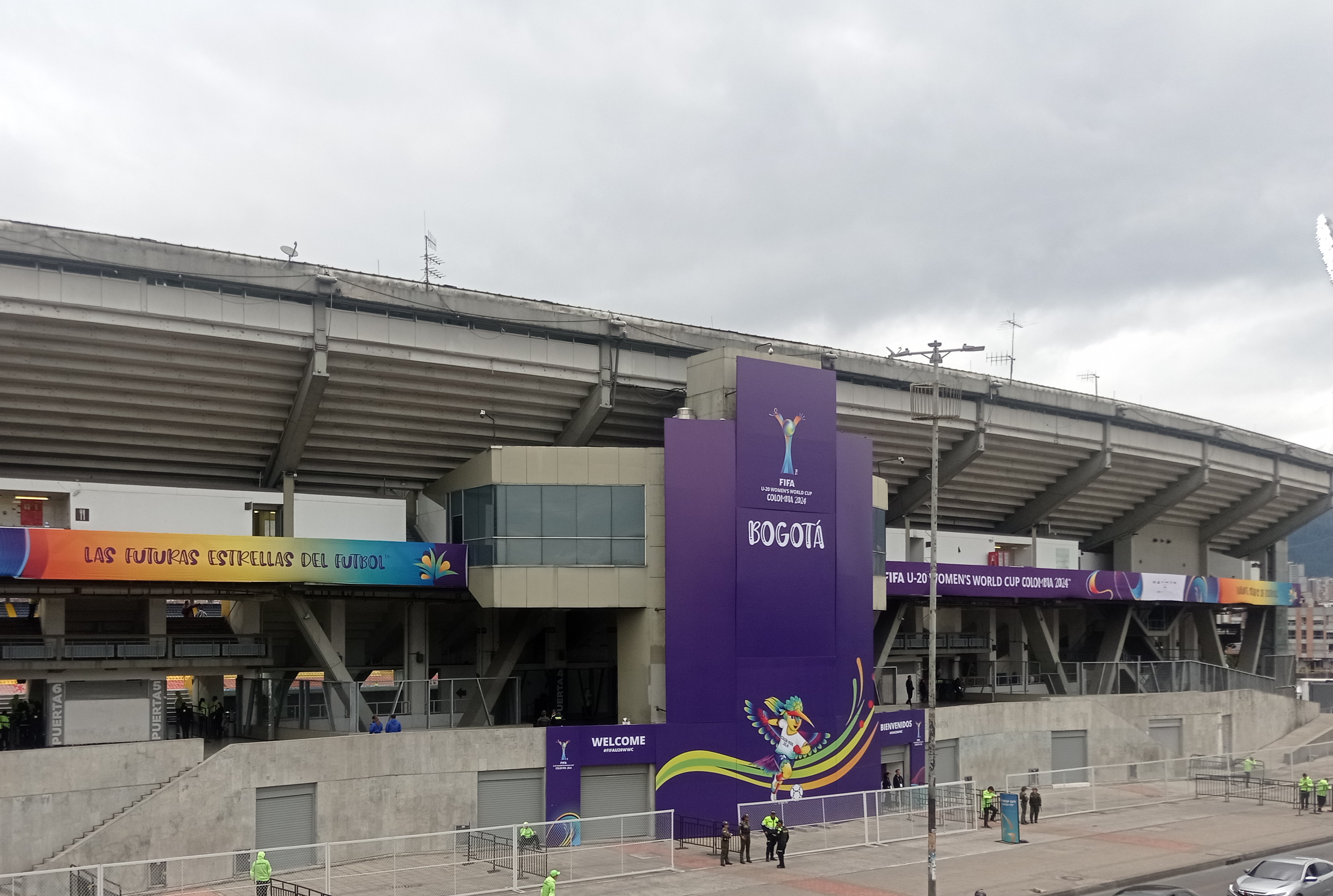
Estadio El Campín

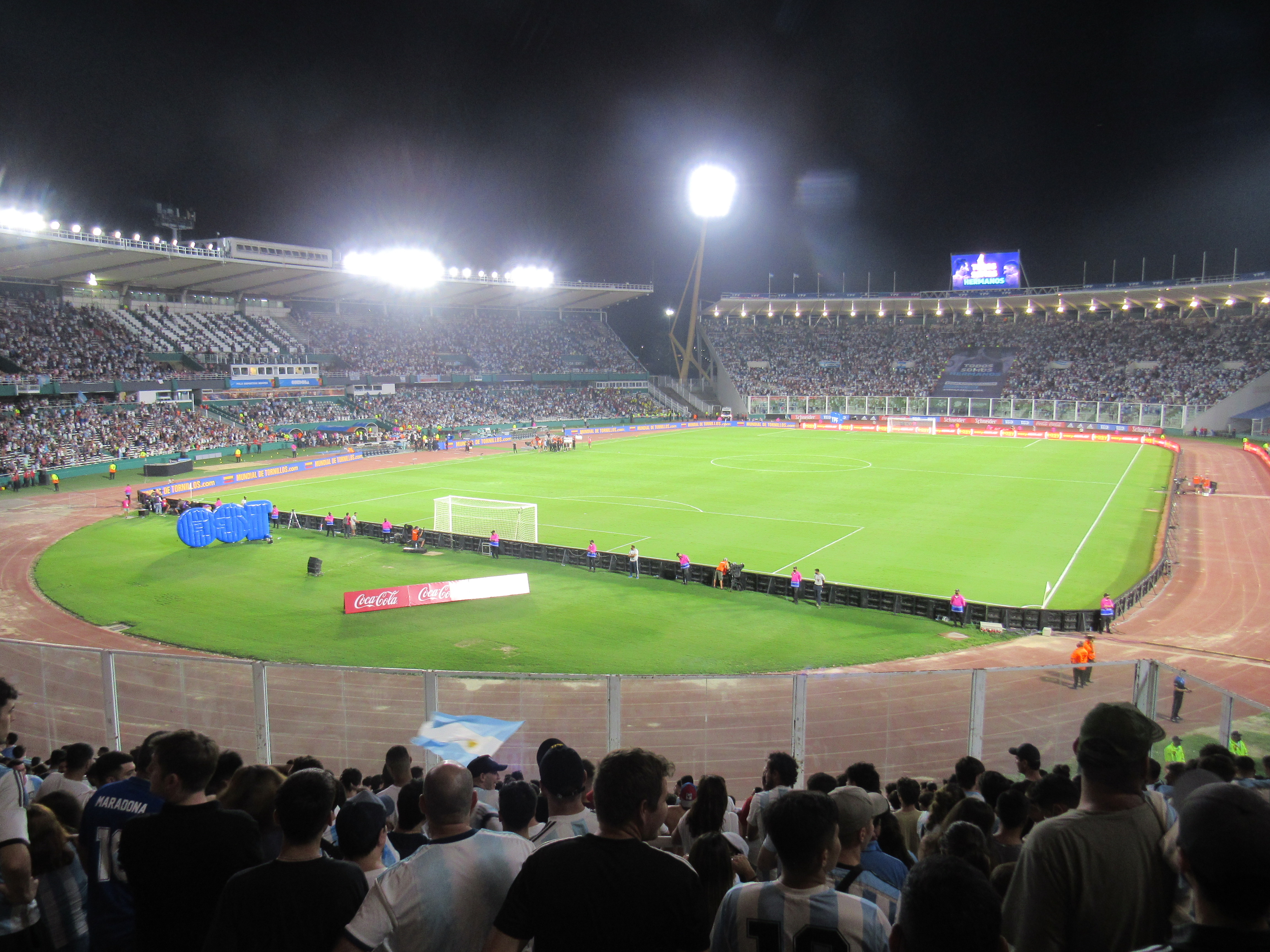
Estadio Mario Alberto Kempes

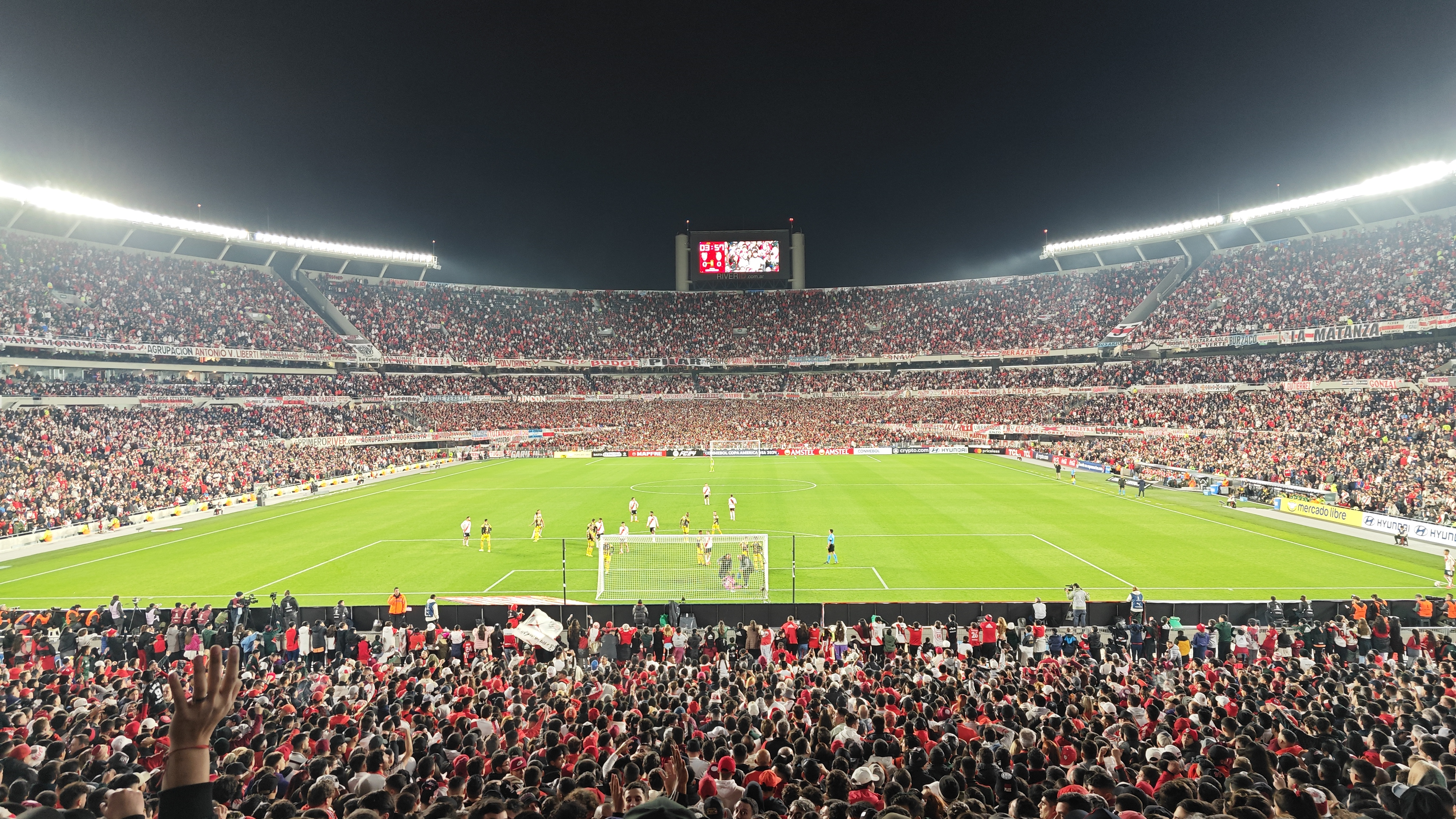
Estadio Monumental

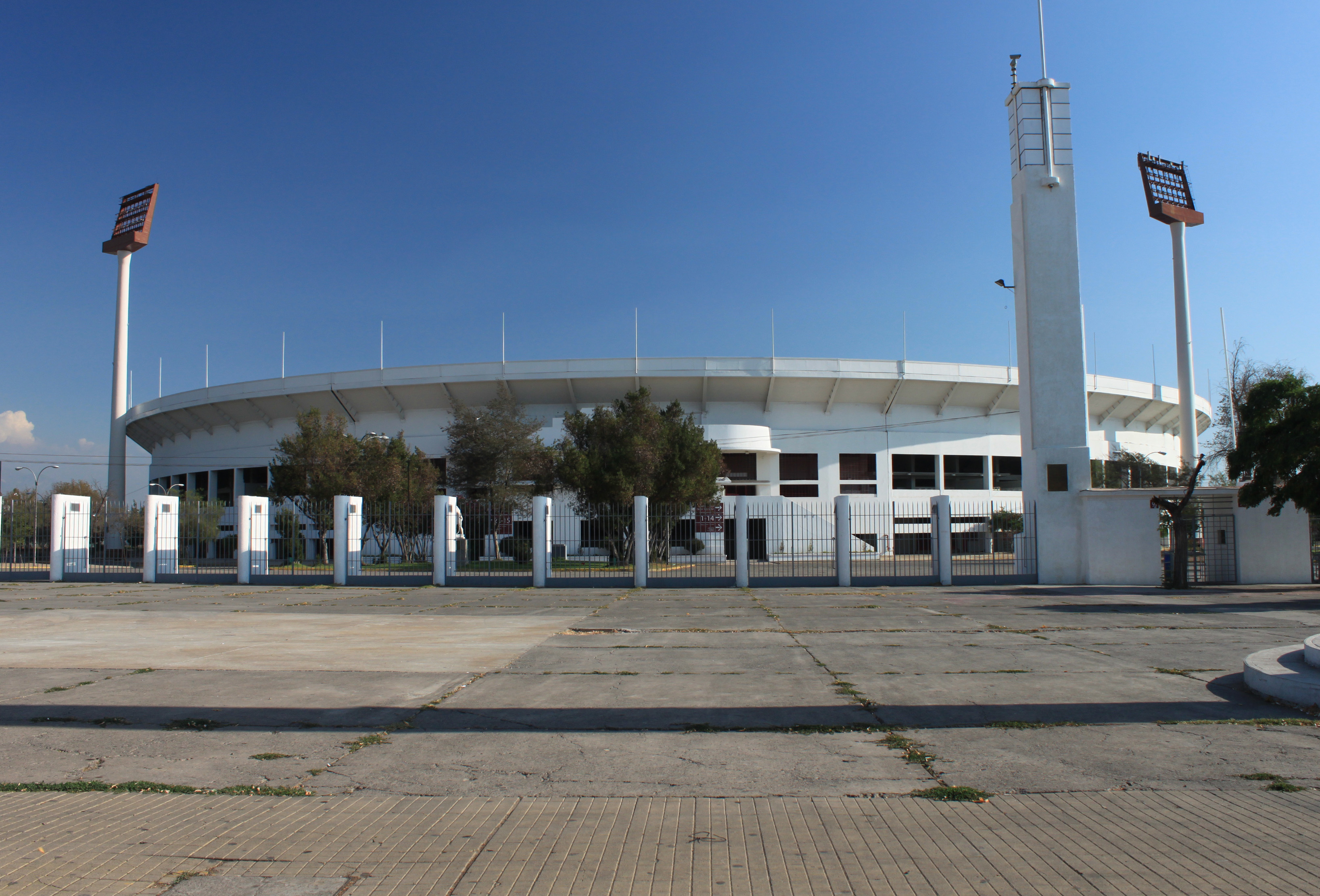
Estadio Nacional Julio Martínez Prádanos

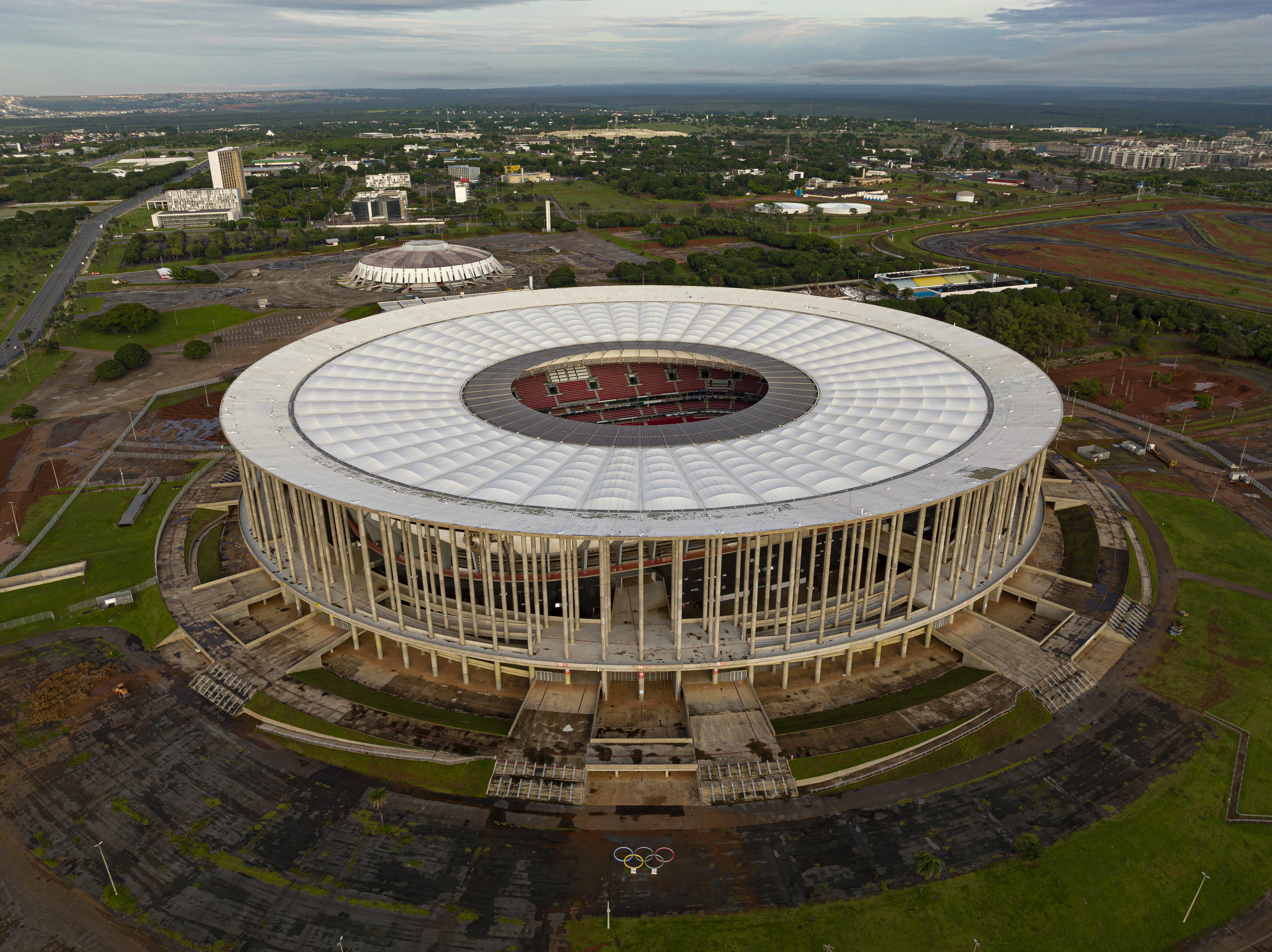
Estádio Nacional Mané Garrincha

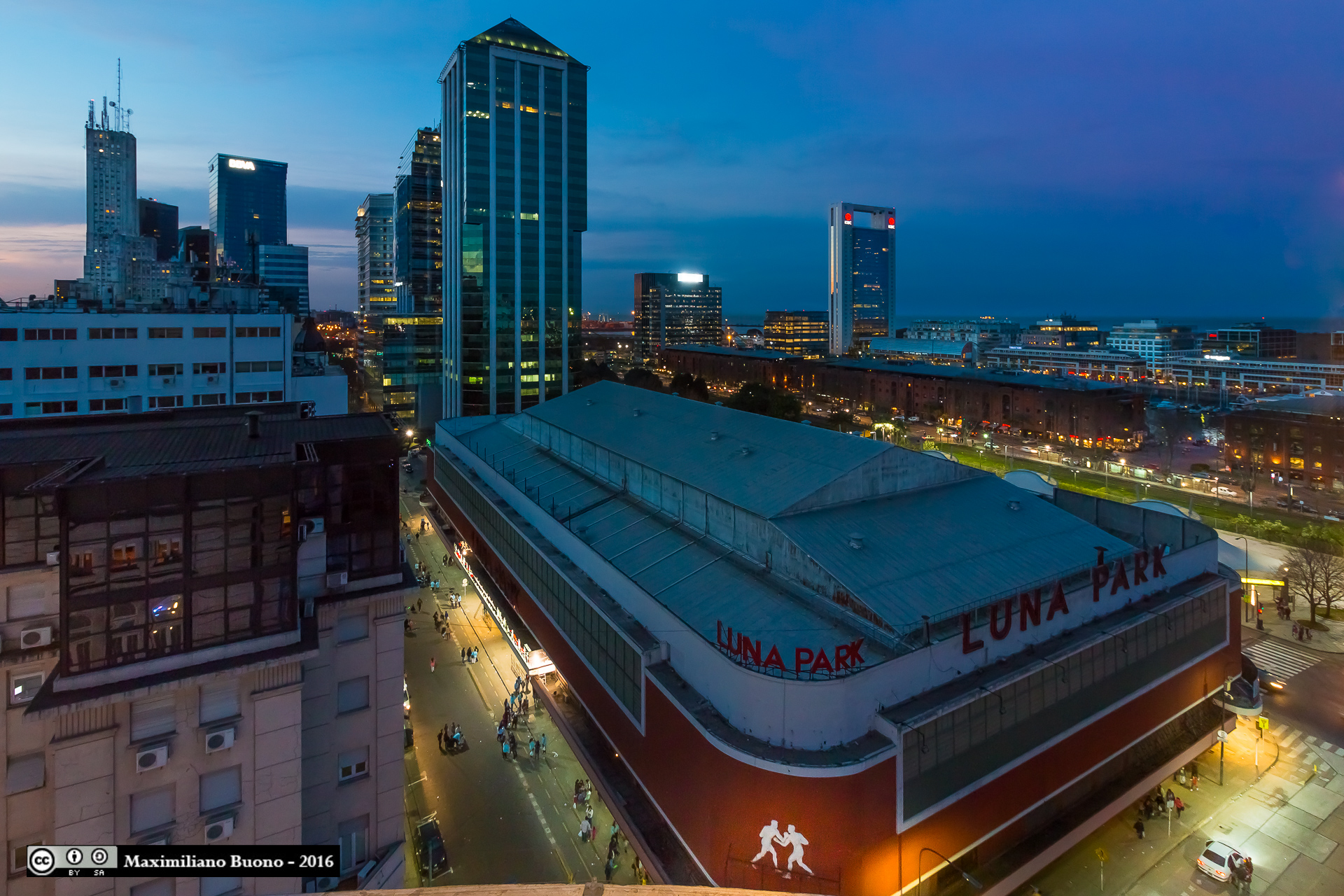
Estadio Luna Park

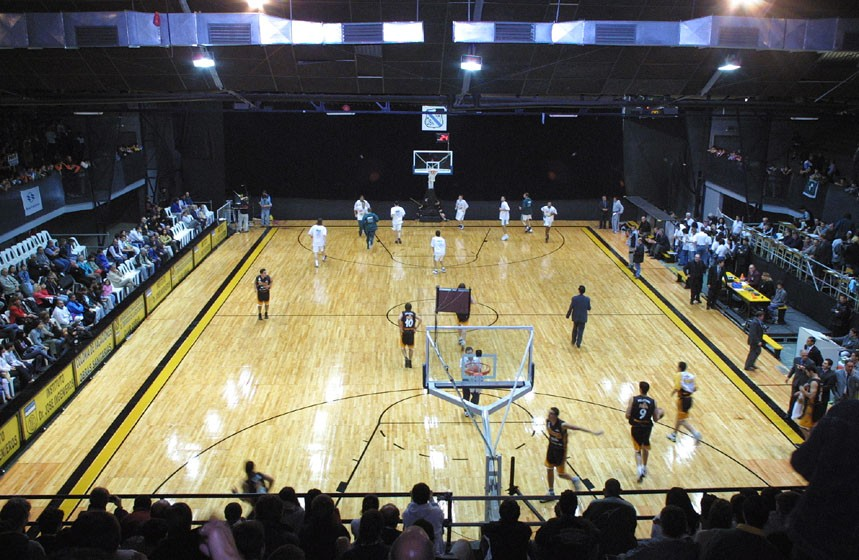
Estadio Obras Sanitarias

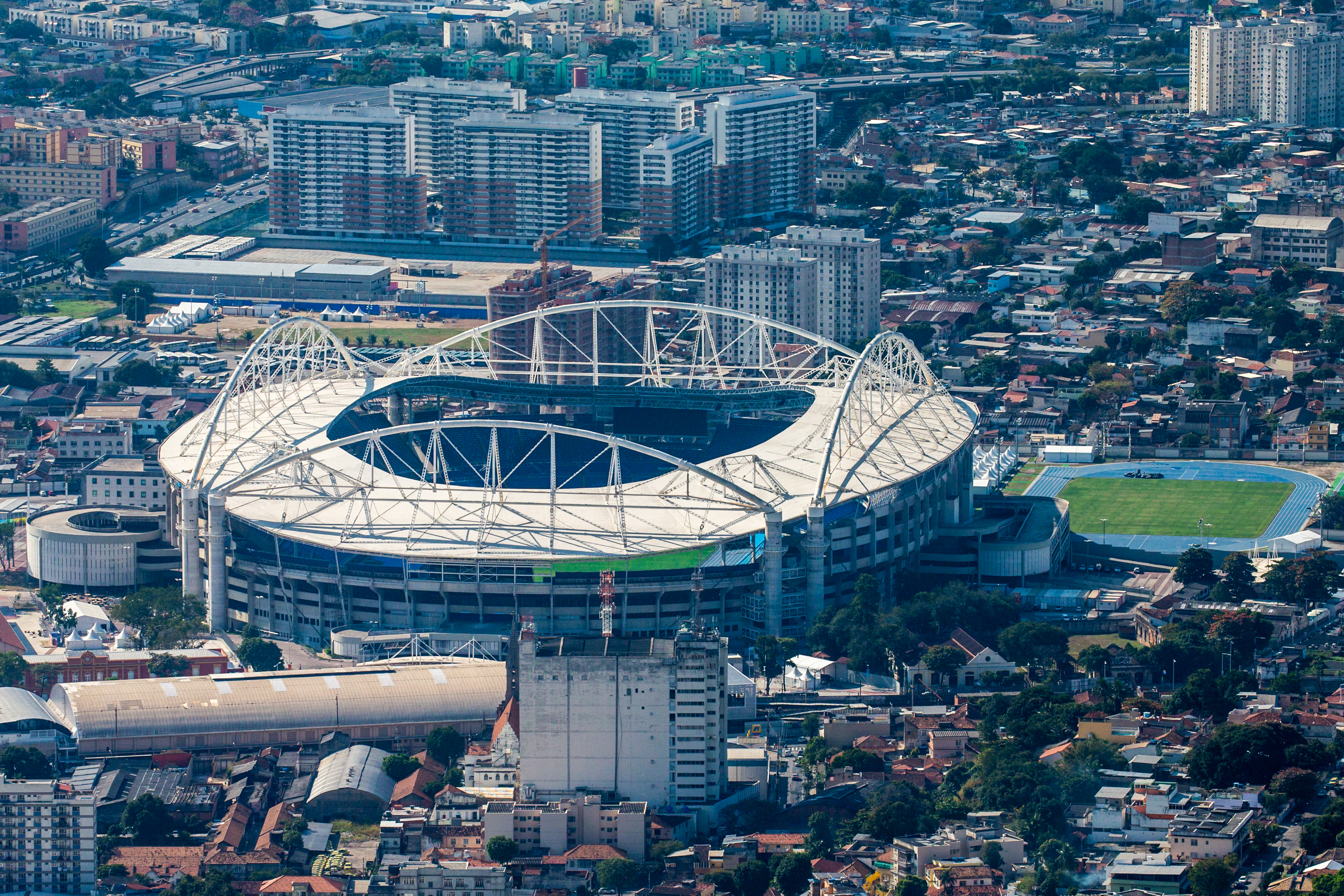
Estádio Olímpico Nilton Santos

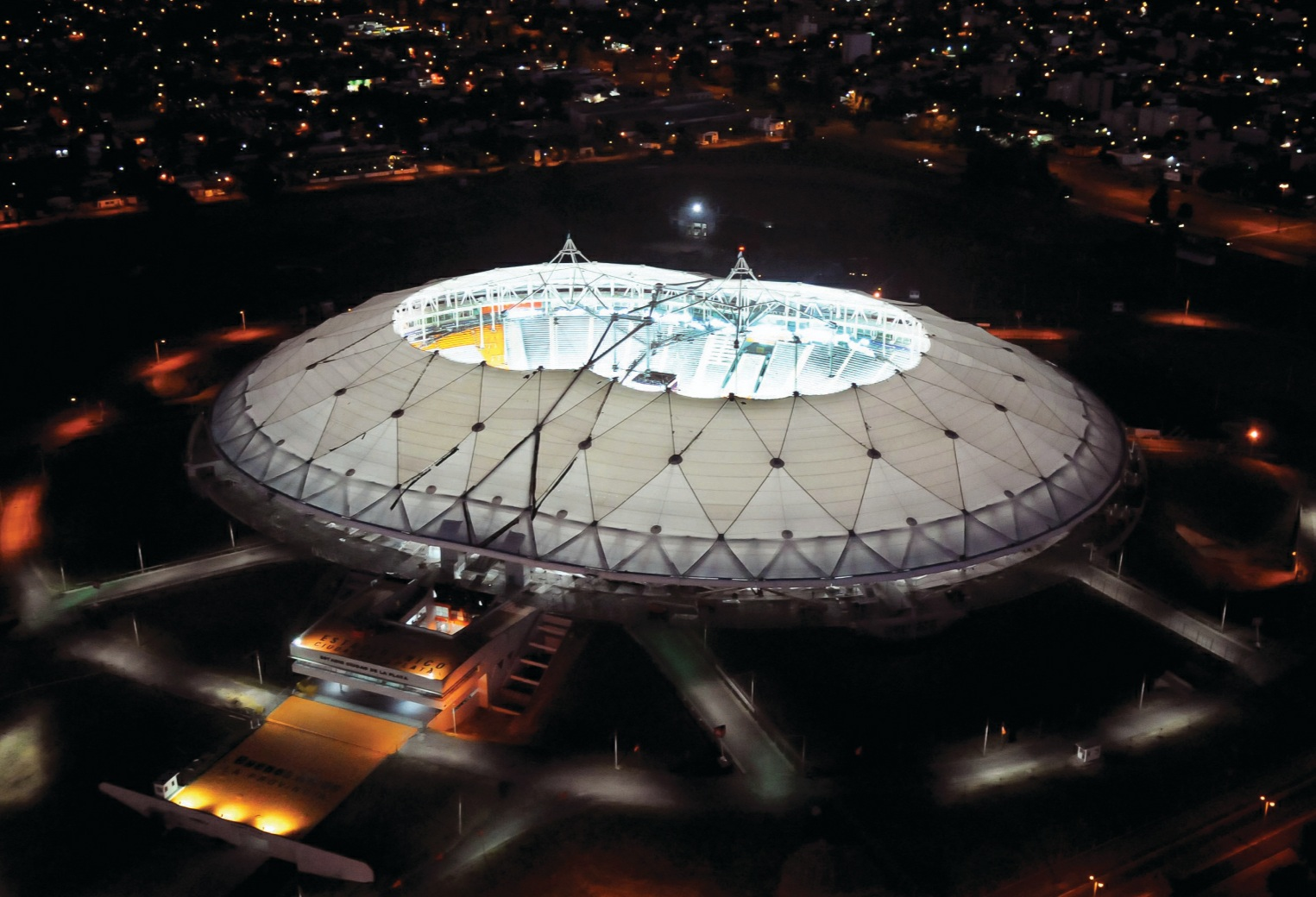
Estadio Único Diego Armando Maradona

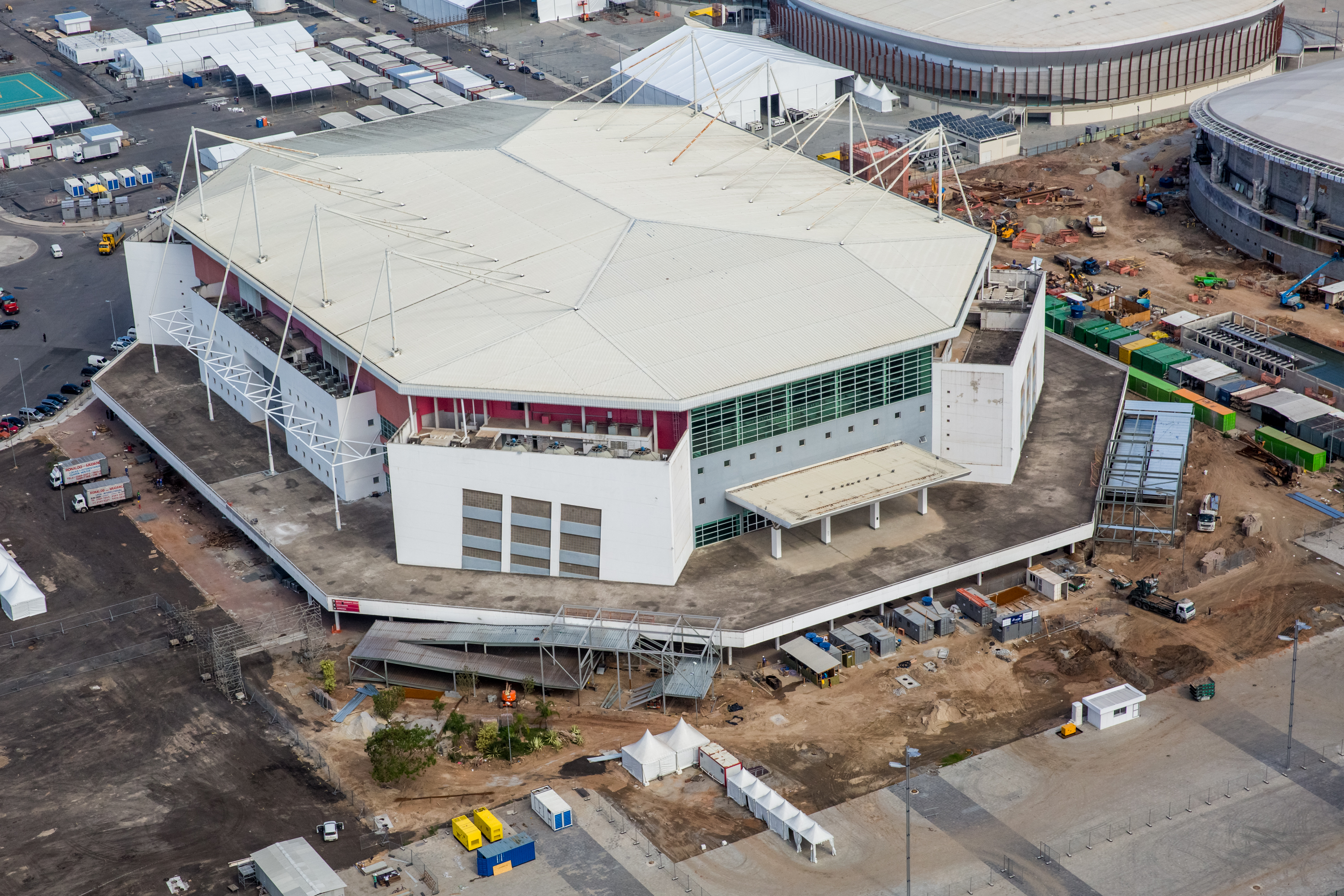
Farmasi Arena

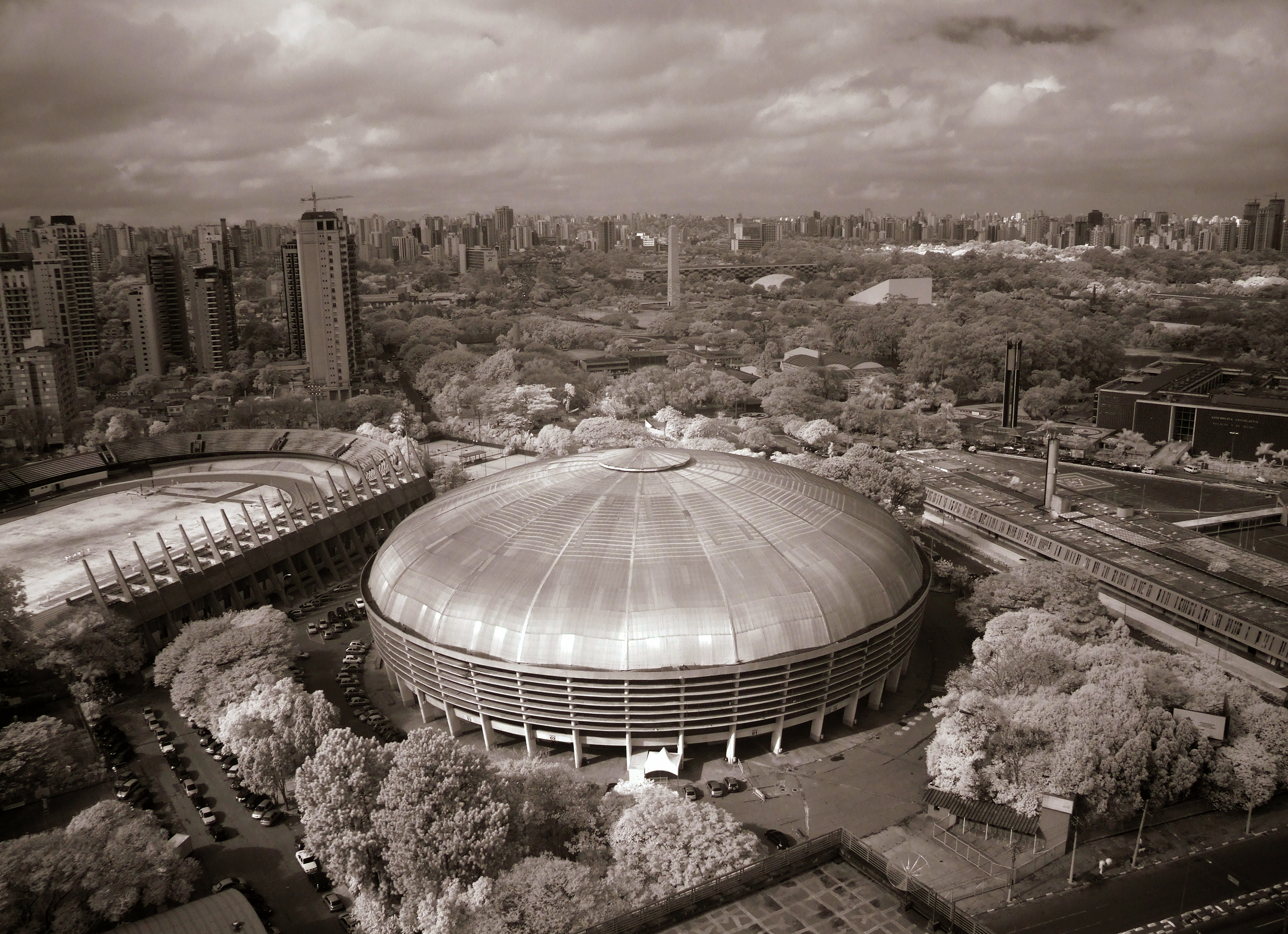
Ginásio do Ibirapuera

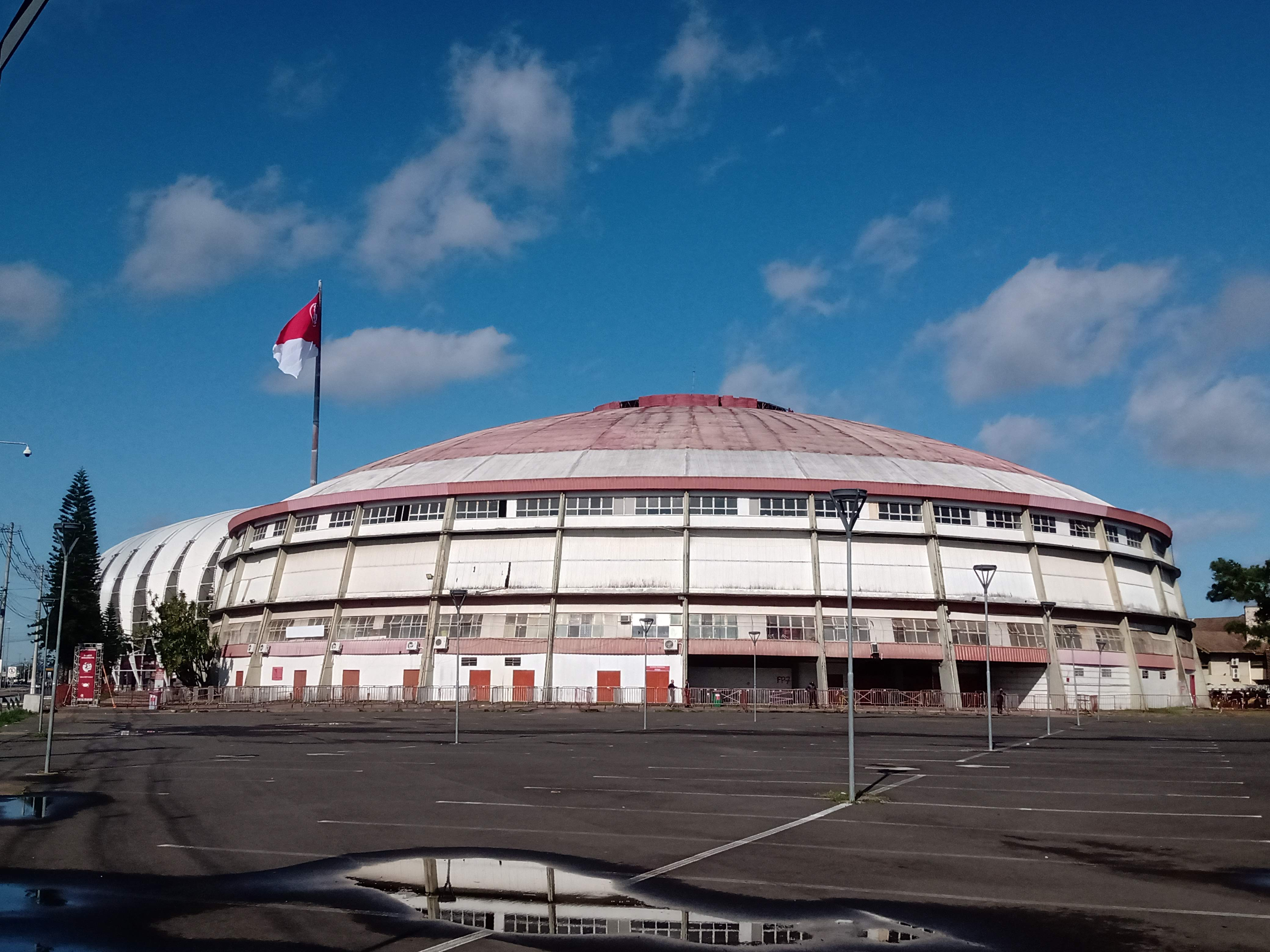
Gigantinho

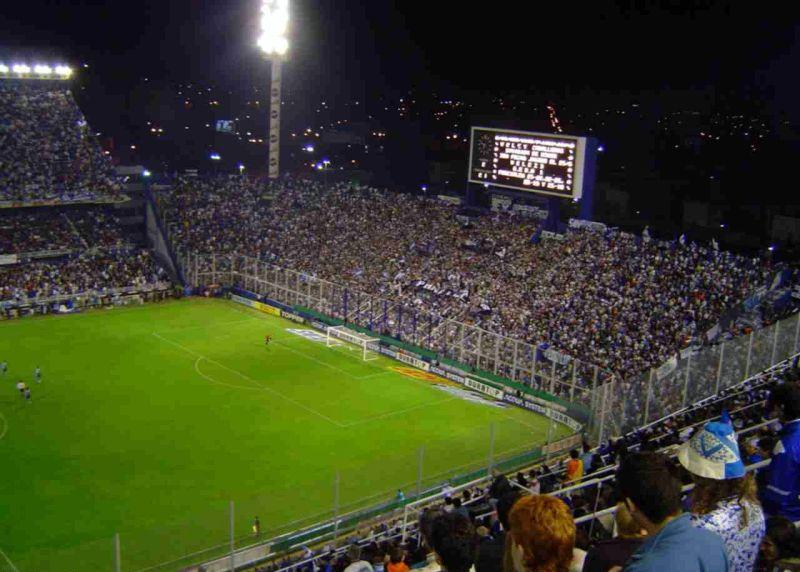
José Amalfitani Stadium

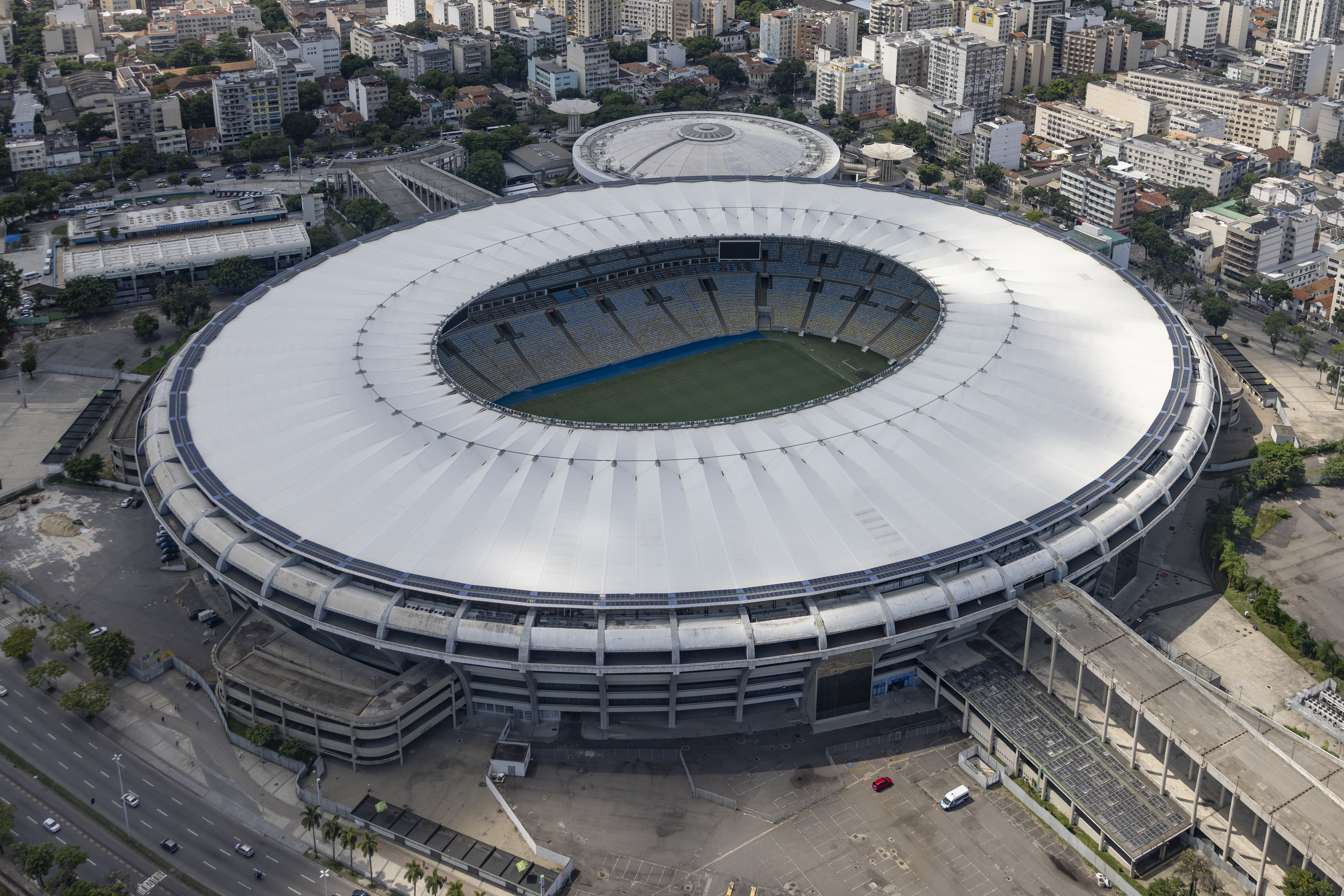
Maracanã Stadium

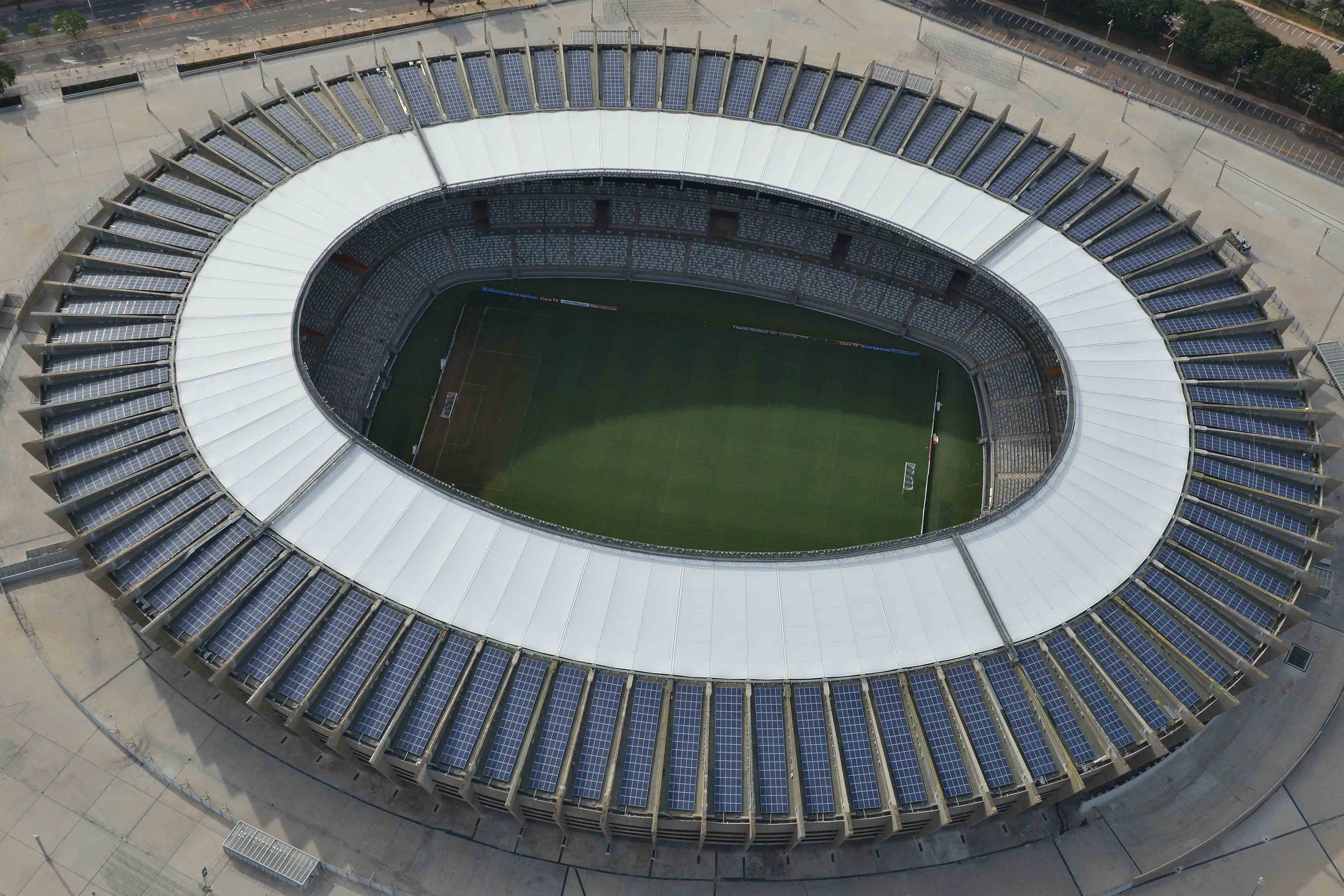
Mineirão

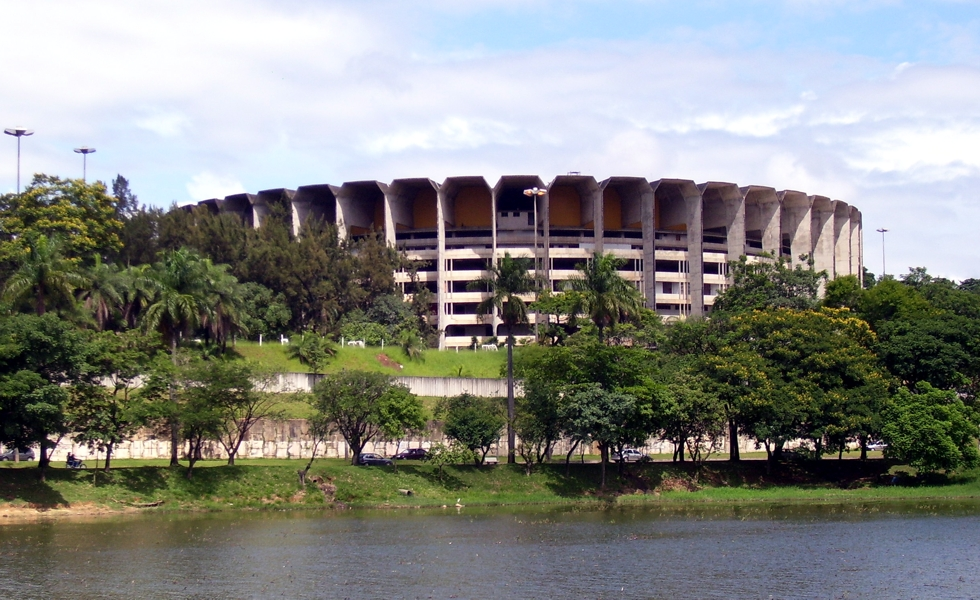
Mineirinho

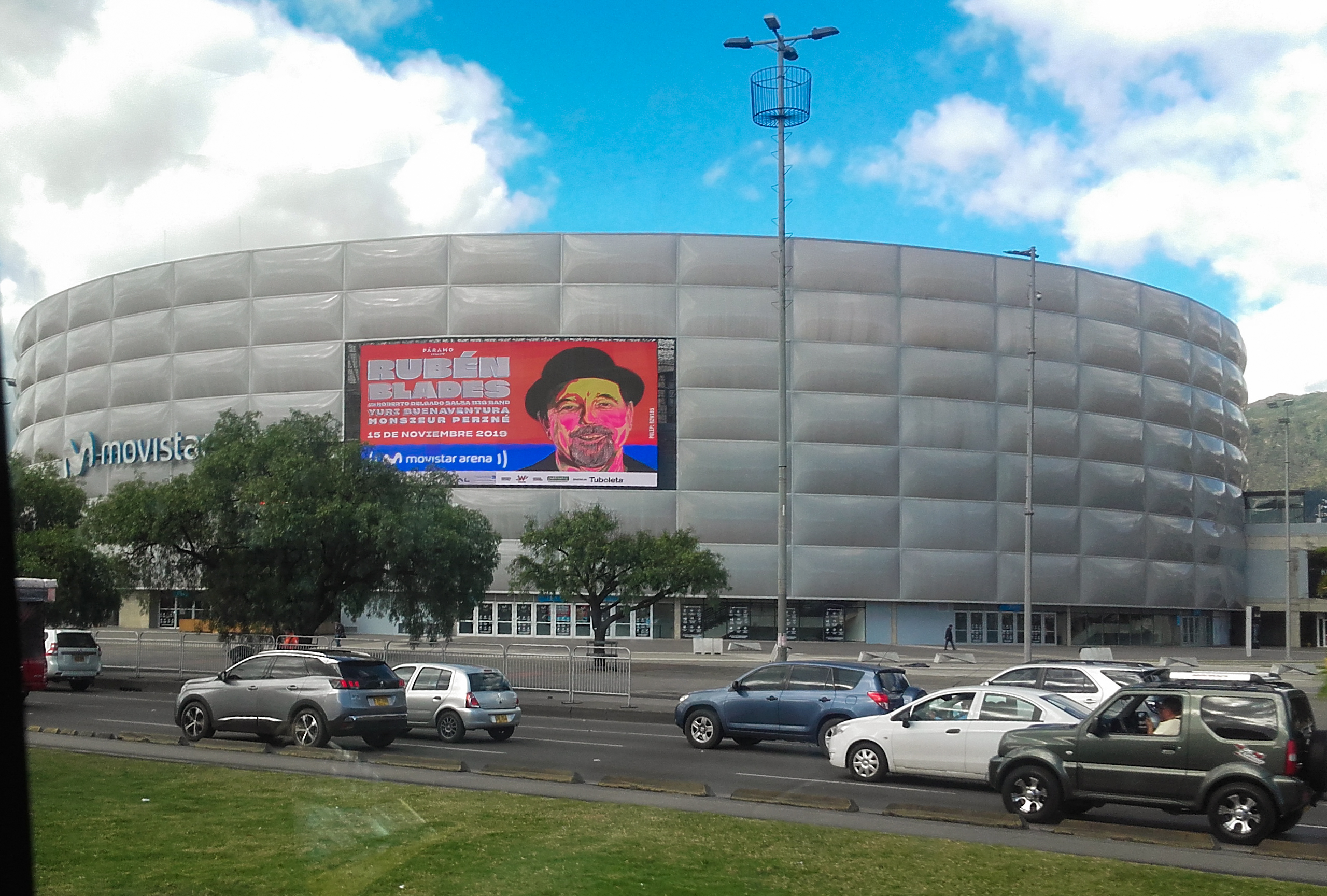
Movistar Arena

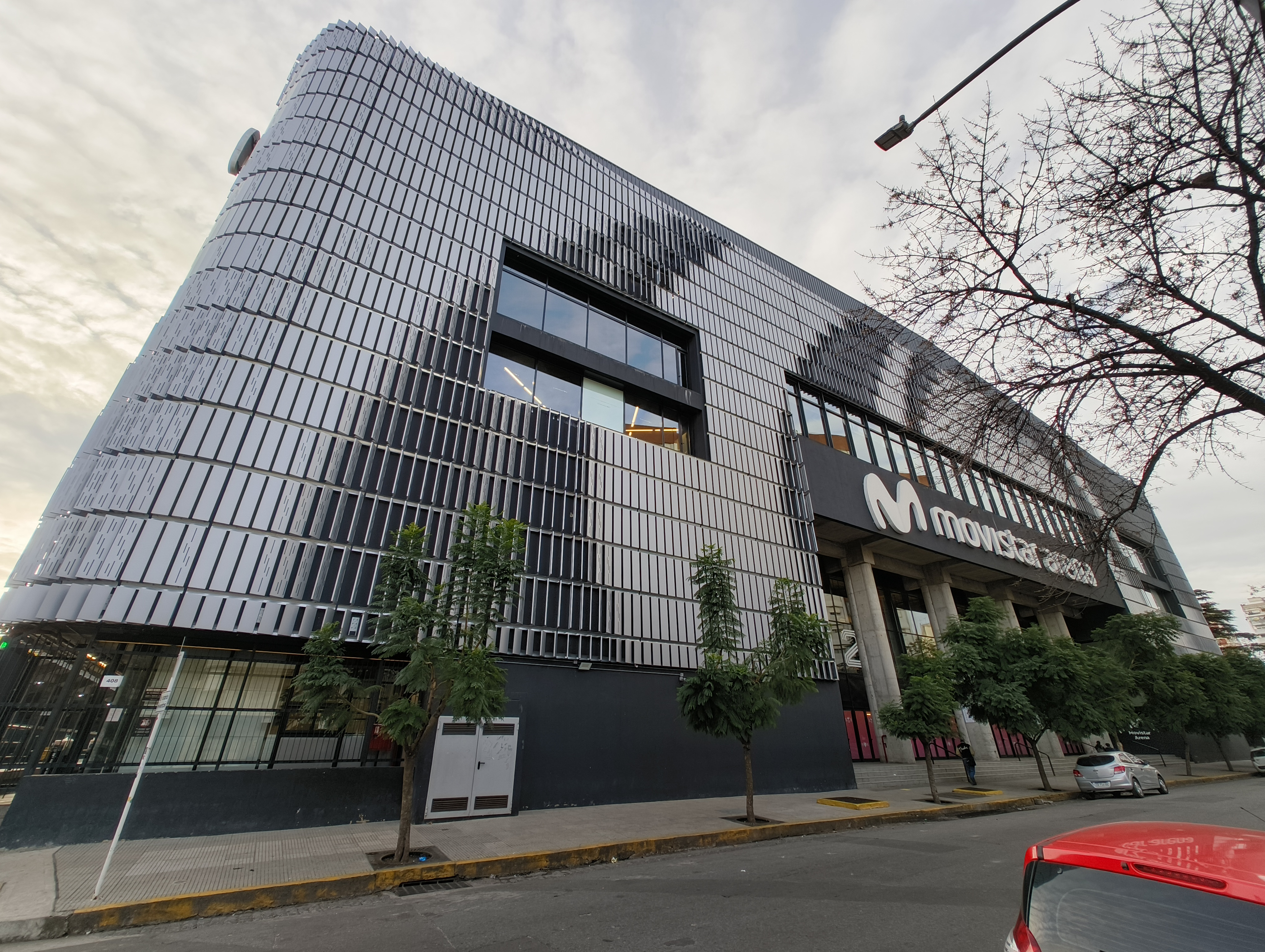
Movistar Arena

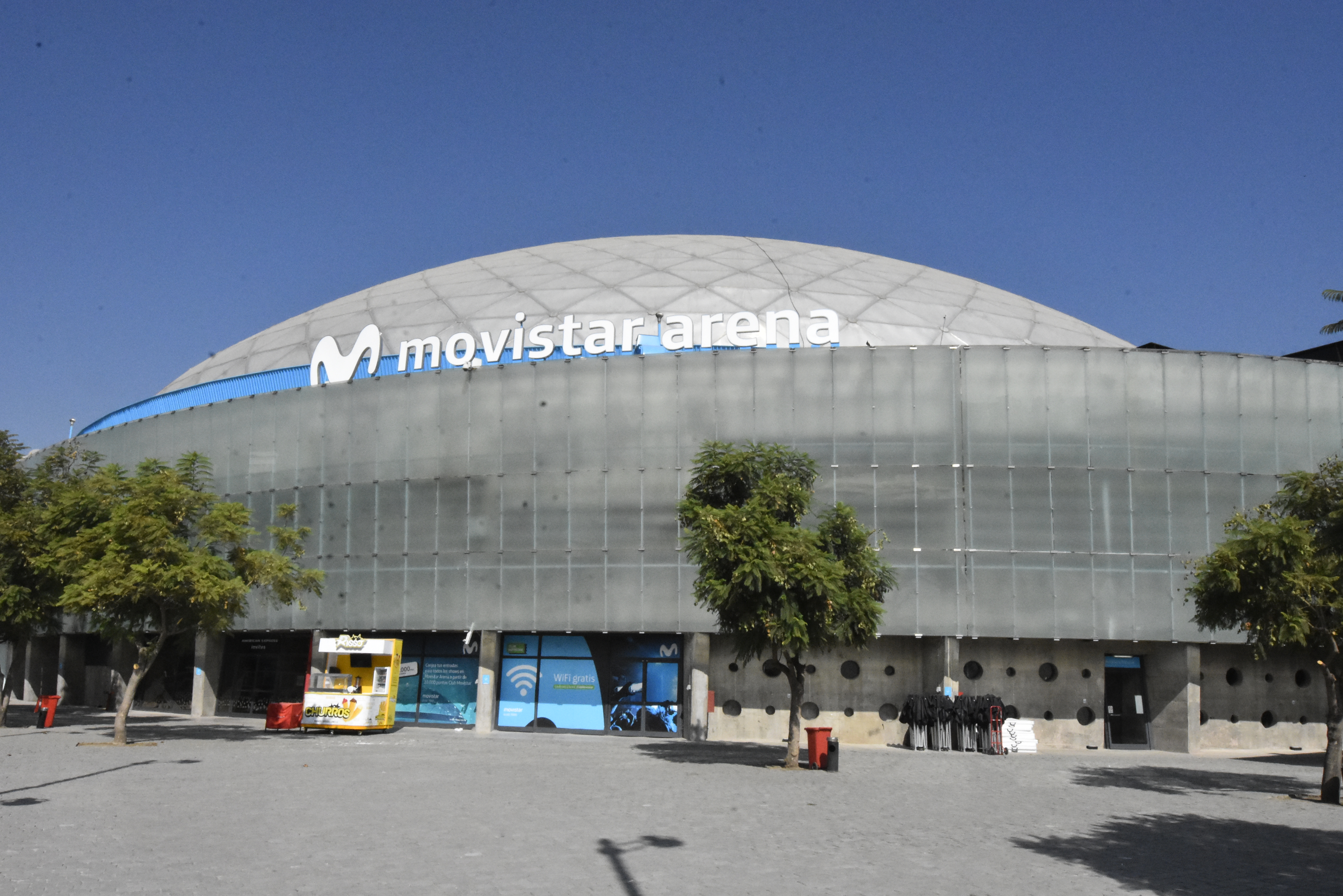
Movistar Arena

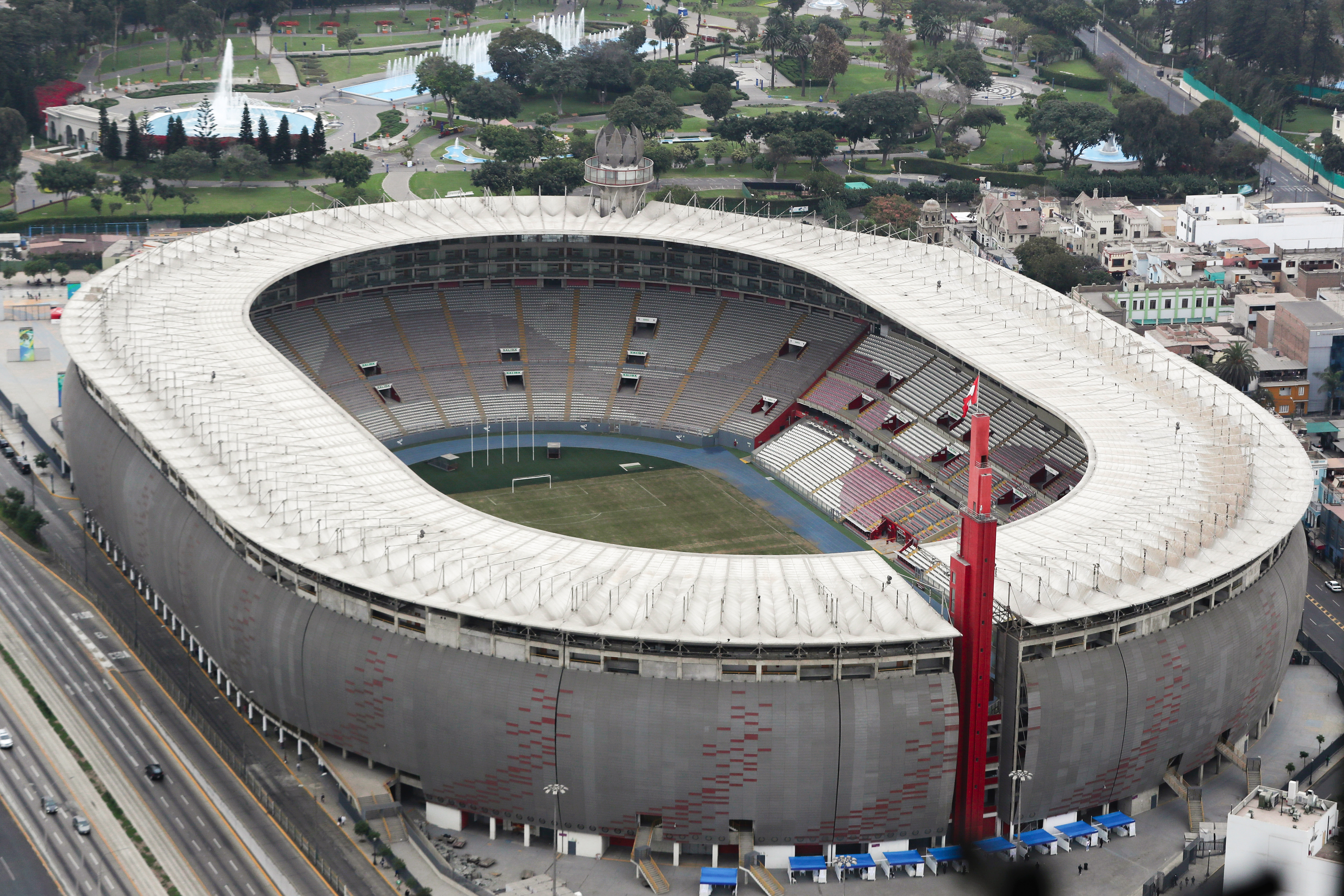
National Stadium of Peru

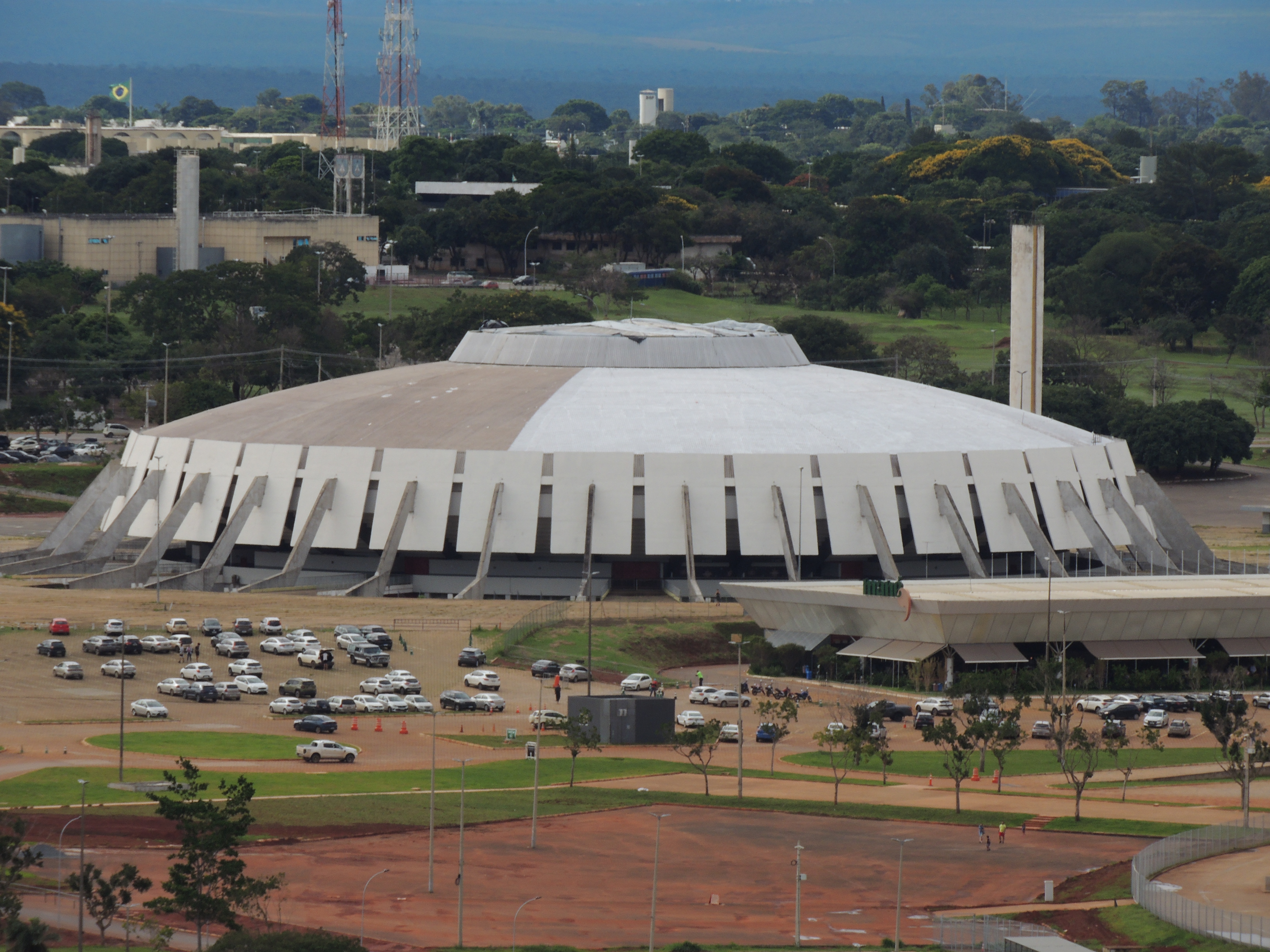
Nilson Nelson Gymnasium

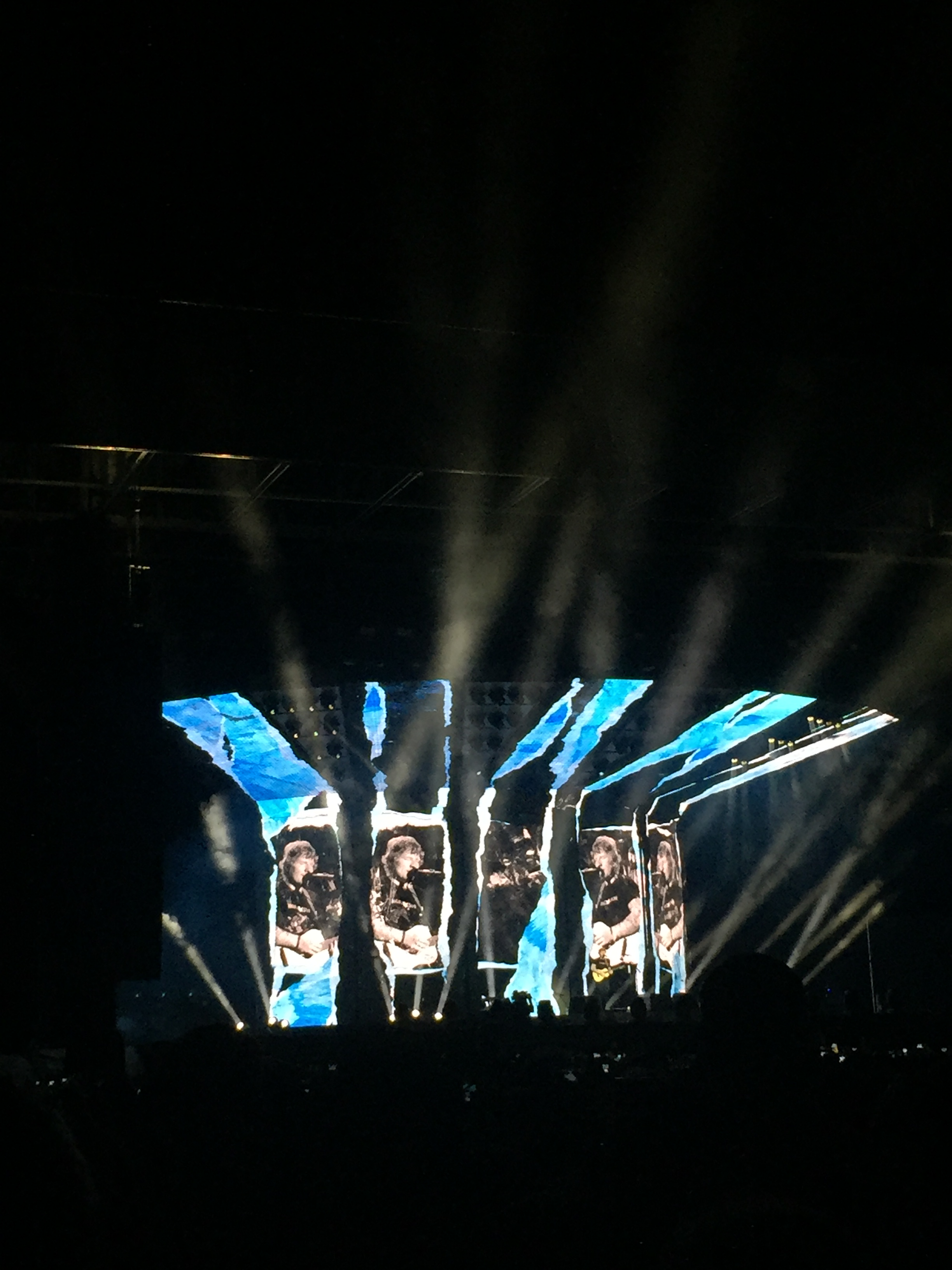
Pedreira Paulo Leminski

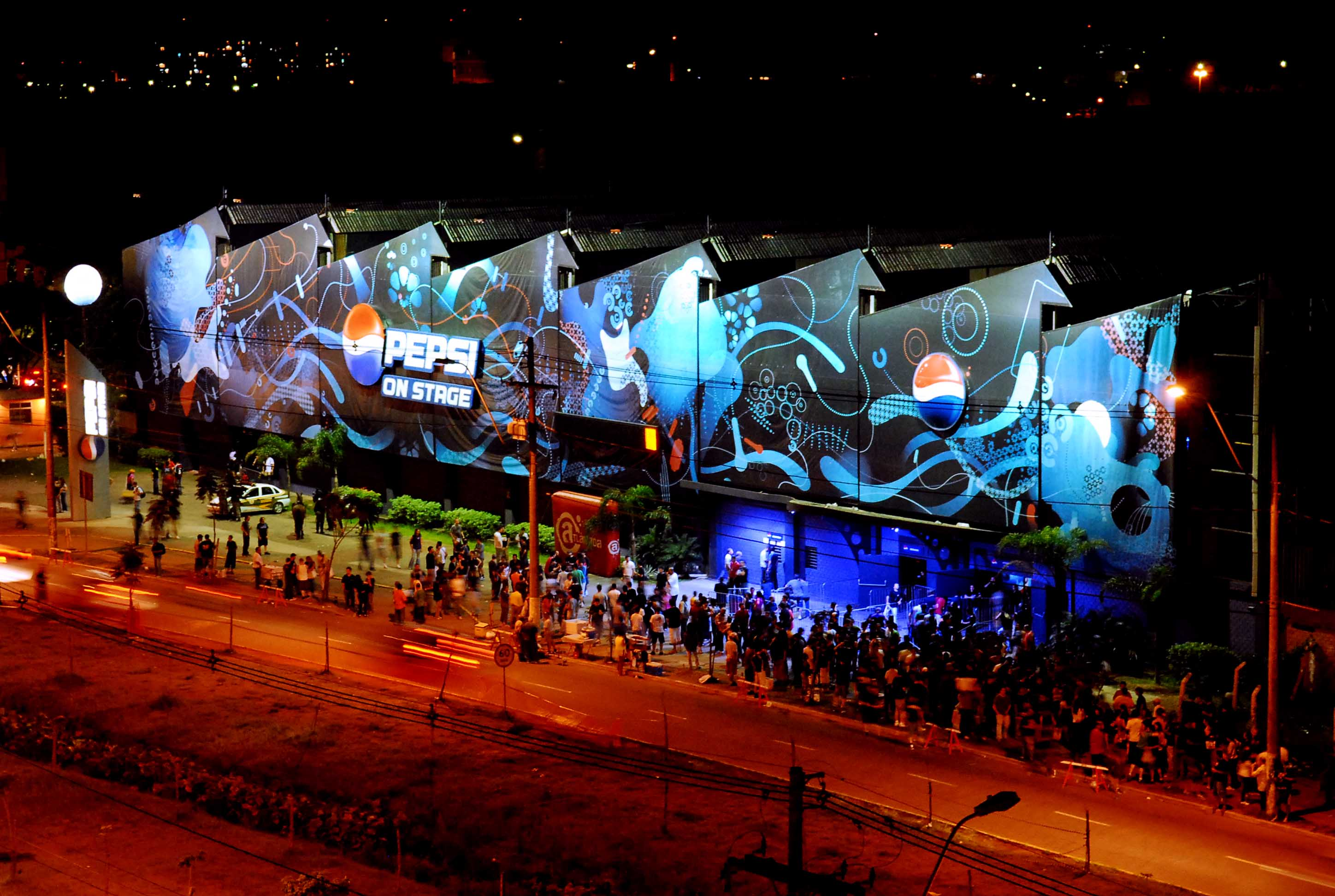
Pepsi on Stage

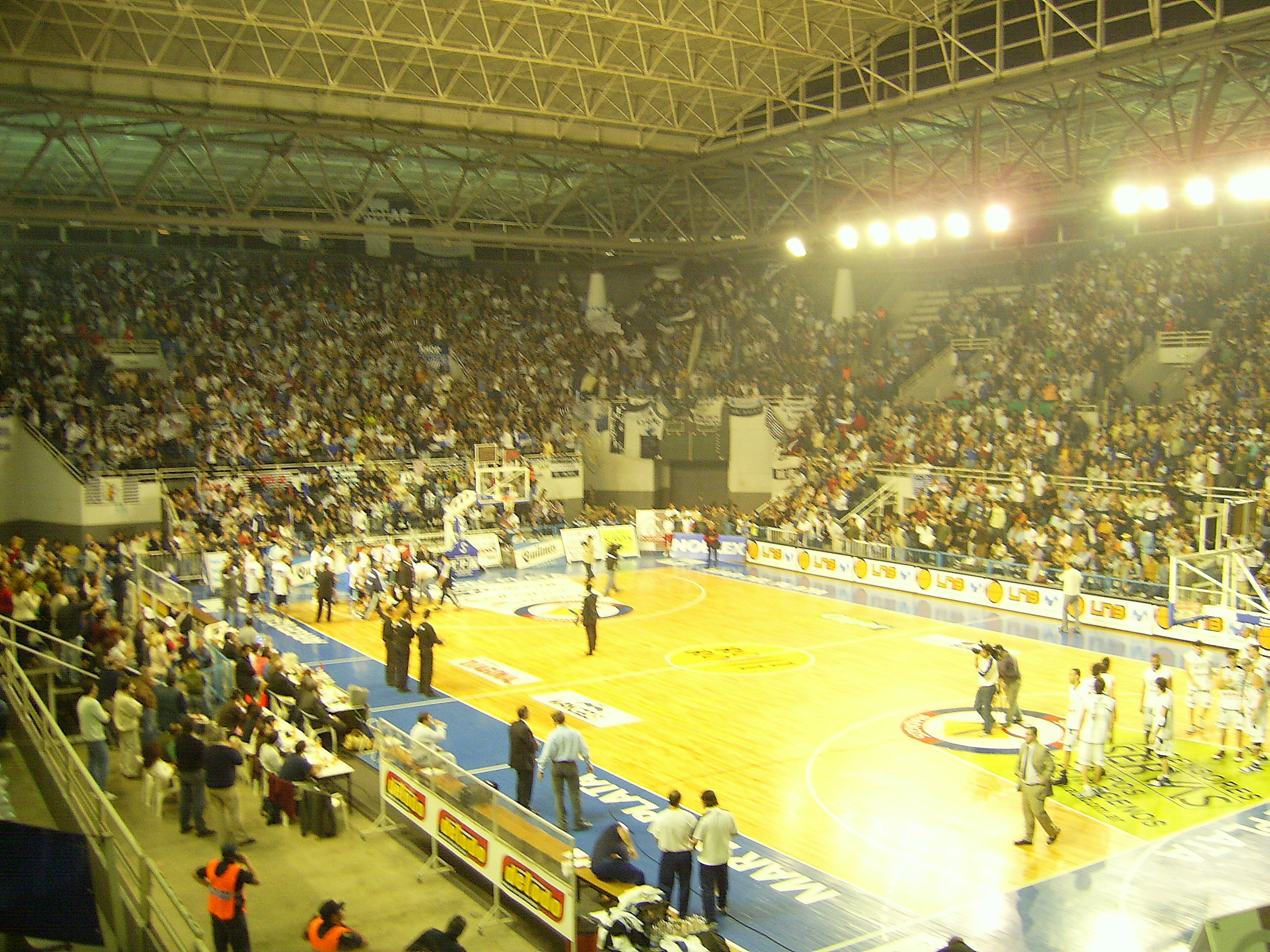
Polideportivo Islas Malvinas

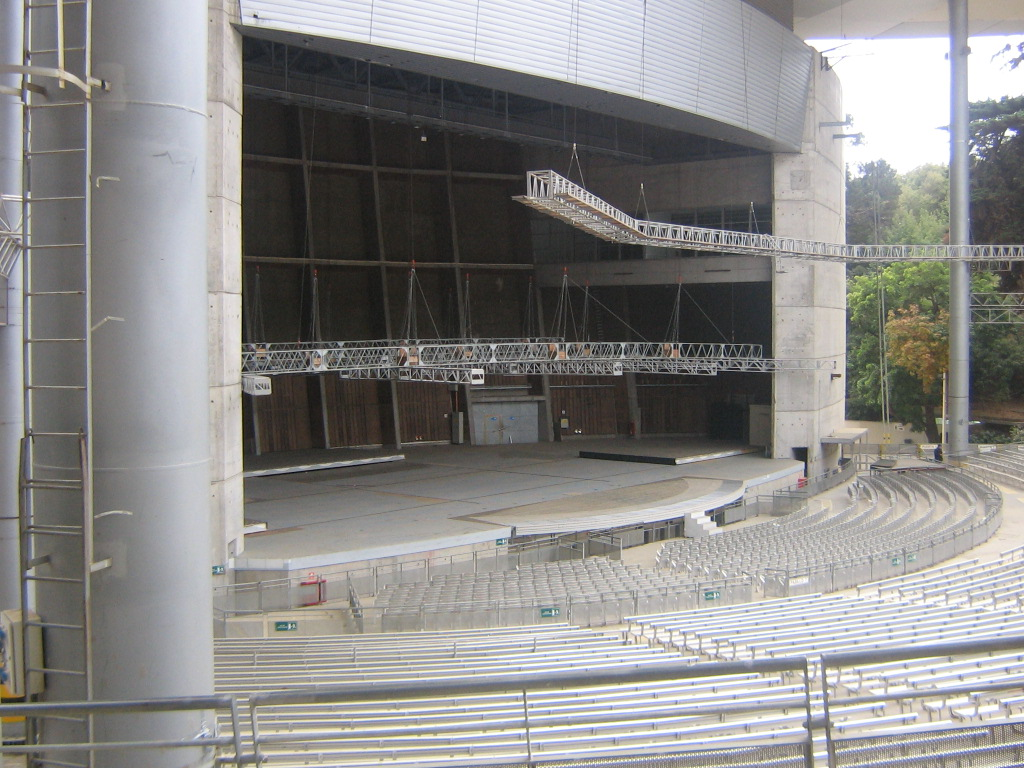
Quinta Vergara Amphitheater

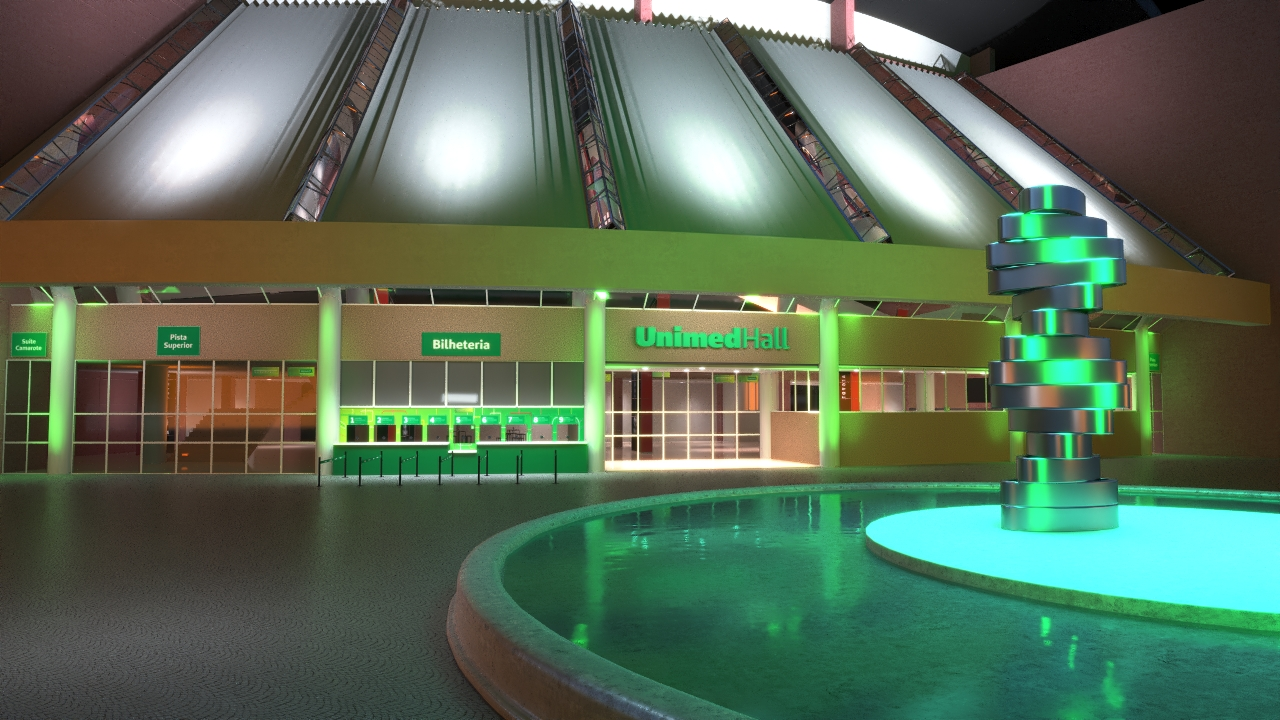
Vibra São Paulo
