= Funan (disambiguation) =

Funan was an ancient state in mainland Southeast Asia.

Funan may also refer to:

Buildings

- Funan DigitaLife Mall, demolished shopping mall in Singapore
- Funan, Singapore, current shopping mall in Singapore

Films

- Funan (film), a 2018 animated drama film directed by Denis Do.

Regions

- Funan County, Anhui, China

Others

- local Xiang Chinese pronunciation of Hunan
