= Sideshow (disambiguation) =

A sideshow is an extra, secondary production associated with a circus, carnival or fair etc.

Sideshow or Side Show may also refer to:

== Brands and computing ==
- Windows SideShow, a Microsoft technology for Windows Vista
- Sideshow Collectibles, a California-based designer toy and collectible studio
- Sideshow, the film production and distribution company of Ramin Niami

== Films and theatre ==
- The Sideshow (film), a 1928 American silent drama film
- The Side Show, 1929 Vitaphone sound short directed by Doc Salomon
- Side Show (musical), a 1997 Broadway musical
- Sideshow (1950 film), an American crime film
- Sideshow (2000 film), a horror film
- Side Show (film), a 1931 musical comedy film
- Sideshow, a 1974 play by Miguel Piñero

== Music ==
- The Side Show (nightclub), Cape Town, South Africa.
- Sideshow, a 2004 comedy album by The Bob and Tom Show
- Sideshow (album), a 1992 album by 8 Bold Souls
- "Sideshow" (song), a 1974 song by Blue Magic
- "Sideshow", a 1994 song by Alice Cooper from the album The Last Temptation

== Television ==
- Sideshow Bob, a character from The Simpsons
- Sideshow Mel, Bob's replacement in The Simpsons
- The Sideshow (TV series), an Australian comedy/variety TV show
- Sideshow, a shapechanging superhero from Milestone Comics
- The Side Show Countdown with Nikki Sixx

== Other ==
- Sideshow alley, an Australian term for amusements
- Sideshow (automobile exhibition) or street takeover, illegal events to perform automotive stunts, originated in California
- Sideshow: Kissinger, Nixon and the Destruction of Cambodia, a 1979 book by William Shawcross
