= Lists of music venues =

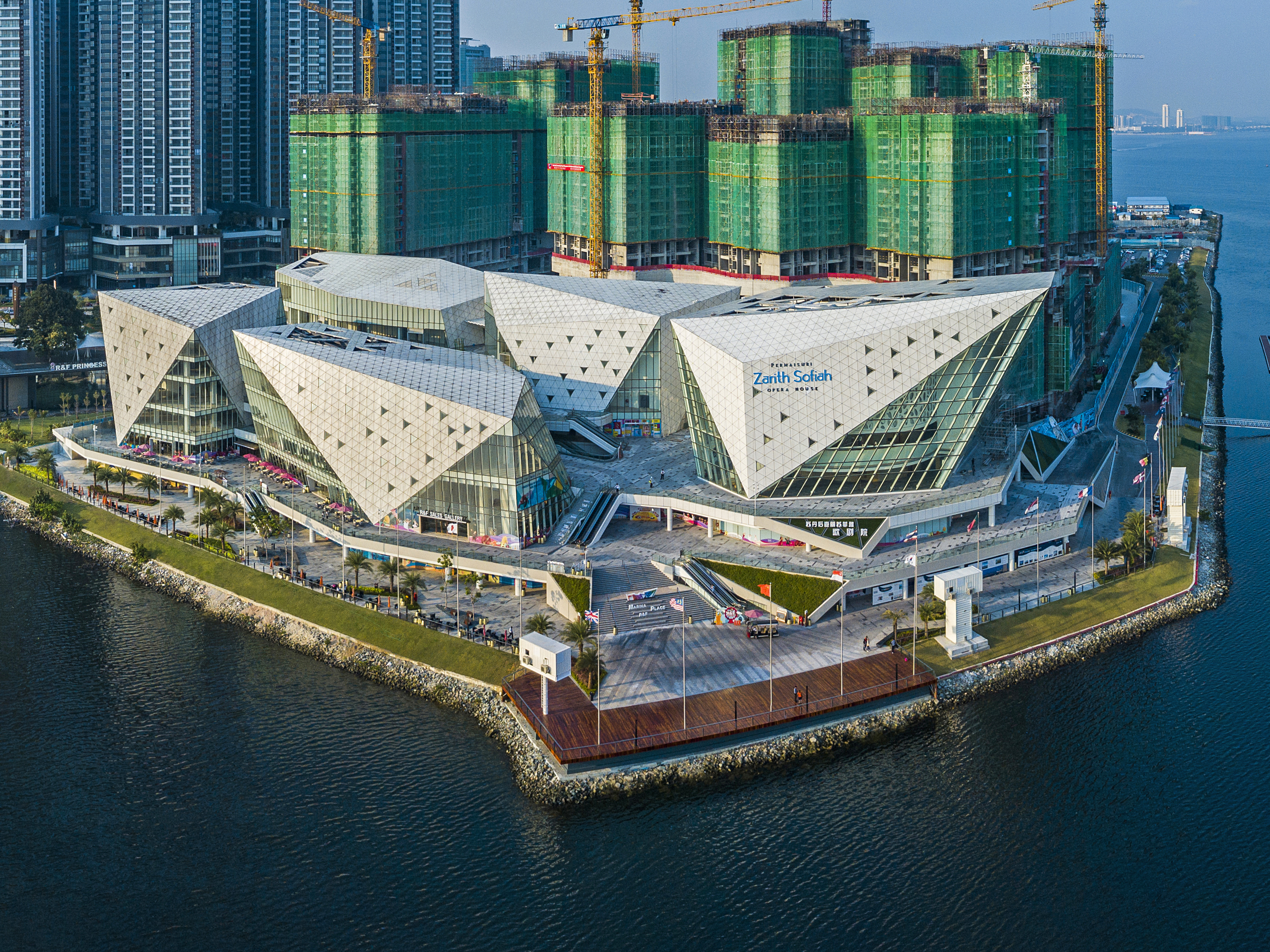
Permaisuri Zarith Sofiah Opera House, a major music venue in Johor Bahru, Malaysia

This is a list of lists of some notable music venues worldwide.

== Lists ==
- Asia
  - Singapore
- Oceania
  - Australia
    - Melbourne
- North America
  - Canada
    - Toronto
    - Montreal
  - United States
    - San Antonio
    - Portland, Oregon
    - Denver
    - Greater Los Angeles
- South America
- Europe
  - Netherlands
- Africa

== See also ==
- Lists of sports venues
- Lists of stadiums
