= Paradise Group Holdings =

Singapore-based restaurant group

- Industry: Restaurant
- Founded: Singapore (2002)
- Headquarters: Singapore
- Number of locations: 48 in Singapore, 63 overseas
- Area served: Singapore; Malaysia; Indonesia; Hong Kong; China; Japan; Taiwan; Philippines; Myanmar; United States; Vietnam
- Website: www.paradisegp.com

Paradise Group Holdings Pte Ltd is a Singapore-based restaurant group incorporated in 2002 by Eldwin Chua and Edlan Chua. The company's restaurants serve a variety of Chinese cuisine. Their brands include Taste Paradise, Paradise Teochew, Seafood Paradise, Beauty in the Pot, Beauty Zi Zi, Paradise Dynasty, Canton Paradise, Canton Paradise (China) Paradise Classic, Lèten, Paradise Hotpot, ParaPara Hotpot, ParaThai, Le Shrimp Raman, LeNu Chef’s Wai Noodle Bar, LE Congee & Noodle Bar, and LeMa Dumpling. As of 2021, the company operates restaurants in its home country of Singapore, as well as in Malaysia, Indonesia, China, and the United States.

== History ==
Paradise Group Holdings opened its first restaurant, Seafood Paradise, in 2002 at Defu Lane industrial estate in Singapore. Three more Seafood Paradise outlets were later opened in Singapore.

In 2006, the group opened Taste Paradise in Chinatown, and in 2009, it moved to its current location at ION Orchard shopping mall. That year the group launched the first outlet of Paradise Inn at Funan DigitaLife Mall.

In 2010, the group launched One Paradise, their catering arm, and also Paradise Dynasty, at ION Orchard, serving upscale northern and southern Chinese dishes. Paradise Pavilion also opened in 2010 at Marina Bay Financial Centre, offering Peking duck and modern Chinese cuisine. The Paradise Group also launched KungFu Paradise, an all-day café with both eastern and western dishes aimed at the younger crowd.

In December 2011, Paradise Group embarked on another eatery, Canton Paradise which is a Hong Kong-style eatery offering Cantonese, Shunde cuisine and dim sum.

In 2012, Paradise took part in a government-sponsored study designed to improved productivity in the restaurant industry. The resulting efficiency helped the company double its earnings that year to $50 million. Also in 2012, the company collaborated with Chaswood Resources to develop restaurants in Thailand.

By 2014, Paradise Group Holdings was operating 34 restaurants, but faced charges in Singapore of tampering with the gas meters at 24 of them. In 2016, they were found guilty of 29 out of the 33 charges of using $640,000 worth of gas without paying. In addition to repaying City Gas for the gas they had fraudulently used, the group was fined $530,000, lower than $610,000 that was asked for by the Energy Market Authority, higher than the $37,000-$95,000 that was asked for by its defence lawyer.

In spite of this, the company continued to open new restaurants. In 2015, the group's Malaysian subsidiary opened its first Thai restaurant in Malaysia. In 2021, the group's first restaurants in the United States (and first outside Asia) opened: a Paradise Dynasty and a Le Shrimp Ramen, both at South Coast Plaza in Costa Mesa, California.

== Awards ==
- Entrepreneur of the Year 2011
- Singapore Prestige Brand Award 2011
- SME1 Asia Awards 2011
- Enterprise 50 Award 2011
- Epicurean Star Award 2011
