= List of arts and entertainment venues in Singapore =

This is a list of music venues in Singapore.

== List ==
Concert halls / theatres
Location	Venue	Facility	Type	Year built	Seats	Resident organisations
Boon Lay	Nanyang Technological University	Nanyang Auditorium	Concert hall		1,729	
Buona Vista	The Star Performing Arts Centre	The Star Theatre	Theatre	2012	5,000	New Creation Church
Bukit Merah	Gateway Theatre	Theatre	Theatre	2016	922	
Bukit Merah	Gateway Theatre	Blackbox	Theatre	2016	207	
Clementi	Singapore Institute of Management	Performing Arts Theatre	Theatre		458	
Downtown Core	Marina Bay Sands	The Sands Theatre	Theatre	2010	1,680	
Downtown Core	Marina Bay Sands	The Grand Theatre	Theatre	2010	2,155	
Downtown Core	Esplanade - Theatres on the Bay	Esplanade Concert Hall	Concert hall	2002	1,811	Singapore Symphony Orchestra
Downtown Core	Esplanade - Theatres on the Bay	Esplanade Theatre	Theatre	2002	1,942	
Downtown Core	Singapore Conference Hall	SCO Concert Hall	Concert hall	1965	918	Singapore Chinese Orchestra
Downtown Core	The Arts House at the Old Parliament	The Chamber		2004 (Refurbished)	200	
Downtown Core	Victoria Theatre and Concert Hall	Victoria Concert Hall	Concert hall	1905	883	Singapore Symphony Orchestra
Downtown Core	Victoria Theatre and Concert Hall	Victoria Theatre	Theatre	1905	904	
Downtown Core	Funan, Singapore	The Ngee Ann Kongsi Theatre	Theatre	2019	358	W!LD RICE
Hougang	Paya Lebar Methodist Girls' School (Secondary)	Concert Hall	Concert hall	2010	711	
Museum	School of the Arts, Singapore	Concert Hall	Concert hall	2011	708	
Museum	School of the Arts, Singapore	Drama Theatre	Theatre	2011	423	
Novena	Anglo-Chinese School (Barker Road)	Mrs Lee Choon Guan Concert Hall	Concert hall	2003	830	
Queenstown	National University of Singapore	Yong Siew Toh Conservatory of Music Concert Hall	Concert hall	2006	600	The Conservatory Orchestra
Queenstown	National University of Singapore	Yong Siew Toh Conservatory of Music Orchestra Hall	Concert hall	2006	150	
Queenstown	National University of Singapore	University Cultural Centre Hall	Concert hall	2000	1,714	NUS Symphony Orchestra
Queenstown	National University of Singapore	University Cultural Centre Theatre	Theatre	2000	450	
Queenstown	National University of Singapore	NUS Theatrette (Lecture Theatre 13)	Theatre		303	
Queenstown	Anglo-Chinese Junior College	Mrs Lee Choon Guan Theatre	Theatre	2008	454	
Rochor	Nanyang Academy of Fine Arts	Lee Foundation Theatre	Theatre	2004	380	
Southern Islands	Resorts World Sentosa	Festive Grand Theatre	Theatre	2010	1,600	Voyage de la Vie
Toa Payoh	Catholic Junior College	Performing Arts Centre (PAC)	Theatre	2005	750	Tan Jek Suan

Large-scaled locations / stadiums
Location	Venue	Facility	Type	Date built	Seats	Resident organisations
Kallang	National Stadium, Singapore	National Stadium, Singapore	Arena/stadium	2010	55,000	Singapore national football team Singapore national cricket team Southeast Asian Games ASEAN Para Games Sunwolves
Kallang	Singapore Indoor Stadium	Singapore Indoor Stadium	Indoor stadium		12,000	WTA Finals International Premier Tennis League
