= Teddington Studios =

British television studio in Teddington, London

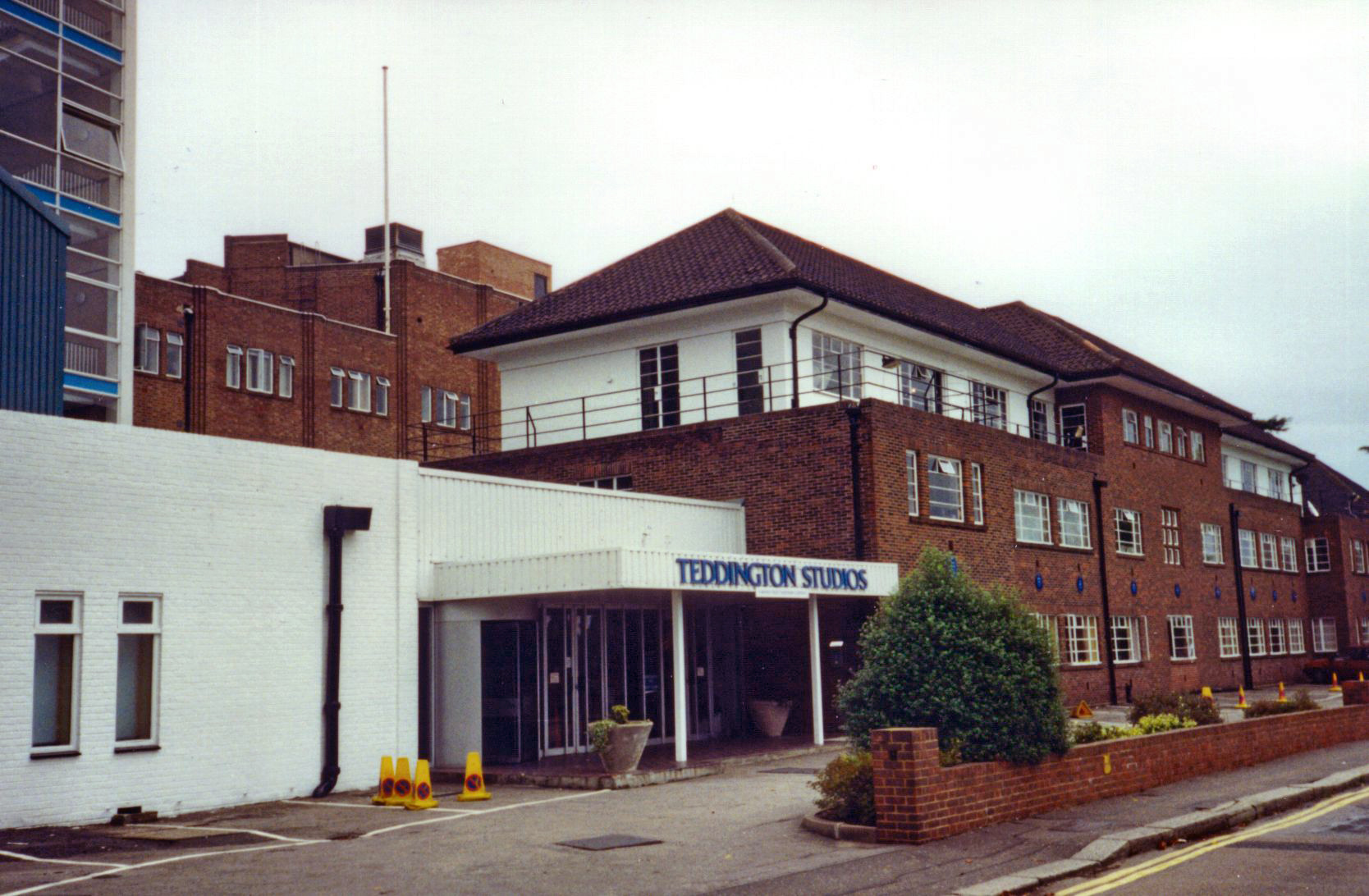
- Teddington Studios

- Location within Greater London Location within London Borough of Richmond upon Thames

General information
- Status: Demolished
- Type: Television studios
- Location: Broom Road, Teddington, London, England
- Coordinates: 51.4287°N 0.3217°W
- Completed: 1910s
- Demolished: February 2016
- Cost: £2.7m (2005)
- Owner: Warner Bros. (1931–1958); ABC Weekend TV (1958–1968); Thames Television (1968–1993); Teddington Studios (leased: 1993–2005); Pinewood Studios Group (leased: 2005–2014)

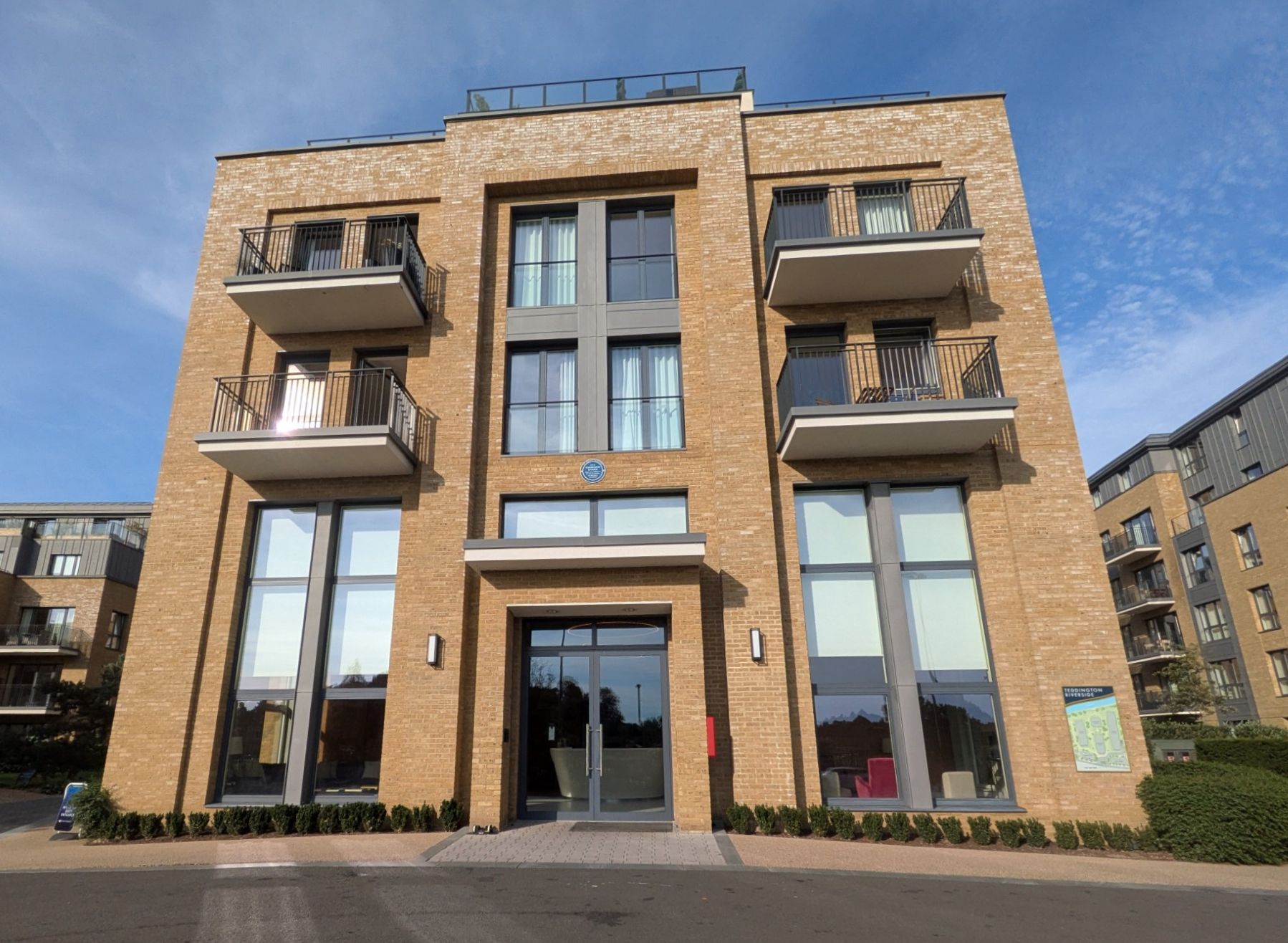
Apartment block facing Broom Road, on the site of the former studios. A blue plaque above the main entrance commemorates the studios

Teddington Studios was a large British television studio in Teddington, London Borough of Richmond upon Thames, providing studio facilities for programmes airing on the BBC, ITV, Channel 4, Channel 5, Sky One and others. The complex also provided studio space for channel continuity. Towards the end of its history the site was run by the Pinewood Studios Group.

Originally built as film studios, the studios were the main production centres for the ITV franchisees ABC Weekend TV and Thames Television.

Pinewood Group's lease on Teddington Studios expired in 2014. The studios were demolished in February 2016 to be turned into housing, with programmes made there having moved to other facilities. The studio buildings have now been replaced by four modern apartment blocks and other smaller houses.

== History ==
=== Film studios ===
The studio began in the early 20th century as film studios when stockbroker Henry Chinnery, owner of Weir House, Teddington, allowed filmmakers to use his greenhouse as a studio. Dedicated studio facilities were then built in the 1910s. The studio was greatly expanded by a partnership of filmmaker E. G. Norman and actor Henry Edwards, and renamed Teddington Film Studios Limited in 1931.

After only one production, Stranglehold (1931), the studio was acquired by Warner Bros. to turn out so-called "quota quickies" – British-made films which fulfilled a legal quota (created by the Cinematograph Films Act 1927) before American-made films could be shown. Warner Bros.-First National continued to make US/UK coproductions at Teddington until The Dark Tower (1943). One Teddington Studios production Murder at Monte Carlo (1934) with Errol Flynn in his first major film role, is considered a lost film. The studio was seriously damaged in a V-1 attack in July 1944, in which Jack L. Warner's studio manager, and family member, Doc Salomon was killed while recording the attack.

=== Television studios ===
By the 1950s the studio's fortunes had declined, but in 1958 it was bought by ABC Weekend TV for use as a television studio. Although this was outside its contract areas of the Midlands and the north of England, ABC wanted a London base, as many performers could not venture outside of the capital to record programmes because they were often committed to runs of theatre plays in the West End.

By the time ABC's contracts expired in 1968, the Teddington studios were highly desirable, as they had participated in colour experiments and were already partially converted, and as such had been sought after by both Thames Television and LWT, London's two new franchisees. ABC's parent company had a 51% stake in Thames, and so Teddington Studios became the main production centre for Thames's entertainment programming (e.g. gameshows, children's programmes, dramas and comedy), while documentary shows, news and sports programming were made at Thames's Euston Road headquarters.

After Thames lost its ITV franchise to Carlton Television in 1993, the studio became independent. Without a major broadcaster or studio group owning the studios, their future was questioned (as Carlton was going to commission most of its entertainment programming from independent producers), but it survived and stayed independent for 13 years, when in 2005, the Pinewood Studios Group bought the complex for £2.7 million. Teddington was also the home of British TV Casino show Smart Live Casino until they moved to Piccadilly Studios.

The media company Haymarket owned the Teddington Studios site from 2004 and occupied some of it from 2006. Part of the site was leased to Pinewood until 2014. Haymarket announced in June 2013 that it planned to redevelop the site into homes, meaning the end of Teddington Studios. In February 2016 it was reported that the site was being demolished to make way for a 213-flat development, the land having been sold to Singaporean firm City Developers for a reputed £80 million.

== TV studios and facilities ==
The site consisted of 8 studios in total, as well as post-production editing facilities.

=== Studio 1 ===
Studio 1 was Teddington's largest studio at nearly 8,900 square feet (827 m^{2}). It was a fully digital widescreen studio, with audience seating for 500, making it popular for programmes such as Harry Hill's TV Burp for ITV and sitcoms The Green Green Grass, After You've Gone, My Family, My Hero, Reggie Perrin and Not Going Out (all for BBC One).

Other notable productions made in Studio 1 included Pop Idol (ITV), Birds of a Feather (BBC and ITV), one series of Parkinson and Black Books (Channel 4).

Historically, many classic series were recorded in Studio 1. These include The Benny Hill Show, all of Tommy Cooper's shows produced by Thames Television (1973–1980), The Sooty Show, George and Mildred, Man About the House and long-running light entertainment series such as This is Your Life and Opportunity Knocks. The final four series of The Morecambe & Wise Show were also produced at Teddington's Studio 1 by Thames Television. The first three series of The Avengers were made at Teddington between 1961 and 1964, the later episodes in Studio 1 and earlier episodes in Studio 2.

=== Studio 2 ===
Studio 2 measured nearly 5,700 square feet (530 m^{2}) and has been the home to shows such as the early series of The Sooty Show, Today with Des and Mel for ITV, Kilroy for the BBC and the first series of Trisha after moving to Channel 5. This studio was popular for programmes which required intimate medium-sized space, like Bremner, Bird and Fortune for Channel 4.

=== Studio 3 ===
Studio 3 was a much smaller studio at 2,098 square feet (195 m^{2}) and was home to many music shows' productions and television commercials. It was also the regular studio used for Rainbow.

=== Studio 4 ===
Studio 4 was a small studio at 1,475 square feet (137 m^{2}). CBeebies used the studio before moving back to BBC Television Centre in 2010 and then moving to MediaCityUK in 2011.

=== Studio 5 ===
Another small studio, Studio 5 was home to The Chinese Channel.

=== Studio 6 ===
Until early 2008, this was a small studio at 594 square feet (55 m^{2}).

=== Studio 7 ===
Built on the site of the prop store for Studio 2, this small studio was built within weeks for participation TV channel Quiz Call, whose content is produced using widescreen cameras. The studio has been used for Dick and Dom's Funny Business and sitcom Starlings for Sky One.

=== Studio 8 ===
This studio, also small, was the home of High Flyer which produced the TV channel Racing UK.

=== Weir Cottage ===
At the entrance of the studio stood the early 19th-century Weir Cottage. The cottage was the original lock keeper's cottage for the Teddington Lock, and is thought to have been built between 1825 and 1850, originally separate from the large mansion that occupied the site of the Studios, Weir House. The Cottage known variously as "the Lock-keeper's Cottage" and "Weir Cottage" ceased to be used for its original function sometime before 1870, when images show the two new cabins on the opposite side of the Thames having been constructed and put to use.

With two gabled ends and a turret, the Cottage was redesigned in 1905 in the Victorian Arts and Crafts style, taking inspiration from the nearby Strawberry Hill House. A map from 1873 showed the narrow cottage plot with a long garden extending to the river. The Cottage was subsequently purchased sometime prior to the 1960s expansion of Teddington Studios, which moved the vehicular entrance to between the Cottage and Studio 3.

Upon the sale of the site in the 2010s the Cottage was in poor condition, but given its unique architecture, it was notably preserved upon demolition of the Studio site. The Cottage has been restored and once again serves as a private residence, abutting the Teddington Riverside development.

=== Other facilities ===
Like many studios, Teddington also included set and prop storage, green rooms, wardrobe and makeup and provided car parking. However, many businesses were based at Teddington, providing products/services that catered for all production needs.

An office within the facilities was used to film The Office.

== See also ==
- Category:Films shot at Teddington Studios
- Category:Television shows shot at Teddington Studios
