= List of music venues in Africa =

This is a list of music venues in Africa. Venues with a capacity of 1,000 or higher are included.

== List ==
=== Algeria ===
Opened	Venue	City	Capacity
1975	Salle de Sports de Algiers	Algiers	7,000
June 17, 1972	Stade du 5 Juillet	Algiers	64,200

=== Angola ===
Opened	Venue	City	Capacity
2013	Pavilhão Multiusos do Kilamba	Luanda	12,750
June 10, 1972	Estádio da Cidadela	Luanda	40,000

=== Democratic Republic of the Congo ===
Opened	Venue	City	Capacity
September 14, 1994	Stade des Martyrs	Kinshasa	80,000
1952	Stade Tata Raphaël	Kinshasa	60,000

=== Egypt ===
Opened	Venue	City	Capacity
2007	Borg El Arab Stadium	Alexandria	86,000
1991	The Covered Hall	Cairo	20,000
1960	Cairo International Stadium	Cairo	74,100
2600 BCE	Giza Plateau	Giza	100,000
2010	Space Sharm	Sharm El Sheikh	10,000
2018	Seacode Beach Club	El Alamein	~2,000

=== Ethiopia ===
Opened	Venue	City	Capacity
2015	Bahir Dar Stadium	Bahir Dar	60,000
2015	Hawassa Kenema Stadium	Hawassa	60,000
2017	Tigray Stadium	Mekelle	60,000

=== Ivory Coast ===
Opened	Venue	City	Capacity
October 3, 2020	National Stadium of the Ivory Coast	Abidjan	60,012

=== Kenya ===
Opened	Venue	City	Capacity
August 1987	Kasarani Indoor Arena	Nairobi	5,000
August 1987	Kasarani Stadium	Nairobi	80,000

=== Libya ===
Opened	Venue	City	Capacity
1970	Tripoli Stadium	Tripoli	67,000

=== Morocco ===
Opened	Venue	City	Capacity
Unknown	Hippodrome Casa-Anfa	Casablanca	5,000
1981	Salle Mohammed V	Casablanca	5,000
March 6, 1955	Stade Mohammed V	Casablanca	45,891
November 25, 2007	Fez Stadium	Fez	45,000
January 5, 2011	Stade de Marrakech	Marrakesh	45,240
April 26, 2011	Ibn Batouta Stadium	Tangier	68,000

=== Malawi ===
Opened	Venue	City	Capacity
1964	Mogadishu Stadium	Blantyre	20,000

=== Mauritius ===
Opened	Venue	City	Capacity
2011	J&J Auditorium	Vacoas-Phoenix	Unknown

=== Nigeria ===
Opened	Venue	City	Capacity
Federal Capital Territory
2003	Moshood Abiola National Stadium	Abuja	60,491
Kano State
1998	Sani Abacha Stadium	Kano	25,000
Lagos State
2000	New Afrika Shrine	Ikeja	2,500
Unknown	Queens Park Events Center	Lagos	2,100

=== Republic of the Congo ===
Opened	Venue	City	Capacity
Unknown	Palais des Sports	Brazzaville	10,134
2015	Stade Municipal de Kintélé	Brazzaville	60,000

=== Rwanda ===
Opened	Venue	City	Capacity
2019	BK Arena	Kigali	10,000

=== Senegal ===
Opened	Venue	City	Capacity
circa 1985	Léopold Senghor Stadium	Dakar	60,000

=== Somalia ===
Opened	Venue	City	Capacity
1977	Mogadishu Stadium	Mogadishu	65,000

=== South Africa ===
Opened	Venue	City	Capacity
Eastern Cape
June 6, 2009	Nelson Mandela Bay Stadium	Gqeberha	46,000
Free State
1995	Toyota Stadium	Bloemfontein	40,911
Gauteng
1999	Big Top Arena	Brakpan	5,000
1995	Centurion Park	Centurion	22,000
November 4, 2017	SunBet Arena	Pretoria	8,500
1923	Loftus Versfeld Stadium	Arcadia	51,762
November 2007	Teatro	Sandton	1,870
1992	Johannesburg Stadium	Doornfontein	37,500
1990	Ellis Park Arena	Johannesburg	6,300
1928	Ellis Park Stadium	Johannesburg	62,567
1989	FNB Stadium	Soweto	94,736
May 2, 1959	Orlando Stadium	Soweto	37,313
KwaZulu-Natal
2007	ICC Durban Arena	Durban	10,000
November 27, 2009	Moses Mabhida Stadium	Durban	55,500
1958	Hollywoodbets Kings Park Stadium	Durban	60,000
Limpopo
August 4, 1995	Oppikoppi Farm	Northam	20,000
Mpumalanga
December 2000	Blue Moon	Mbombela	2,000
North West
1979	Sun City Super Bowl	Sun City	~6,000
Northern Cape
February 15, 2012	Mittah Seperepere Convention Centre	Kimberley	2,500
Western Cape
December 14, 2009	DHL Stadium	Green Point	58,310
1997	Bellville Velodrome	Bellville	10,000
May 19, 1971	Artscape Opera House	Cape Town	1,487
June 2003	Cape Town International Convention Centre	Cape Town	1,500
Unknown	The Side Show	Cape Town	1,800
October 2007	GrandWest Grand Arena	Cape Town	7,000
1888	DHL Newlands	Cape Town	52,000
c. 1915	Cycad Amphitheatre	Cape Town	Unknown

=== Tanzania ===
Opened	Venue	City	Capacity
2007	National Stadium	Dar es Salaam	60,000

=== Tunisia ===
Opened	Venue	City	Capacity
December 27, 2015	Hard Rock Cafe	Hammam Sousse	Unknown
2004	Salle Omnisport de Radès	Radès	17,000
1967	Stade El Menzah	Tunis	39,858

=== Zimbabwe ===
Opened	Venue	City	Capacity
Unknown	City Sports Center	Harare	4,000
Unknown	Harare International Conference Center	Harare	4,500
1892	Borrowdale Racecourse	Harare	5,000
1987	National Sports Stadium	Harare	80,000

== Gallery ==
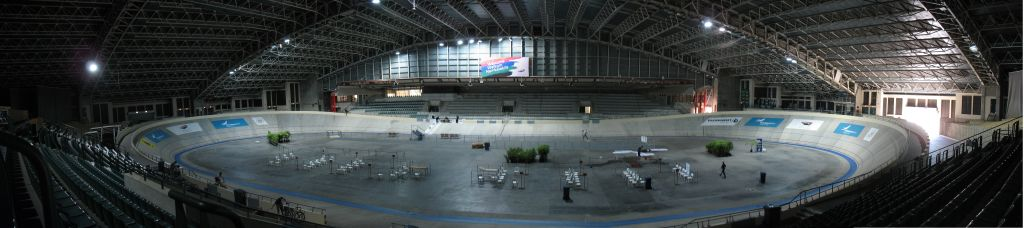
Bellville Velodrome

Cape Town Stadium

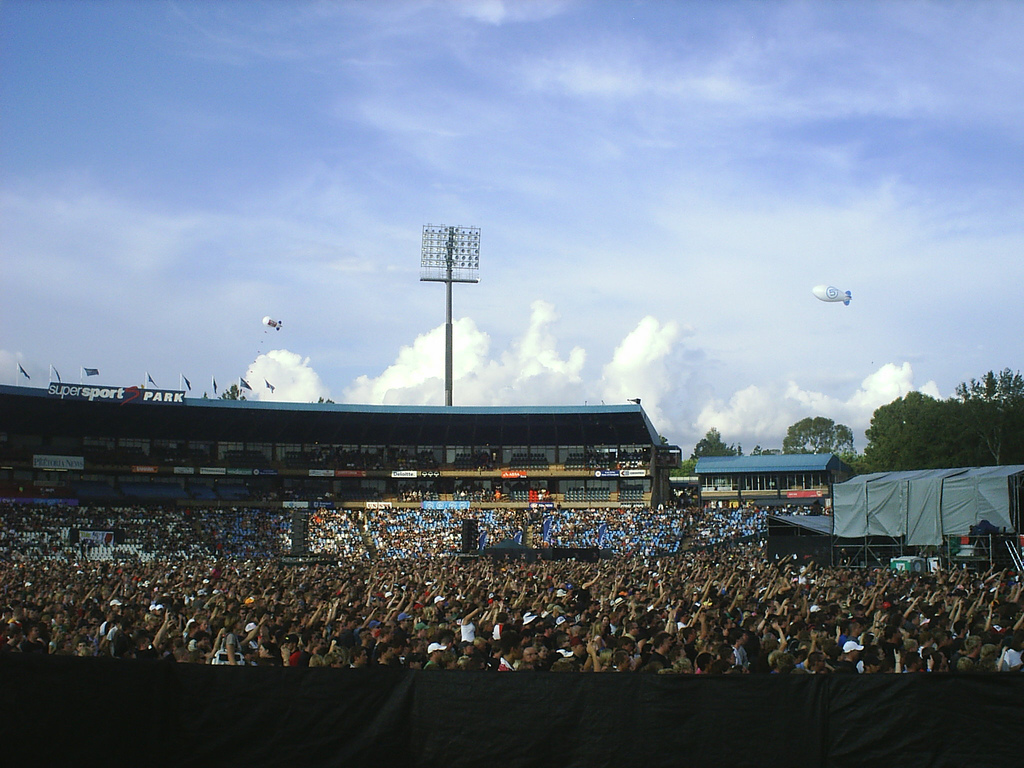
Centurion Park

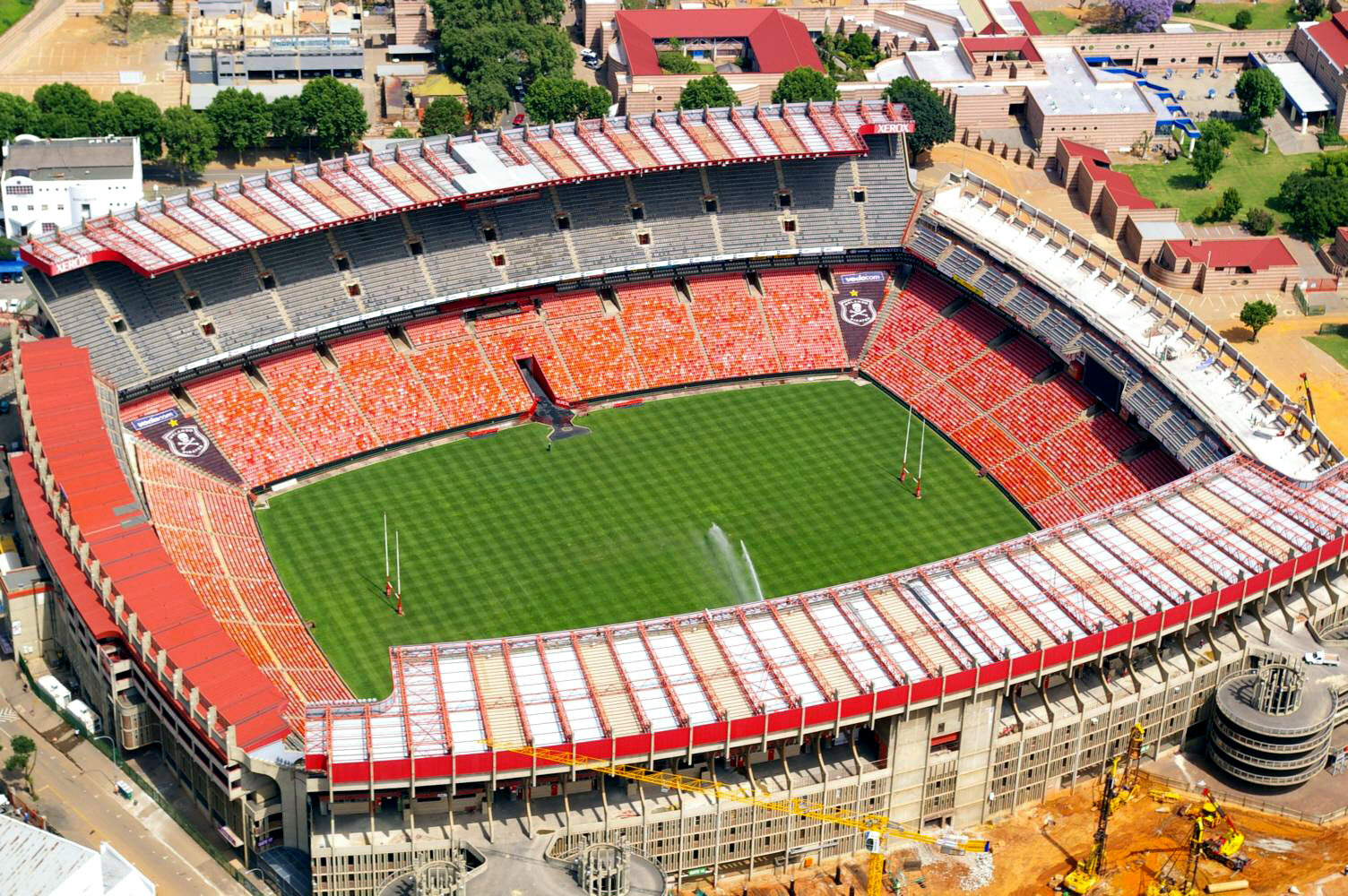
Ellis Park Stadium

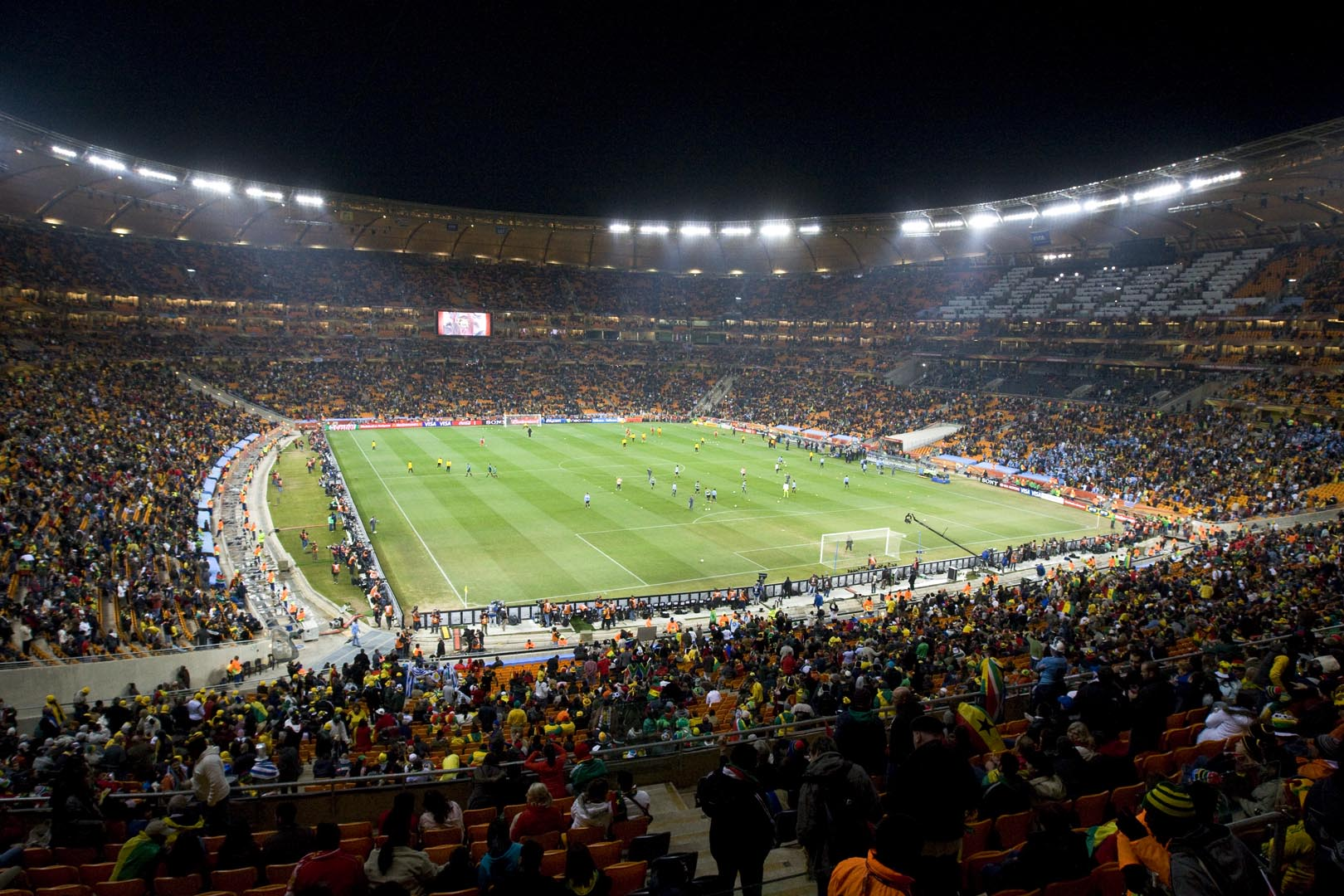
FNB Stadium

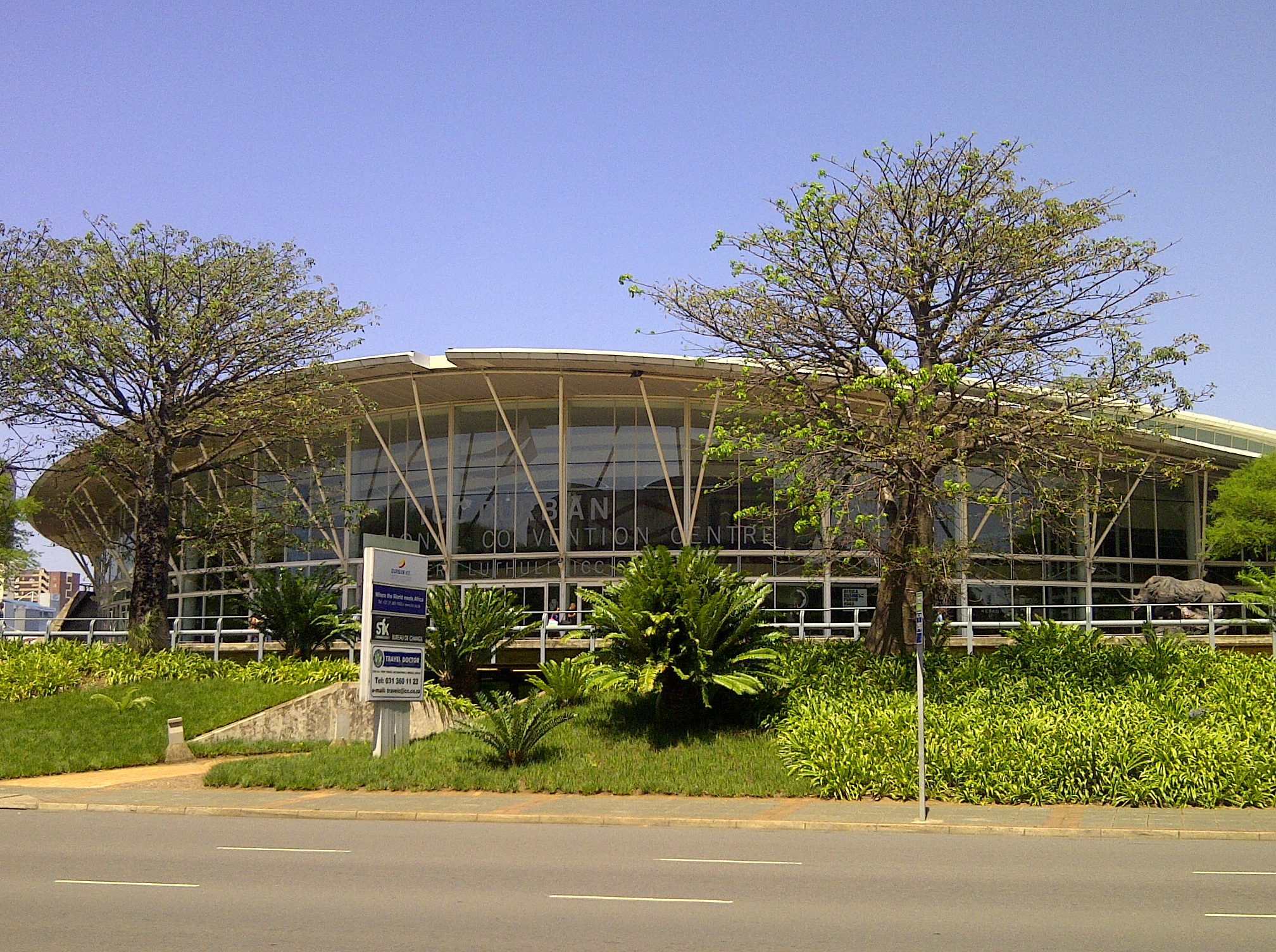
Inkosi Albert Luthuli International Convention Centre

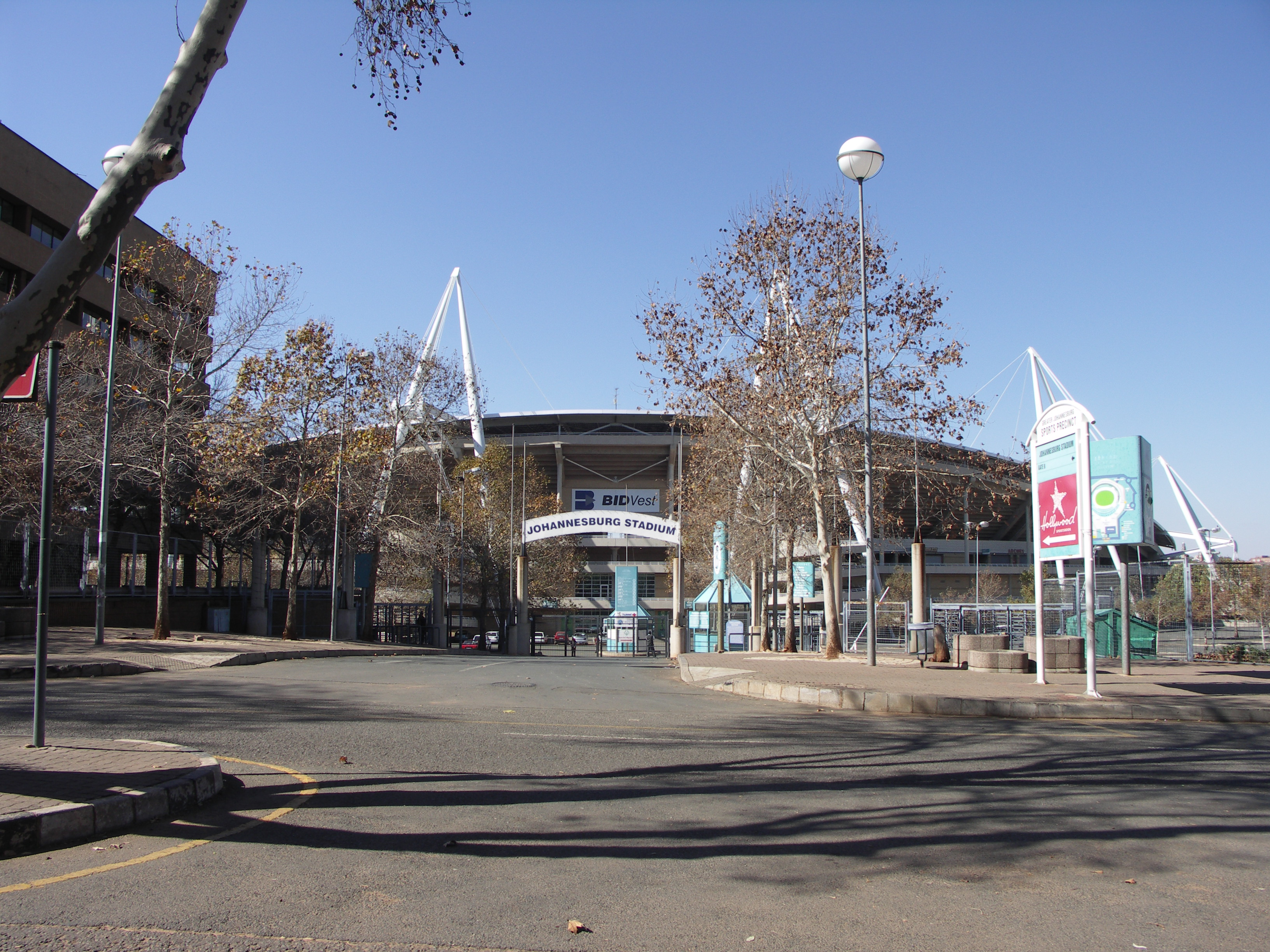
Johannesburg Stadium

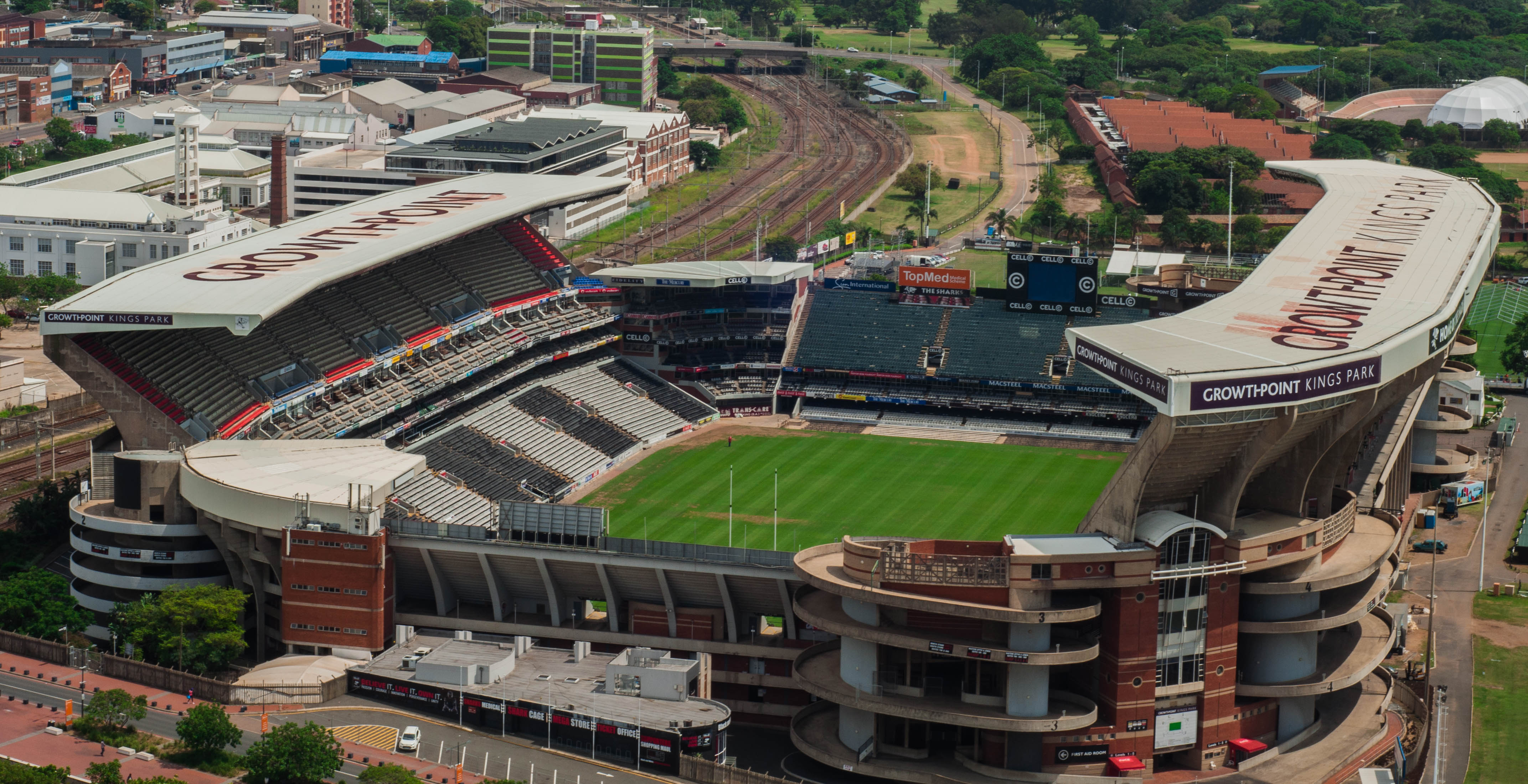
Kings Park Stadium

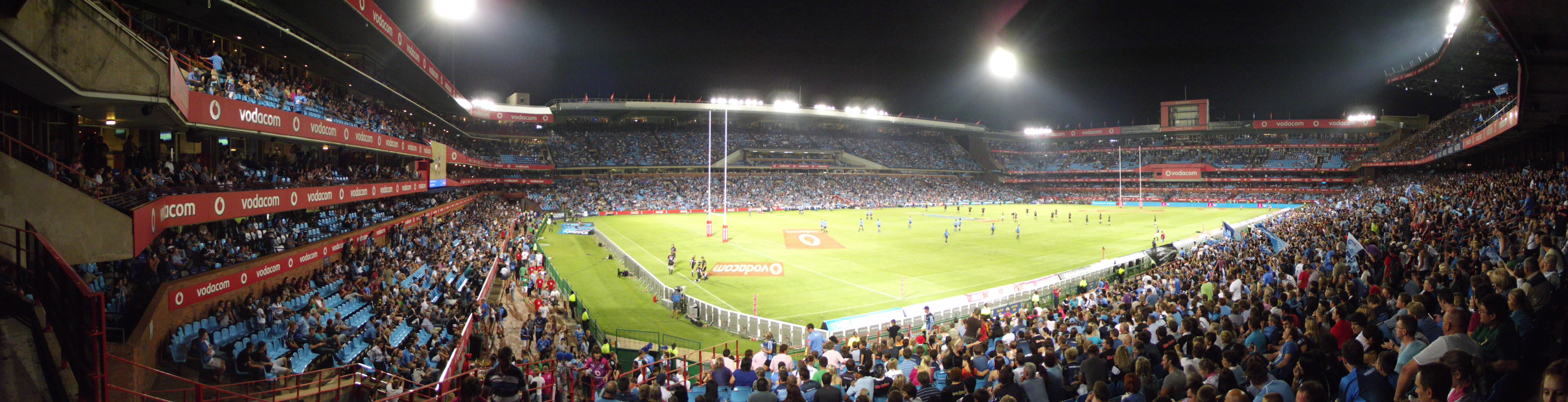
Loftus Versfeld Stadium

Moses Mabhida Stadium

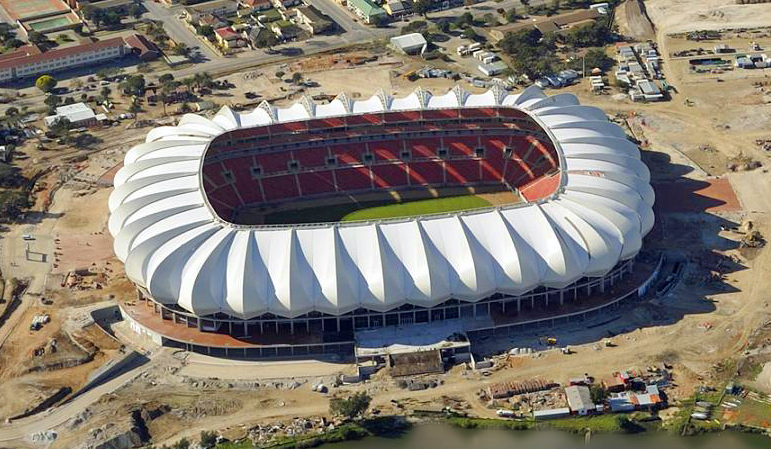
Nelson Mandela Bay Stadium

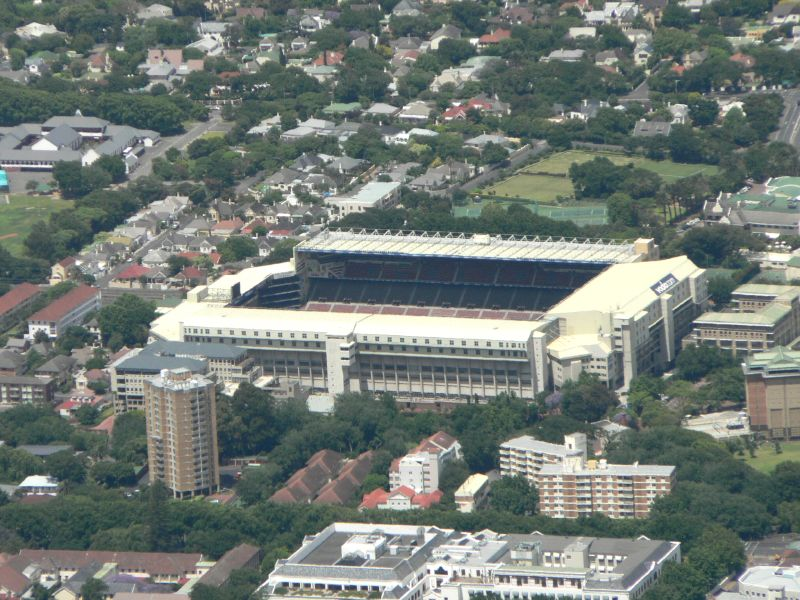
Newlands Stadium

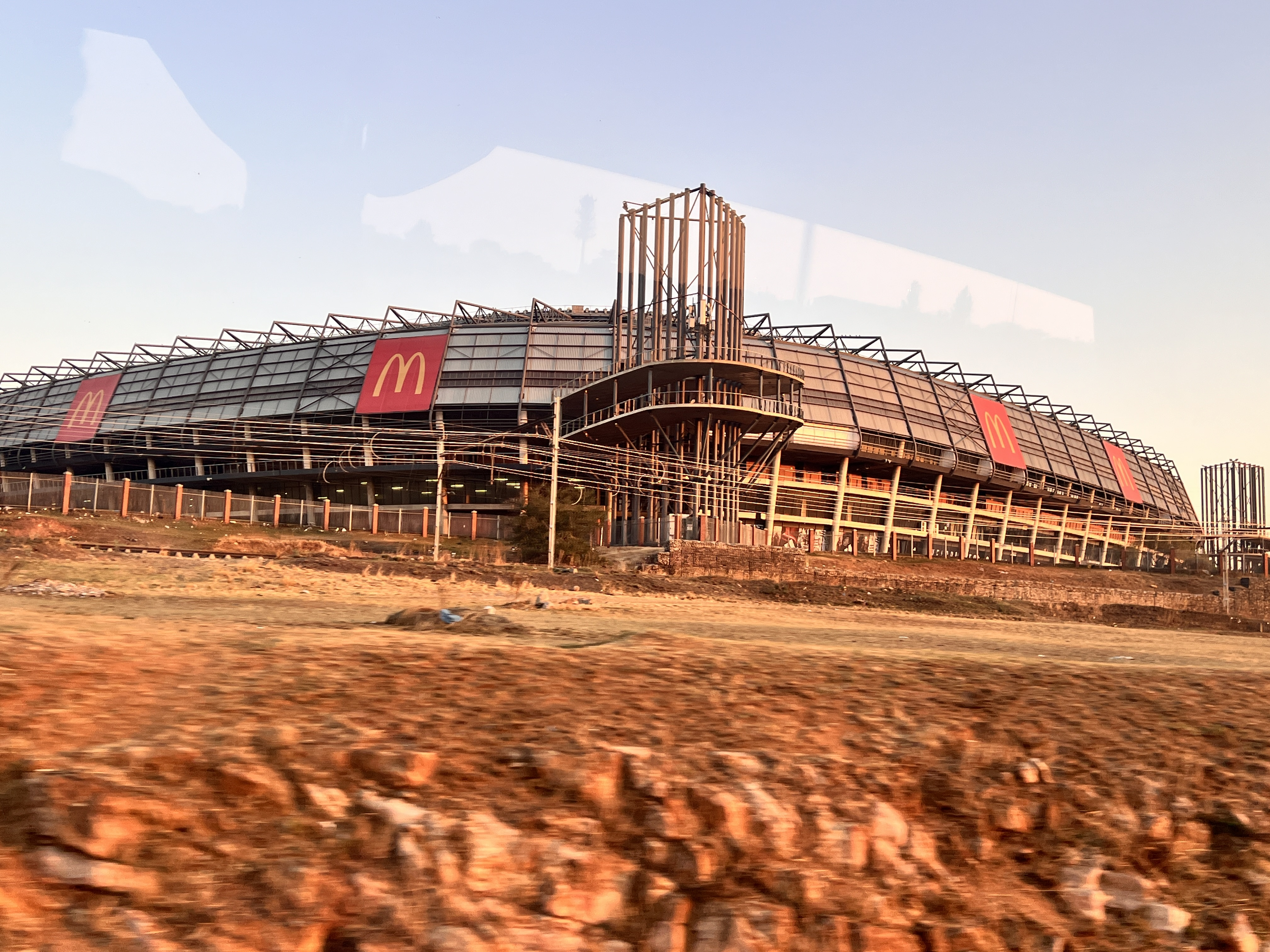
Orlando Stadium

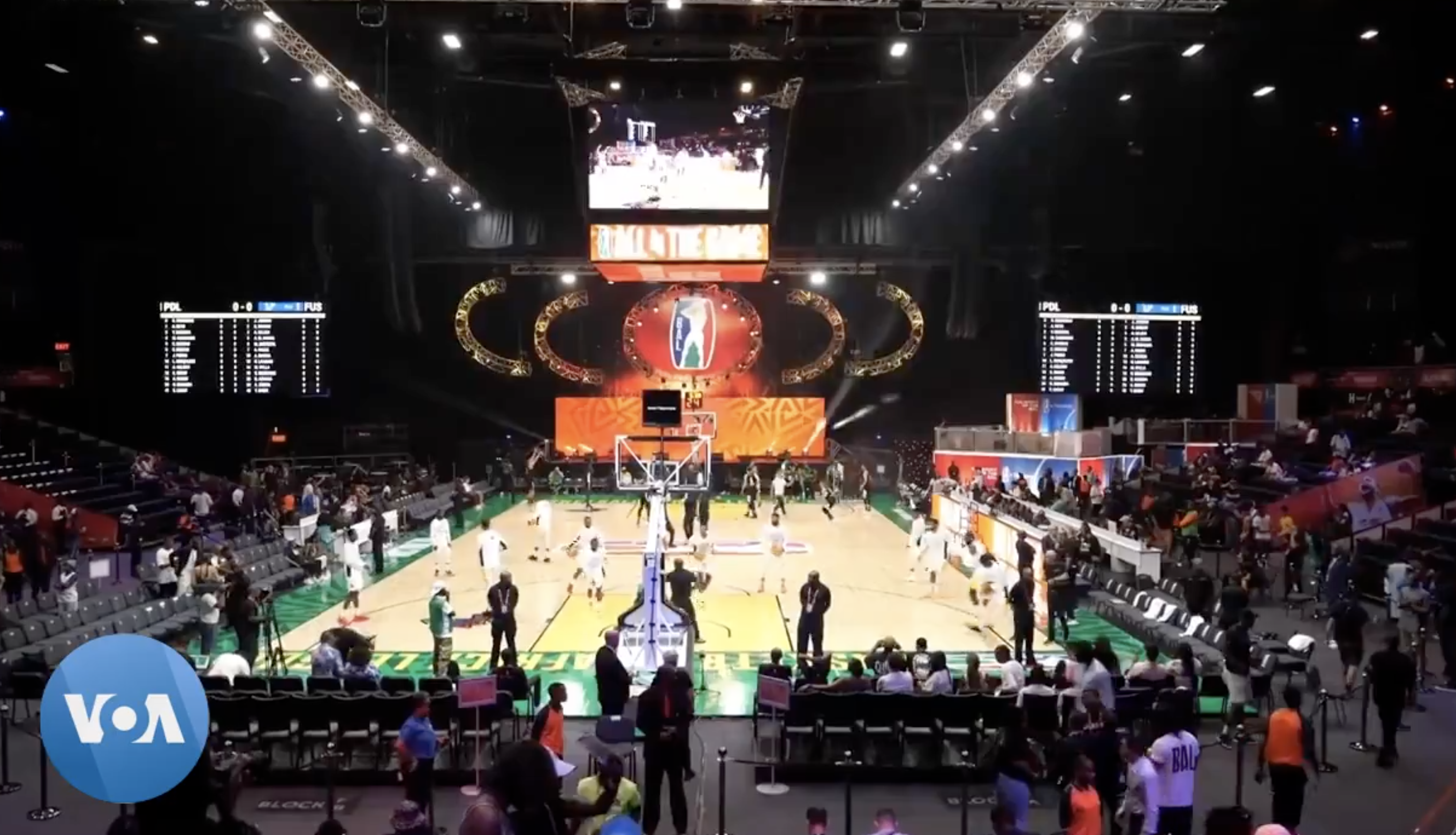
SunBet Arena
