= List of music venues in San Antonio =

== Introduction ==
The U.S city of San Antonio, Texas has large venues such as the Frost Bank Center, medium-sized venues such as The Paper Tiger that host large concerts and touring music acts, and many small venues that host other kinds of music.

== List ==
- 502 Bar
- Alamodome
- Aztec Theatre
- Bond's 007
- Charline McCombs Empire Theatre
- Cowboy's Dance Hall
- Fitzgerald's Bar & Live Music
- Freeman Coliseum
- Frost Bank Center (formerly AT&T Center)
- Hard Rock Cafe - San Antonio
- Hemisfair Park
- Hi Tones
- K23
- The Korova
- The Limelight
- Majestic Theatre
- The Mix
- Paper Tiger (formerly The White Rabbit)
- Sam's Burger Joint
- San Antonio Music Hall (formerly Backstage Live)
- Six Flags Fiesta Texas
- Sunken Garden Theater
- Sunset Station
- The Ten Eleven
- Tobin Center for the Performing Arts (formerly Municipal Auditorium)
- VFW Post 76
- Zombies

== See also ==
- List of concert venues
