= List of music venues in Greater Los Angeles =

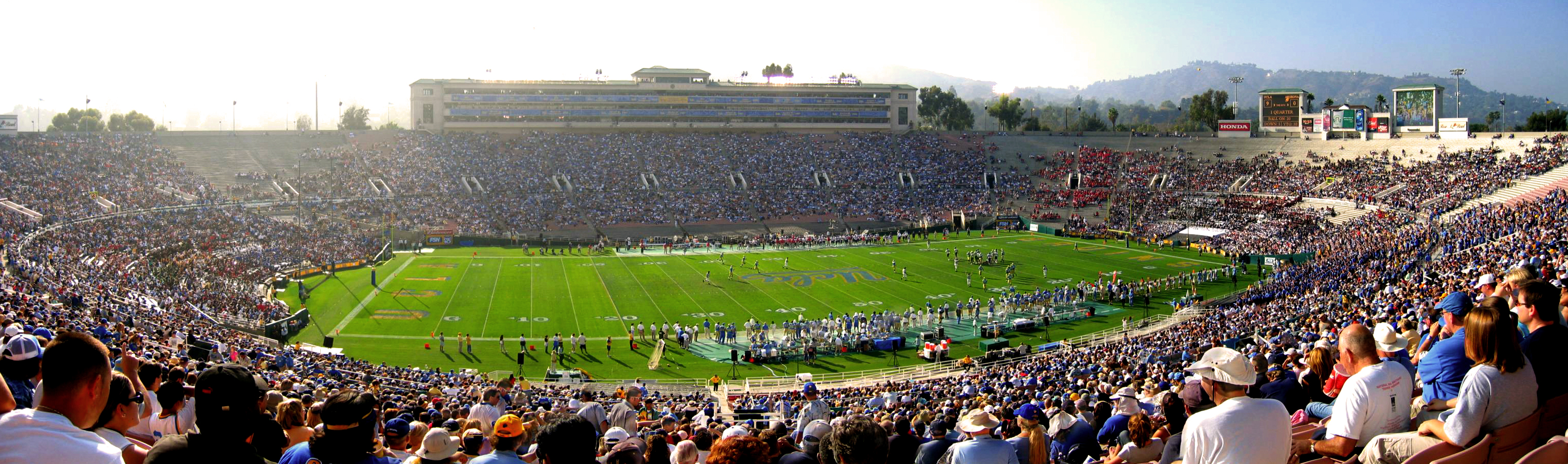
Located in Pasadena, the Rose Bowl is the venue with the largest seating capacity in Greater Los Angeles.

This is a list of notable music venues in Greater Los Angeles, California. This includes theaters, clubs, arenas, convention centers, and stadiums in the area, all which can host a concert.

== List of venues ==
Opened	Venue	City/L.A. Neighborhood	Capacity
2024	Water&Power	South LA	120
2019	Permanent Records Roadhouse	Cypress Park	98
2010	The Satellite	Silver Lake	130
2000	Hotel Café	Hollywood	220
2017	Zebulon	Elysian Valley	300
2001	The Echo	Echo Park	350
1994	Janet and Ray Scherr Forum Theatre	Thousand Oaks	394
2015	Jewel's Catch One	Arlington Heights	400
2017	Lodge Room	Highland Park	500
September 23, 1973	The Roxy	West Hollywood	500
1957	Troubadour	West Hollywood	500
January 16, 1964	Whisky a Go Go	West Hollywood	500
May 31, 2015	Teragram Ballroom	Westlake	625
1936	El Rey Theatre	Mid-Wilshire	771
2001	Echoplex	Echo Park	780
1996	The Glass House Concert Hall	Pomona	800
November 7, 2014	Regent Theater	Skid Row	1,100
October 18, 1926	The Fonda Theatre	Hollywood	1,200
1931	John Anson Ford Amphitheatre	Hollywood Hills	1,200
September 4, 1925	Alex Theatre	Glendale	1,400
November 11, 1926	The Belasco	South Park	1,500
2023	The Bellwether	Downtown Los Angeles	1,500
Unknown	Glendale Performing Arts Center	Glendale	1,559
1927	The Theatre at Ace Hotel	South Park	1,600
March 1968	Oxnard Performing Arts Center	Oxnard	1,608
1998	City National Grove of Anaheim	Anaheim	1,700
1990	Mayan Theater	South Park	1,700
1994	Fred Kavli Theatre	Thousand Oaks	1,800
1929	Royce Hall	Westwood	1,800
April 24, 1931	Fox Theater	Pomona	2,000
February 15, 1926	Orpheum Theatre	South Park	2,000
September 19, 1930	Saban Theatre	Beverly Hills	2,000
1968	Marsee Auditorium	Alondra Park	2,048
2017	House of Blues	Anaheim	2,200
October 24, 2003	Walt Disney Concert Hall	Civic Center	2,265
November 9, 2008	The Novo	South Park	2,300
November 7, 1931	The Wiltern	Koreatown	2,300
June 4, 1930	Pantages Theatre	Hollywood	2,703
1958	Santa Monica Civic Auditorium	Santa Monica	3,000
1931	Pasadena Civic Auditorium	Pasadena	3,029
1978	Terrace Theater	Long Beach	3,051
September 27, 1964	The Dorthy Chandler Pavilion	Civic Center	3,156
November 9, 2001	Dolby Theatre	Hollywood	3,332
October 31, 1940	Hollywood Palladium	Hollywood	3,714
1981	Industry Hills Expo Center	City of Industry	5,000
Unknown	Orange Pavilion	San Bernardino	5,000
January 8, 1987	Donald Bren Events Center	Irvine	5,430
September 25, 1930	Greek Theatre	Los Feliz	5,870
May 4, 2017	CBU Events Center	Riverside	6,000
August 9, 2021	YouTube Theater	Inglewood	6,000
1926	Shrine Auditorium and Expo Hall	University Park	6,300
October 18, 2007	Peacock Theater	South Park	7,100
July 29, 1983	Pacific Amphitheatre	Costa Mesa	8,042
October 12, 2006	Galen Center	Exposition Park	10,258
October 18, 2008	Toyota Arena	Ontario	11,089
1962	Long Beach Arena	Long Beach	13,500
July 11, 1922	Hollywood Bowl	Hollywood Hills	17,376
December 30, 1967	Kia Forum	Inglewood	17,500
August 15, 2024	Intuit Dome	Inglewood	18,000
June 17, 1993	Honda Center	Anaheim	18,900
October 17, 1999	Crypto.com Arena	South Park	20,000
April 18, 2018	BMO Stadium	Exposition Park	22,000
June 1, 2003	Dignity Health Sports Park	Carson	30,510
April 19, 1966	Angel Stadium	Anaheim	45,050
September 17, 1959	Dodger Stadium	Echo Park	57,000
1993	Glen Helen Amphitheater	San Bernardino	65,000
September 8, 2020	SoFi Stadium	Inglewood	70,240
May 1, 1923	Los Angeles Memorial Coliseum	Exposition Park	93,607
October 8, 1922	Rose Bowl	Pasadena	96,771

== Gallery ==
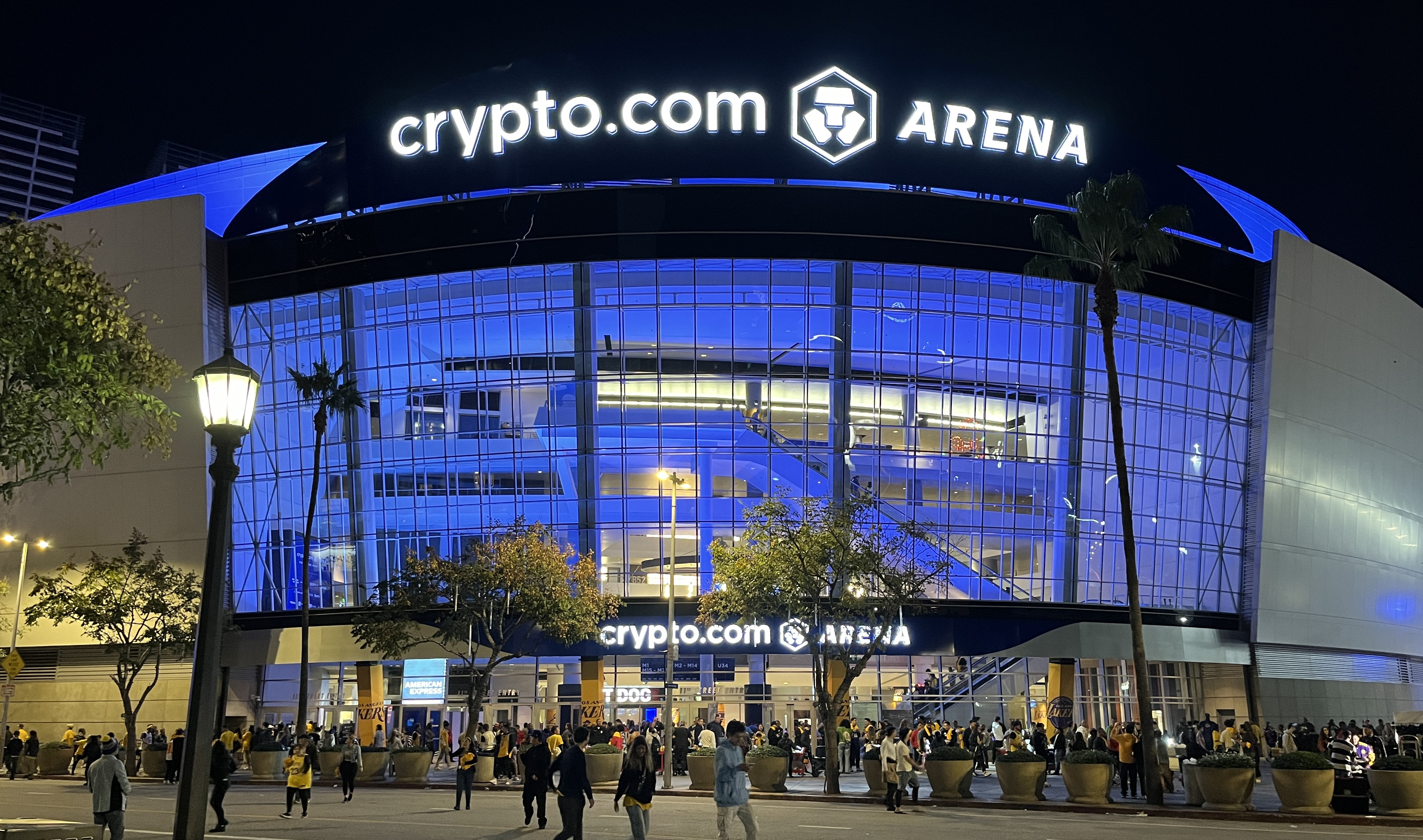
Crypto.com Arena

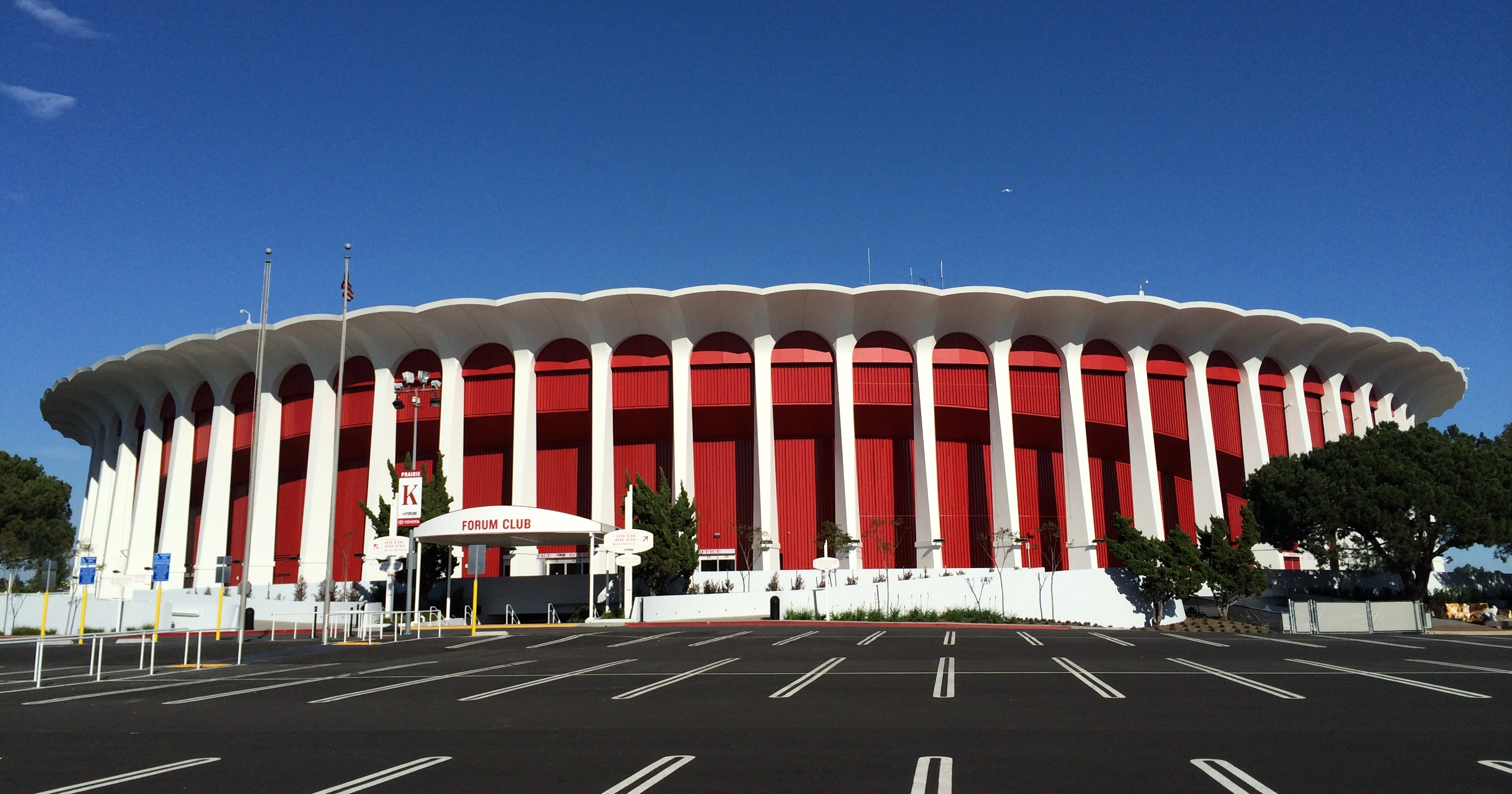
The Forum

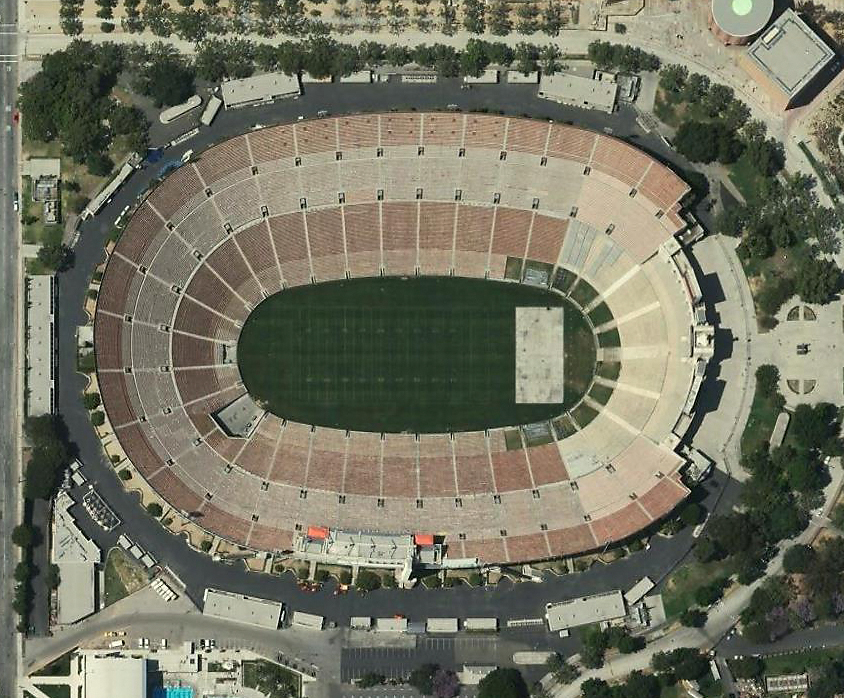
Los Angeles Memorial Coliseum

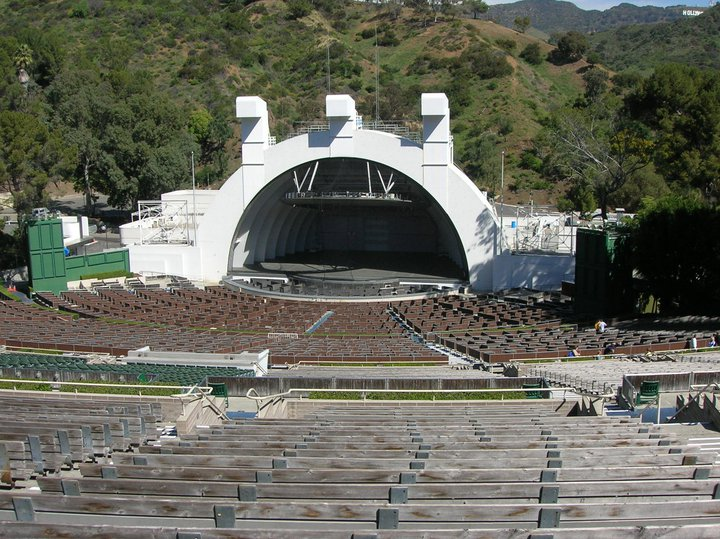
Hollywood Bowl

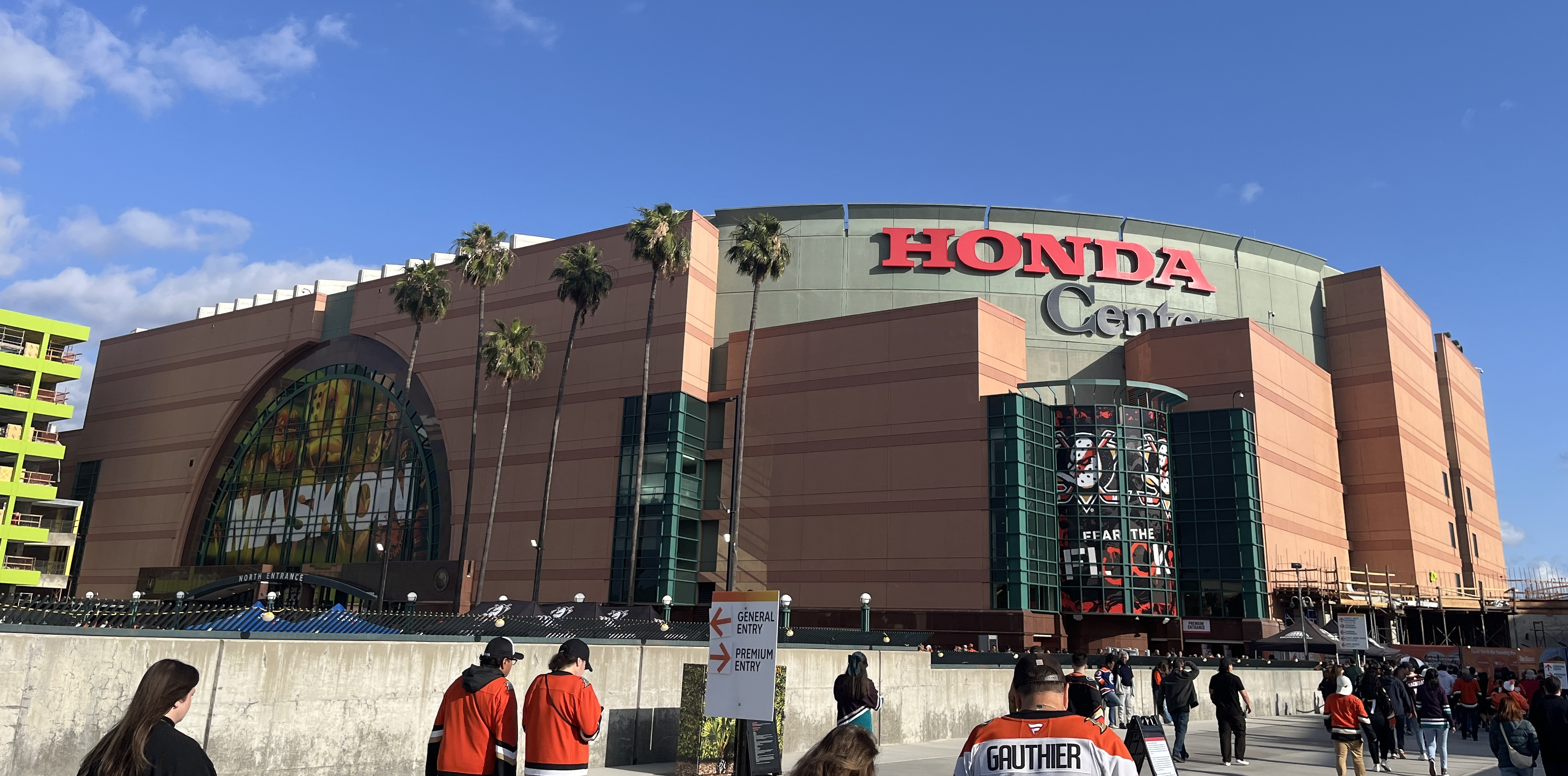
Honda Center

== See also ==
- List of concert venues
