= Doc Salomon =

American film director and studio manager

- Born: Ananda Max Salomon; January 15, 1891; Heidelberg, Baden-Württemberg, Germany
- Died: July 5, 1944 (aged 53); Teddington, Staines, England
- Occupations: Film director; studio manager

Ananda Max Salomon (January 15, 1891 – 5 July 1944) was an American film director and studio manager at Teddington Studios.

Salomon was born in Heidelberg, Baden-Württemberg, Germany, and moved to San Francisco when he was one year old. His father, Max Salomon, was born in Illinois and his mother, Wilhelmina "Minna" Welte Salomon, was German. He was a cousin of Jack L. Warner's first wife Irma Solomons (1916–1935), and became Warner's first employee, and eventually head of Warner's British operation.

He was killed in a V-1 flying bomb attack at Warner Bros. Studios in Teddington, Staines, while recording the sound of the V-1s.

Salomon was cremated and his ashes returned to San Francisco. He was survived by his wife, Joan Denise Salomon.

== Films ==
- The Side Show Jack Born and Elmer Lawrence sound short Vitaphone 1928
