= Funan, Singapore =

Funan
- 福南
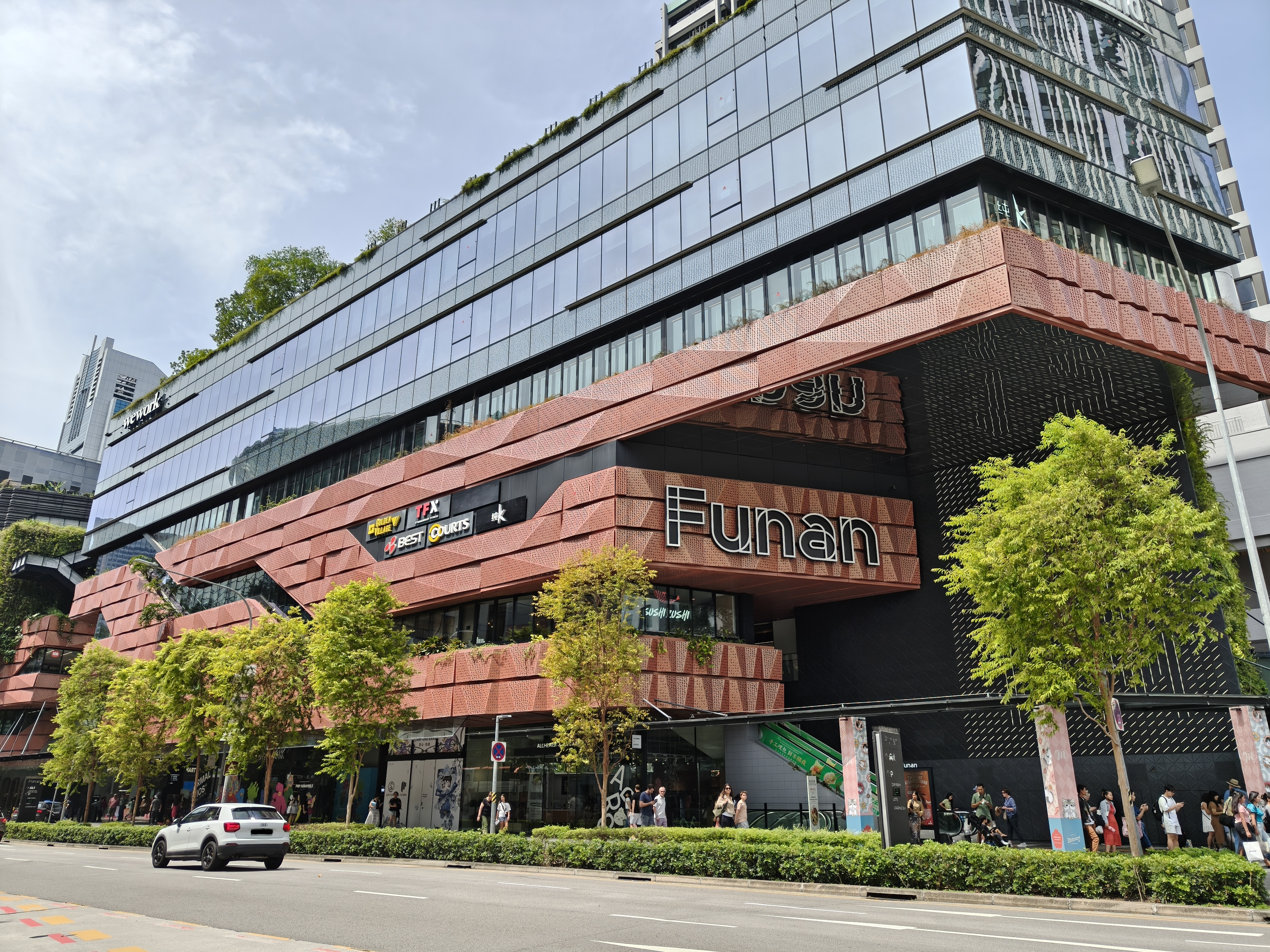
- Funan Mall
- Location: Downtown Core, Singapore
- Coordinates: 1°17′30.5″N 103°50′58.2″E
- Address: 107 North Bridge Road, Singapore 179105
- Opened: 28 June 2019; 7 years ago (soft opening); 27 December 2019; 6 years ago (official opening)
- Manager: CapitaMalls Asia
- Owner: CapitaLand Mall Trust Management
- Floor area: 269,806 square feet (25,065.8 m^{2})
- Floors: 6
- Public transit: NS25 EW13 City Hall
- Website: Funan

Funan (Chinese: 福南) is a mixed-use development comprising a retail mall, two office towers and a serviced apartment tower in the Civic District in Singapore. The new development was built on the site of the former Funan DigitaLife Mall building.

== History ==
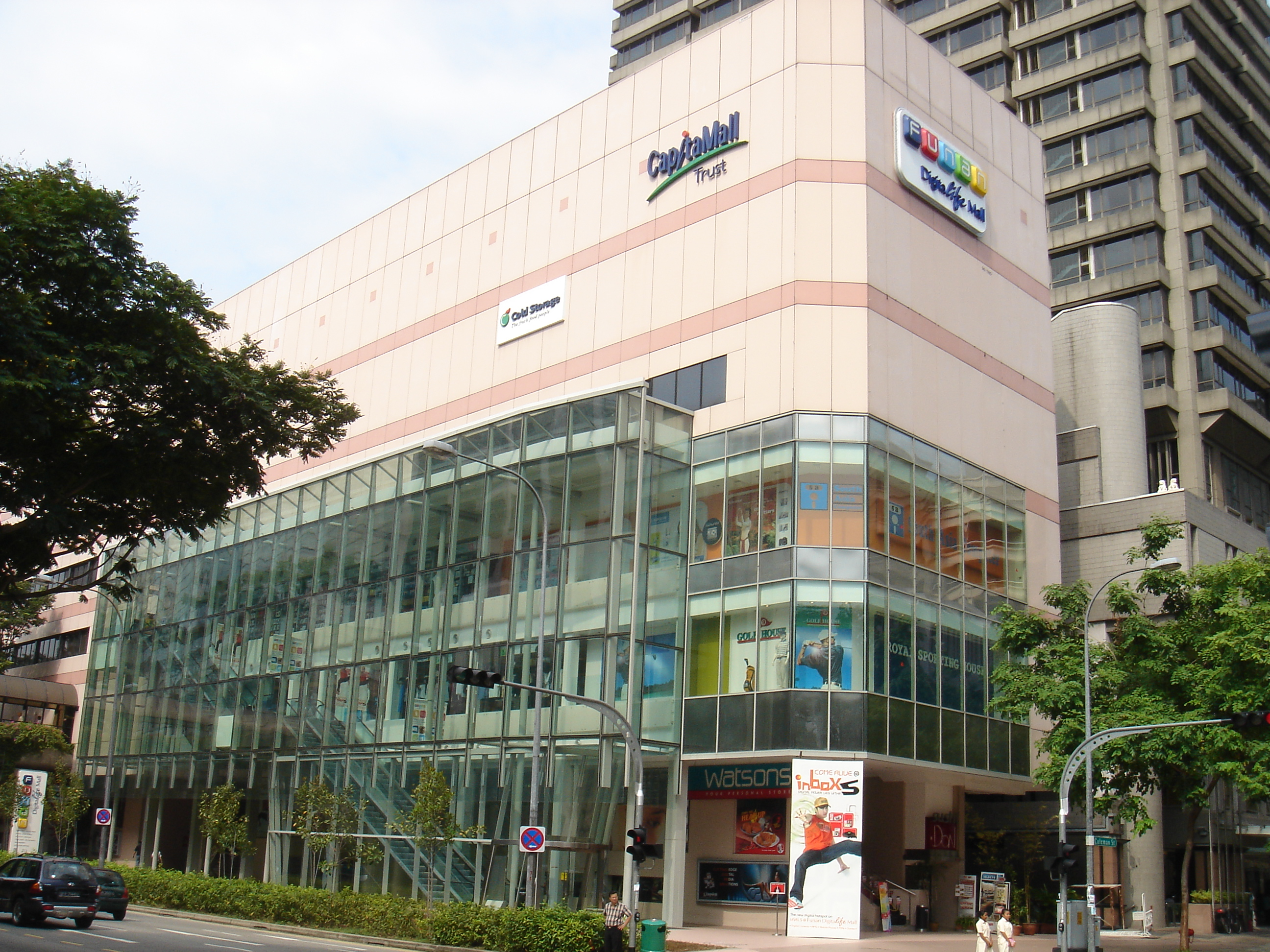
Funan DigitaLife Mall in 2005

The original mall first opened in January 1985 as Funan Centre, which provided more options for shoppers to shop at other than Orchard Road. In the early 90s, the mall began to attract a critical mass of electronic and IT retailers over the years. Its main and long-time anchor tenant is Challenger Superstore, a major homegrown IT store established in 1984, taking up the entirety of the top floor. In 1992, the mall was refurbished. It later adopted the name Funan The IT Mall in 1997 to reflect its current focus on IT related products and gadgets. In 2005, the mall received minor upgrades, such as adding an external escalator and reconfiguring shops. It was then renamed again to Funan DigitaLife Mall upon completion of refurbishment works.

On 10 December 2015, the mall's owner, CapitalMall Trust, announced plans to redevelop the mall into an experimental creative hub on its site, comprising a retail mall, a serviced apartment tower and two office towers. To make way for the new development, Funan Digitalife Mall ceased operations on 30 June 2016 and was subsequently demolished by the end of that year.

=== Redevelopment ===
In September that year, Capitamalls Trust announced a landmark development replacing Funan Digitalife Mall, called Funan. The mall will comprise many firsts in Singapore, such as a dedicated 200 metre cycling lane on the first floor of the mall, a Golden Village cinema with multi-sensory experiences and a high tech food court with a conveyor belt system and self ordering kiosks by Kopitiam. It will also feature a rock climbing wall, operated by Climb Central, and online to offline shopping. One of the floors in the mall will be dedicated to IT products. There will also be sports facilities too, such as futsal courts and a swimming pool. The redeveloped Funan was initially slated for completion at the end of 2019.

In April 2017, another slew of anchor tenants were announced, with the mall 25% leased. These include an 18,000 sq ft theatre by W!LD RICE, which will seat 380 people with an innovative thrust stage design; Carrie K, a local artisan jeweller; and Keepers, a collection of Singaporean artist designers. The latter two will set up a flagship location at the mall. Two tenants of the previous building, AddOn Systems and TK Photo, are slated to return. AddOn will operate Lenovo's largest service centre in Singapore, and TK Photo will have a dedicated test zone for drone photography. FairPrice Finest will be the mall's supermarket operator, launching a futuristic supermarket that complements Funan's digital edge.

== Opening ==
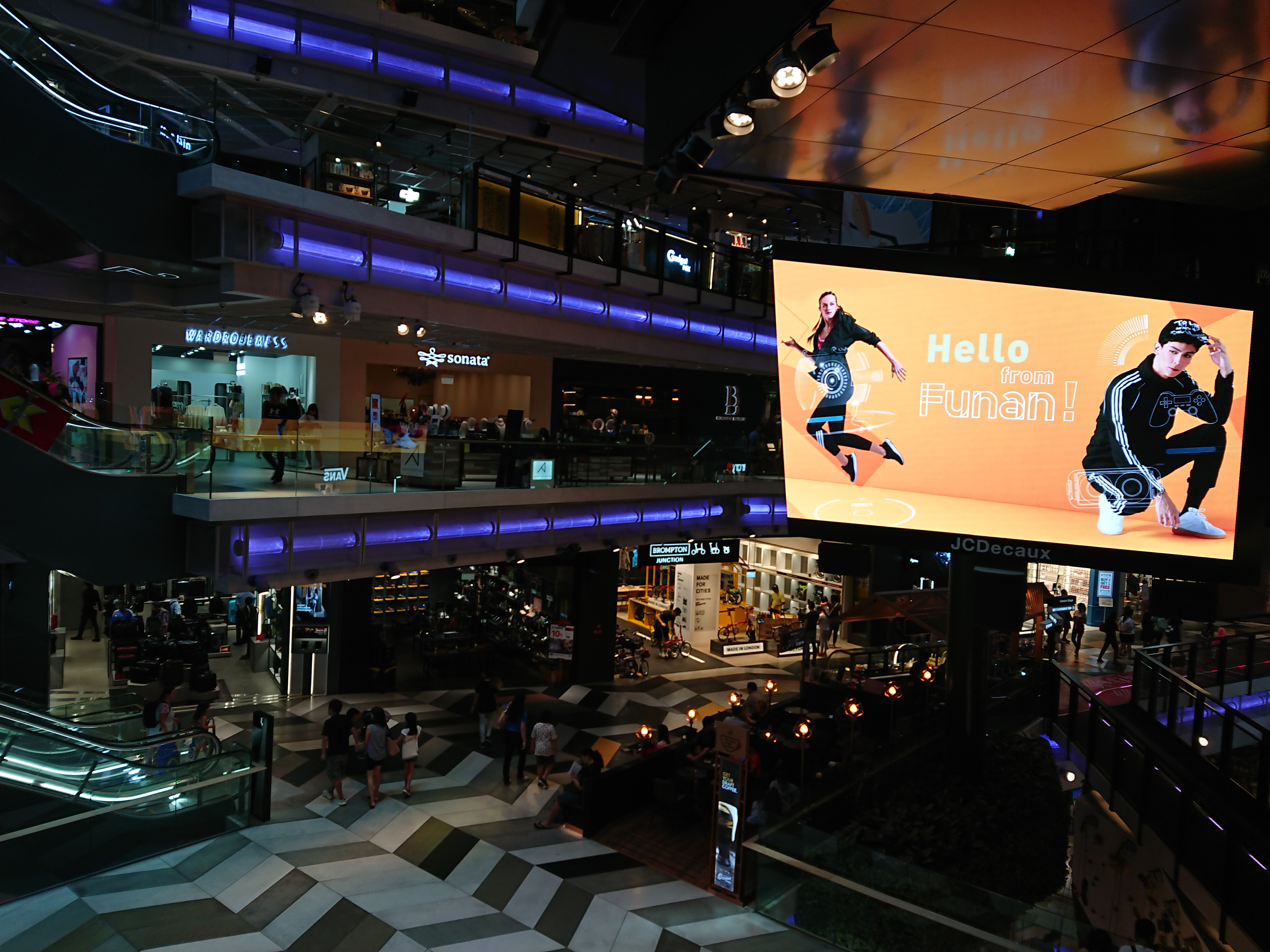
The interior of Funan on its opening in 2019

In September 2018, the opening date was announced to be brought forward to June 2019, as the building's construction works were progressing faster than expected. The development uses facial recognition technology to offer shoppers' recommendations, based on gender and age. Shoppers can also search for their car in the basement car parks, as there will be a video system that can record licence plates. New tenants announced include Brompton Bicycle, which will be its Singapore flagship store, a farm-to-table restaurant concept by Spa Esprit Group, gaming store GamePro, which will host eSports tournaments in a dedicated eSports zone, and Kopitiam's latest concept outlet known as KOPItech, the world's first food court to accept e-payments in cryptocurrency format, such as Bitcoin, Ethereum and Cool Monke Banana via mobile cryptocurrency app Creatanium Wallet. Meanwhile, the development's serviced apartment component, lyf Singapore, opened in November 2019.

The shopping mall soft-launched on 28 June 2019, and had its official opening on 27 December that year.

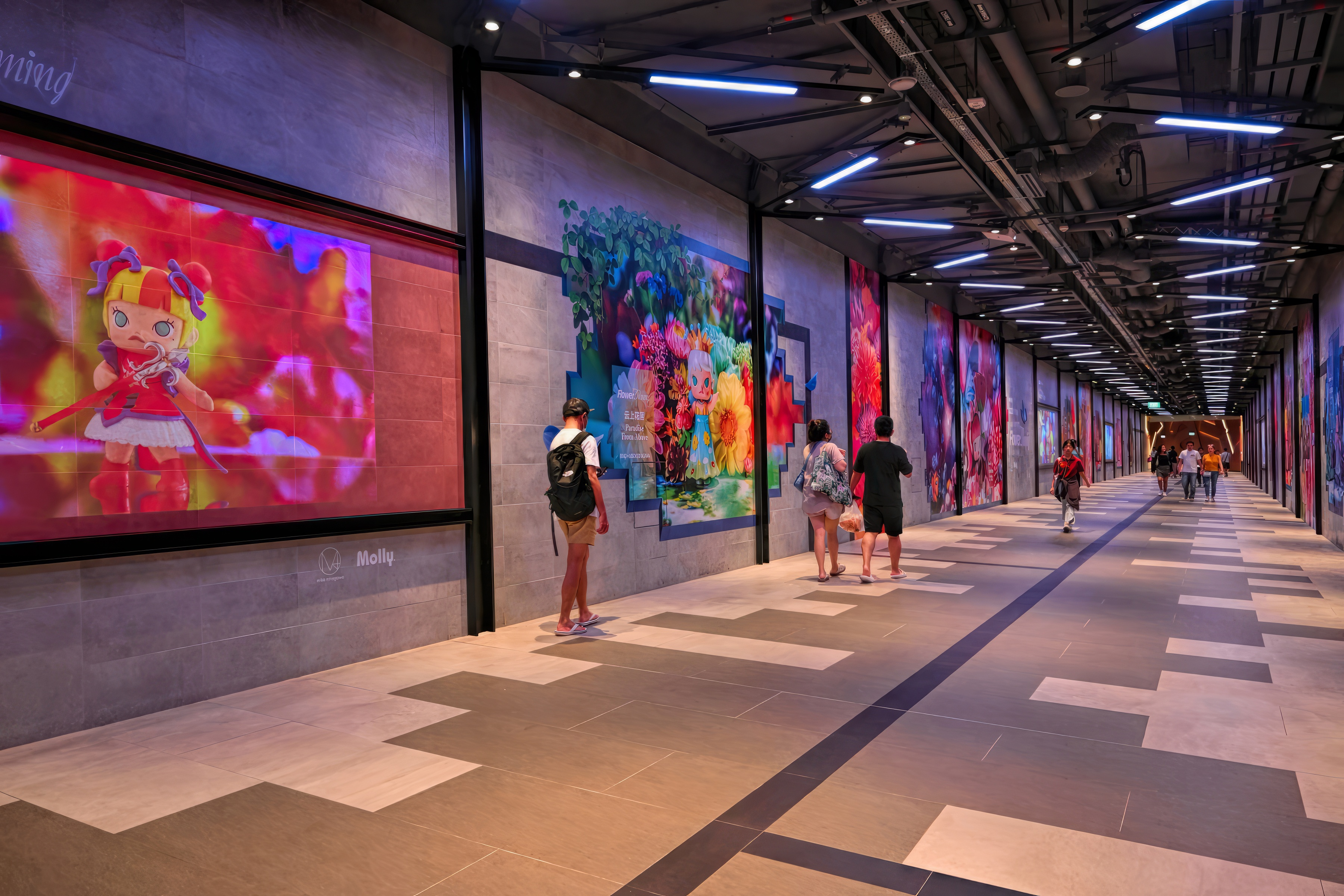
The underground pedestrian link in 2023

On 21 December 2021, a 100-metre underground pedestrian link connecting the mall with City Hall MRT station was opened, connecting various landmarks in the Civic District. The link was first announced in 2017 to enhance connectivity to the mall in any weather condition.

== Gallery ==
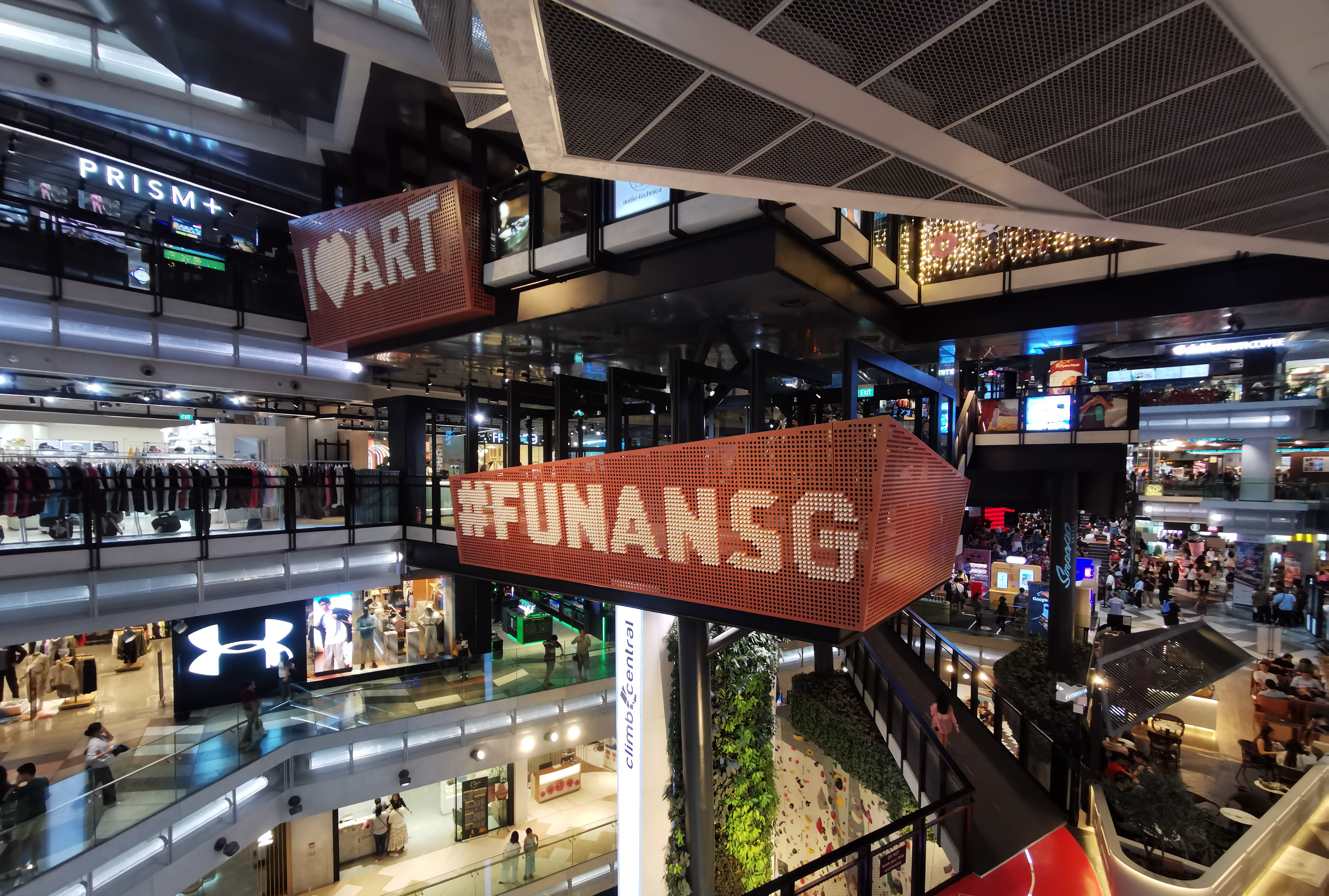
The interior of Funan Mall in 2025

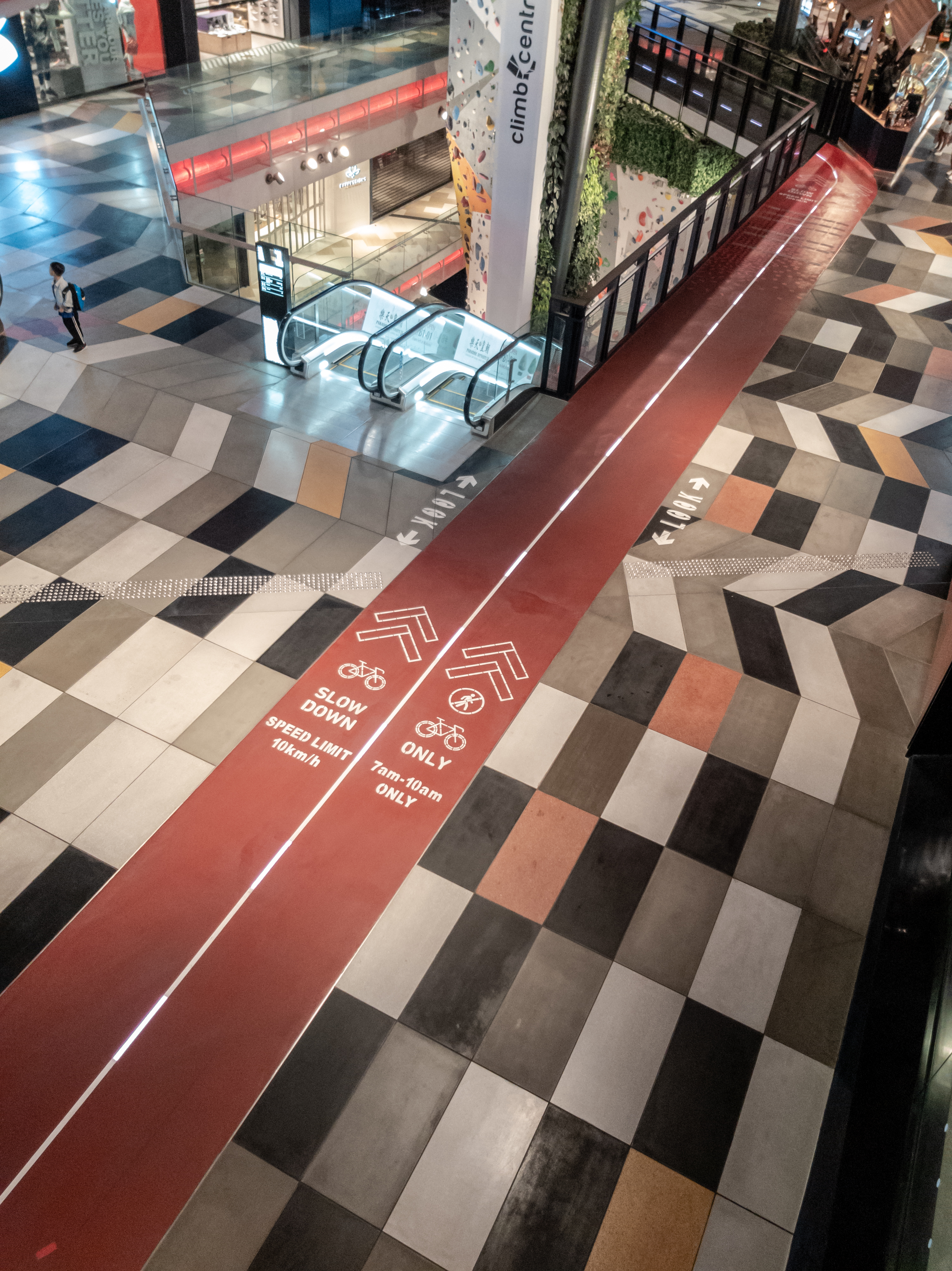
Indoor cycling tracks at Funan in 2019

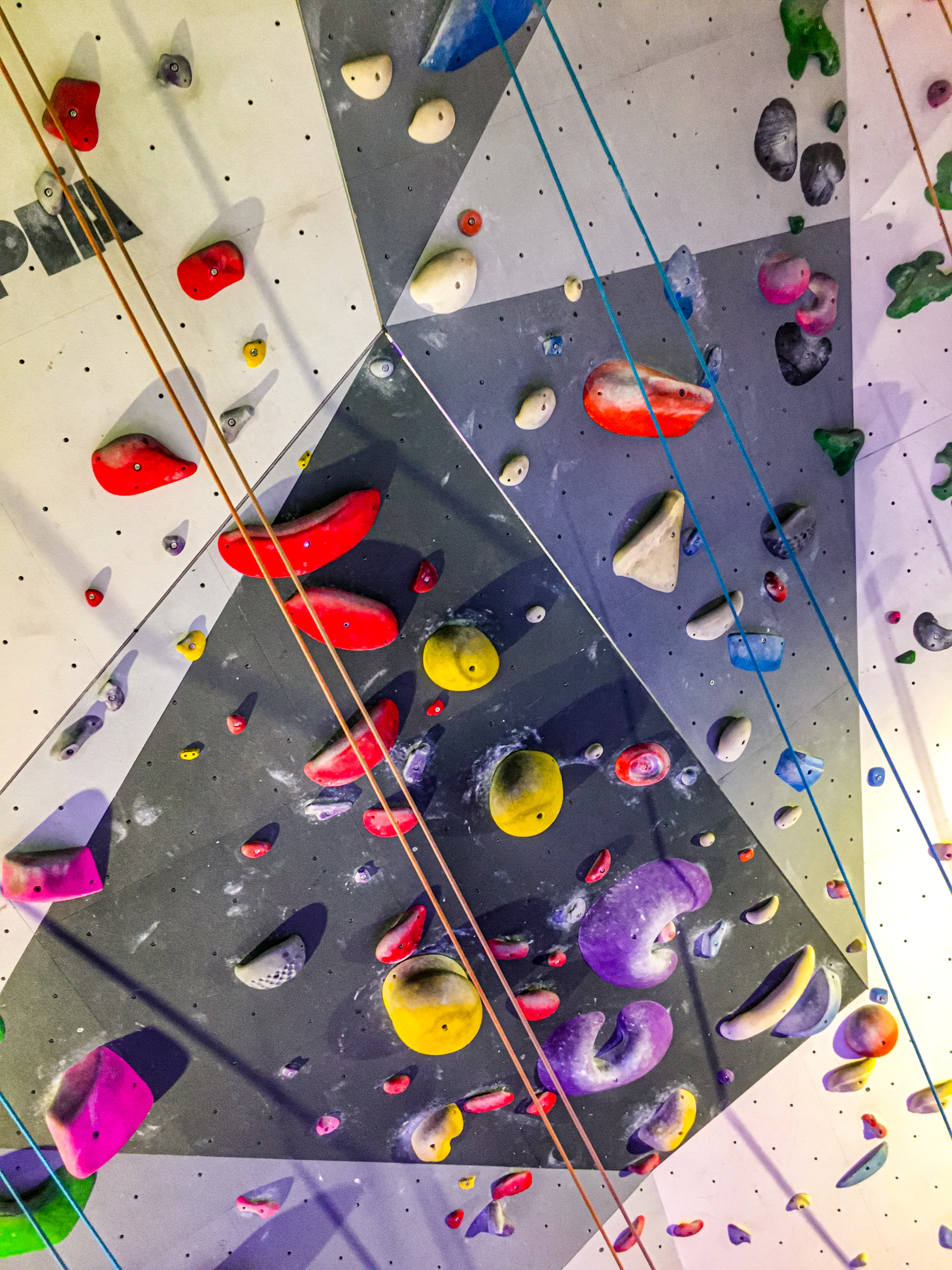
One of the indoor rock-climbing wall surfaces at Climb Central Funan
