= Funan DigitaLife Mall =

Defunct Singapore shopping mall

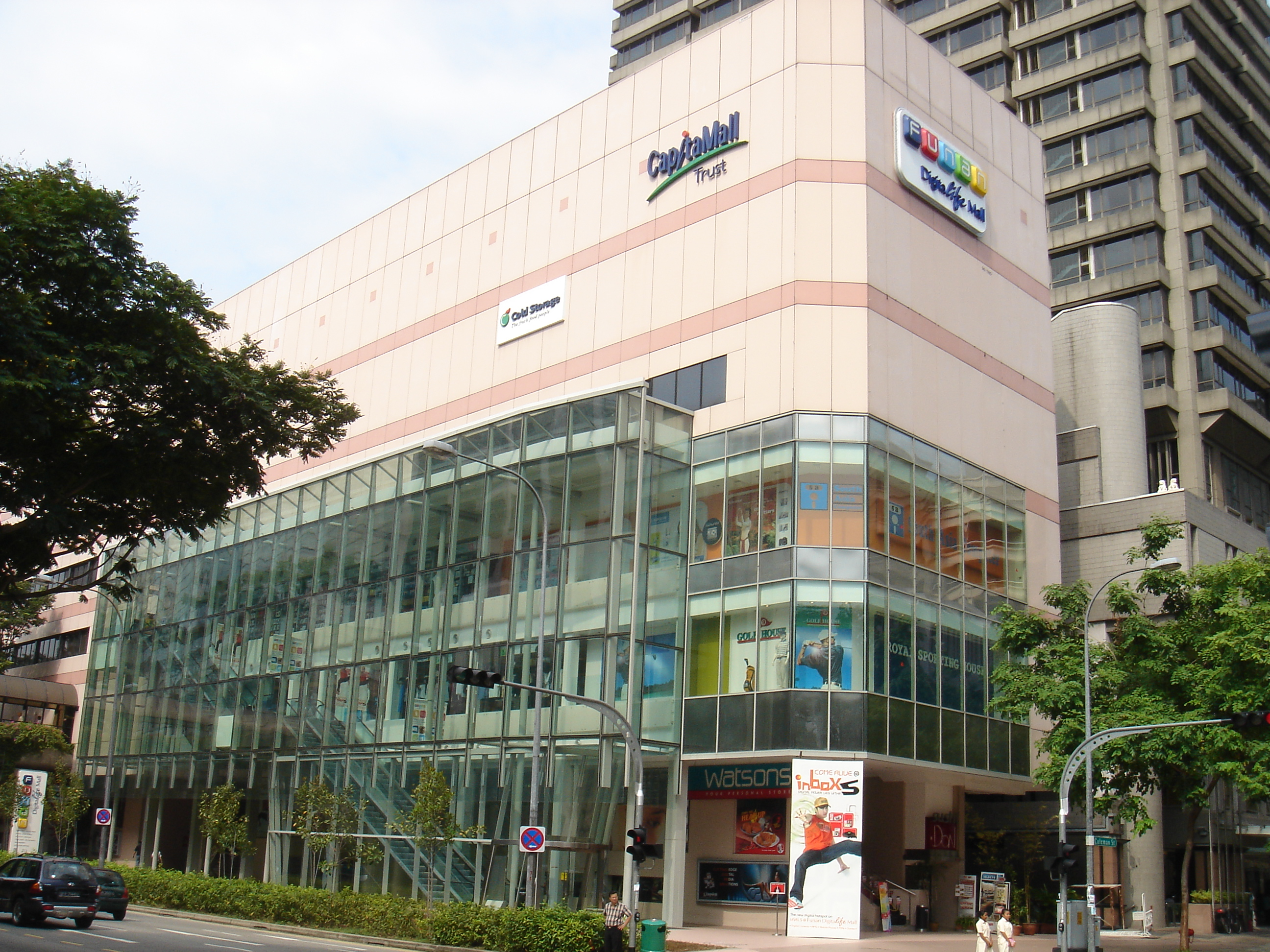
- Funan DigitaLife Mall
- Location: Downtown Core, Singapore
- Coordinates: 1°17′30.5″N 103°50′58.2″E
- Address: 109 North Bridge Road, Singapore 179097
- Opened: January 1985; 41 years ago
- Closed: 30 June 2016; 10 years ago
- Manager: CapitaMalls Asia
- Owner: CapitaLand Mall Trust Management
- Num. of stores: 194
- Floor area: 269,806 square feet (25,065.8 m^{2})
- Floors: 7
- Public transit: NS25 EW13 City Hall
- Website: www.funan.com.sg

Funan DigitaLife Mall, formerly Funan The IT Mall and Funan Centre, was a shopping centre formerly located near the Civic District in Singapore. Completed in 1985, the mall specialised in electronics and IT-related goods. It was a more upmarket competitor of Sim Lim Square, the latter of which catered more to those seeking more budget purchases. It was closed and demolished in 2016.

== History ==
The mall opened in January 1985 as Funan Centre as a general shopping centre, which provided more options for shoppers to shop at other than Orchard Road. In the early 90s, the mall began to attract a critical mass of electronic and IT retailers over the years. Its main and long-time anchor tenant is Challenger Superstore, a major homegrown IT store established in 1984. In 1992, the mall was refurbished. It later adopted the name Funan The IT Mall in 1997 to reflect its current focus on IT related outlets. In 2005, the mall received minor upgrades, and was again renamed to Funan DigitaLife Mall.

There were a total of 178 outlets spread over six floors. Challenger Superstore occupied almost the entirety of the sixth floor, and was accompanied by another anchor tenants such as Harvey Norman in the other floors.

=== Decline and revamp ===
Due to the popularity of online shopping, business at the mall had been declining over the past few years, forcing tenants to close down. The mall was initially planned to be renovated in 2014. However, it was later slated for demolition. The last day of mall operation was 30 June 2016. All tenants have since relocated and the building was later demolished.

The new commercial building whose name was stripped down to Funan was being built on its former site. The new commercial building would have a 24-hour drive-thru, underground walkway to City Hall MRT station, The Adelphi Lifestyle Mall and Capitol Theatre. It also would have serviced apartments and offices as well. Originally slated to be reopened in 2020, the building was re-opened earlier than the scheduled reopening date on 28 June 2019.

== Gallery ==
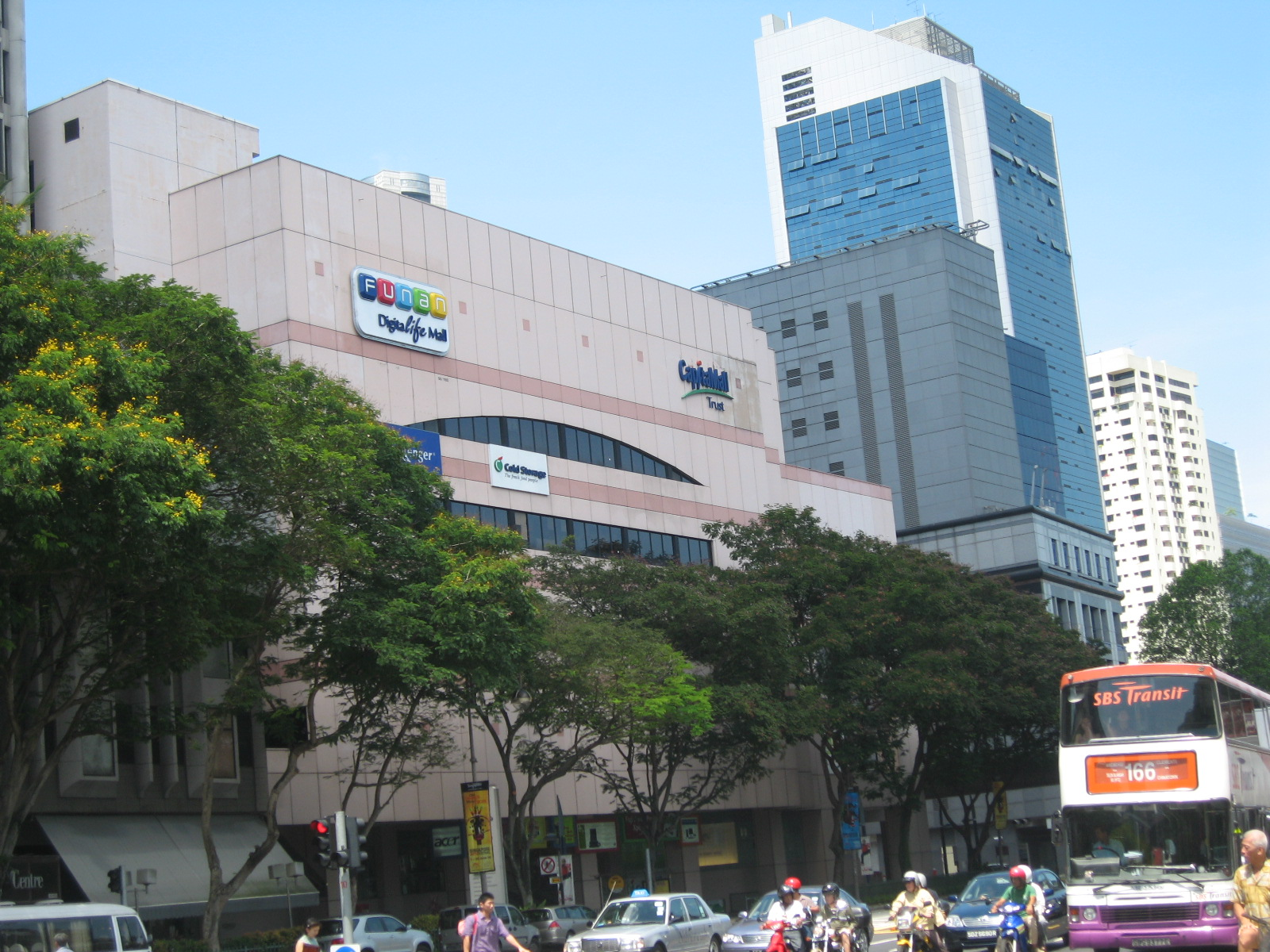
Funan Digitalife Mall

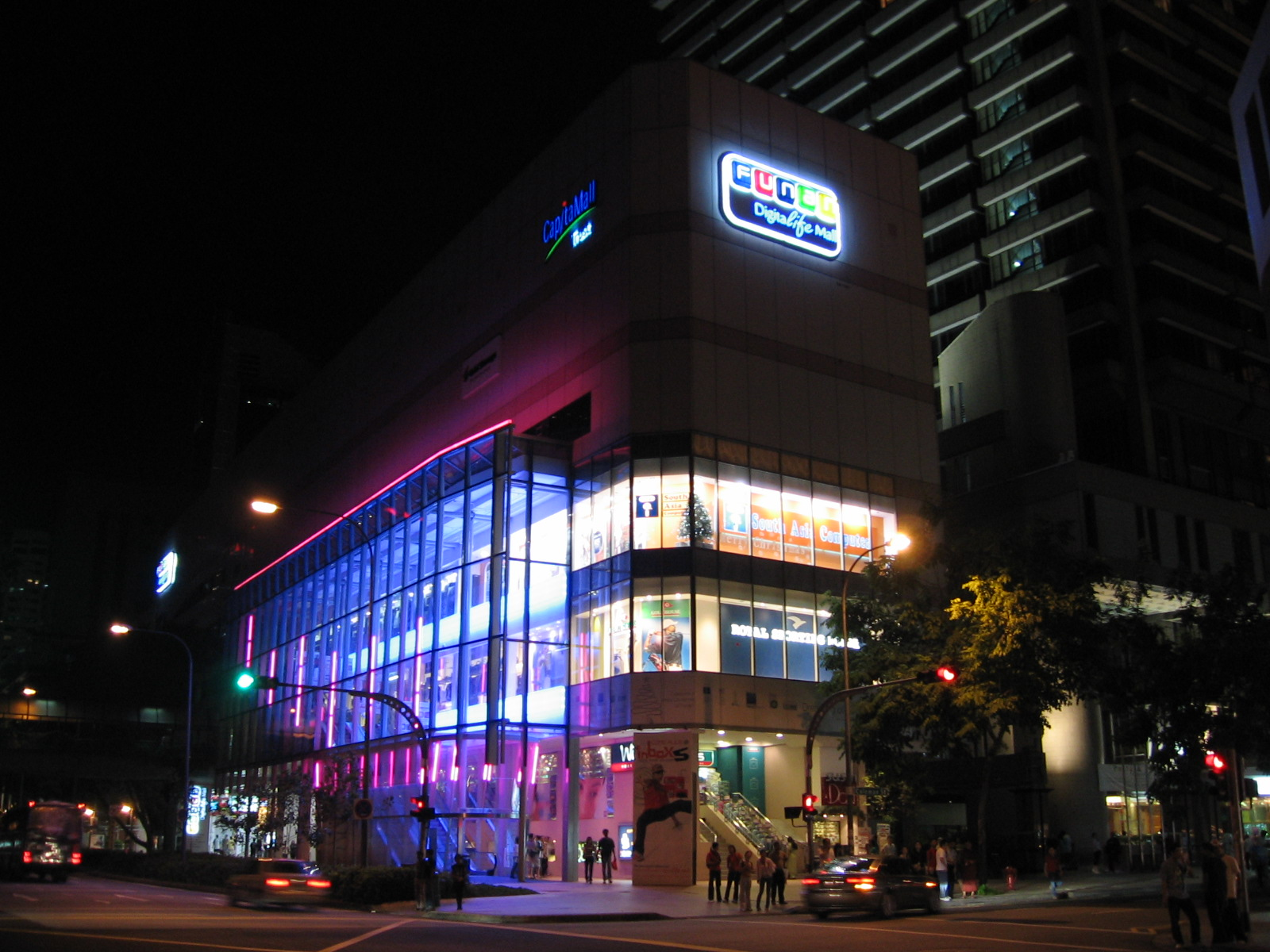
Funan Digitalife Mall by night.

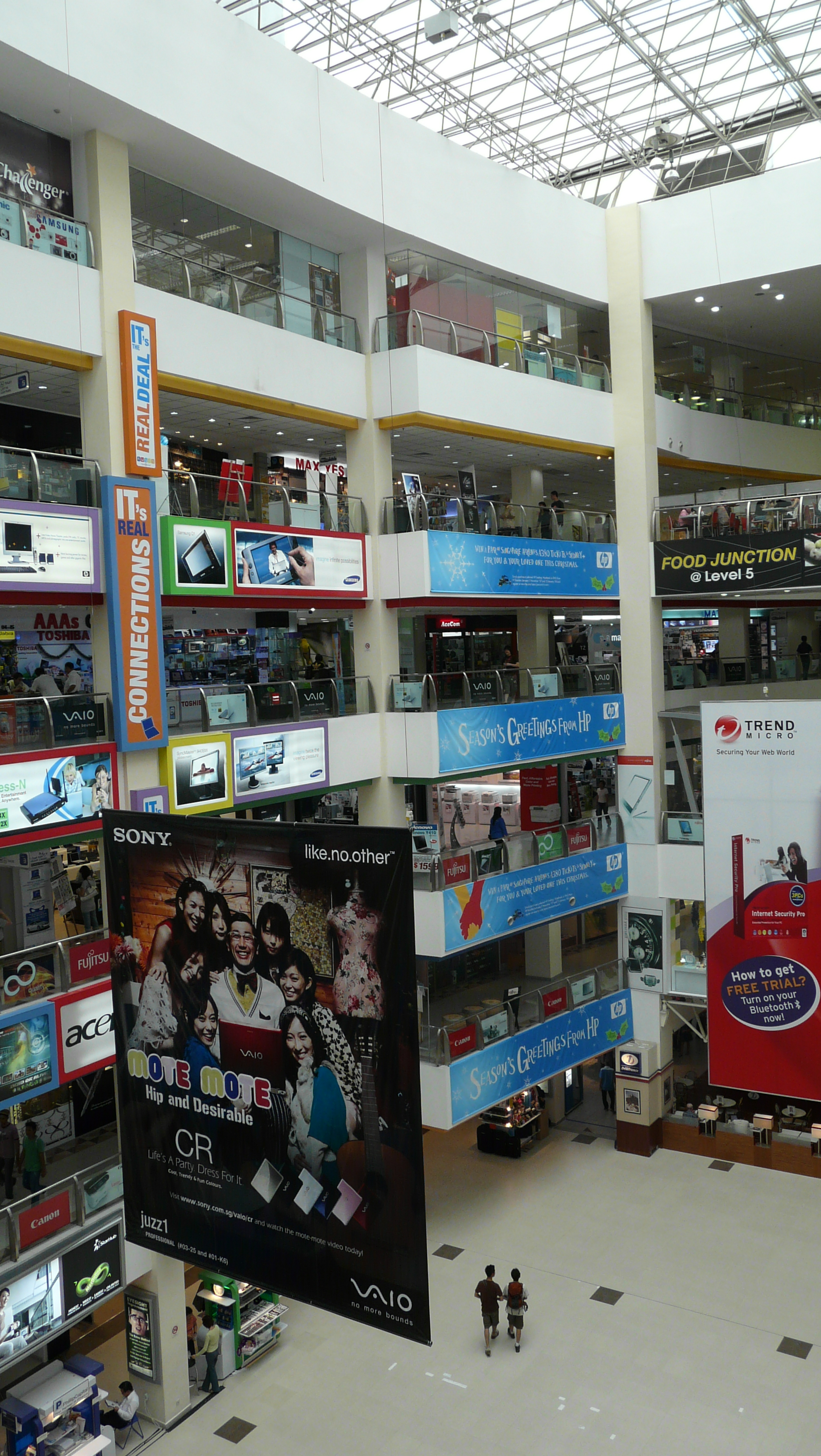
Funan Digitalife Mall Interior

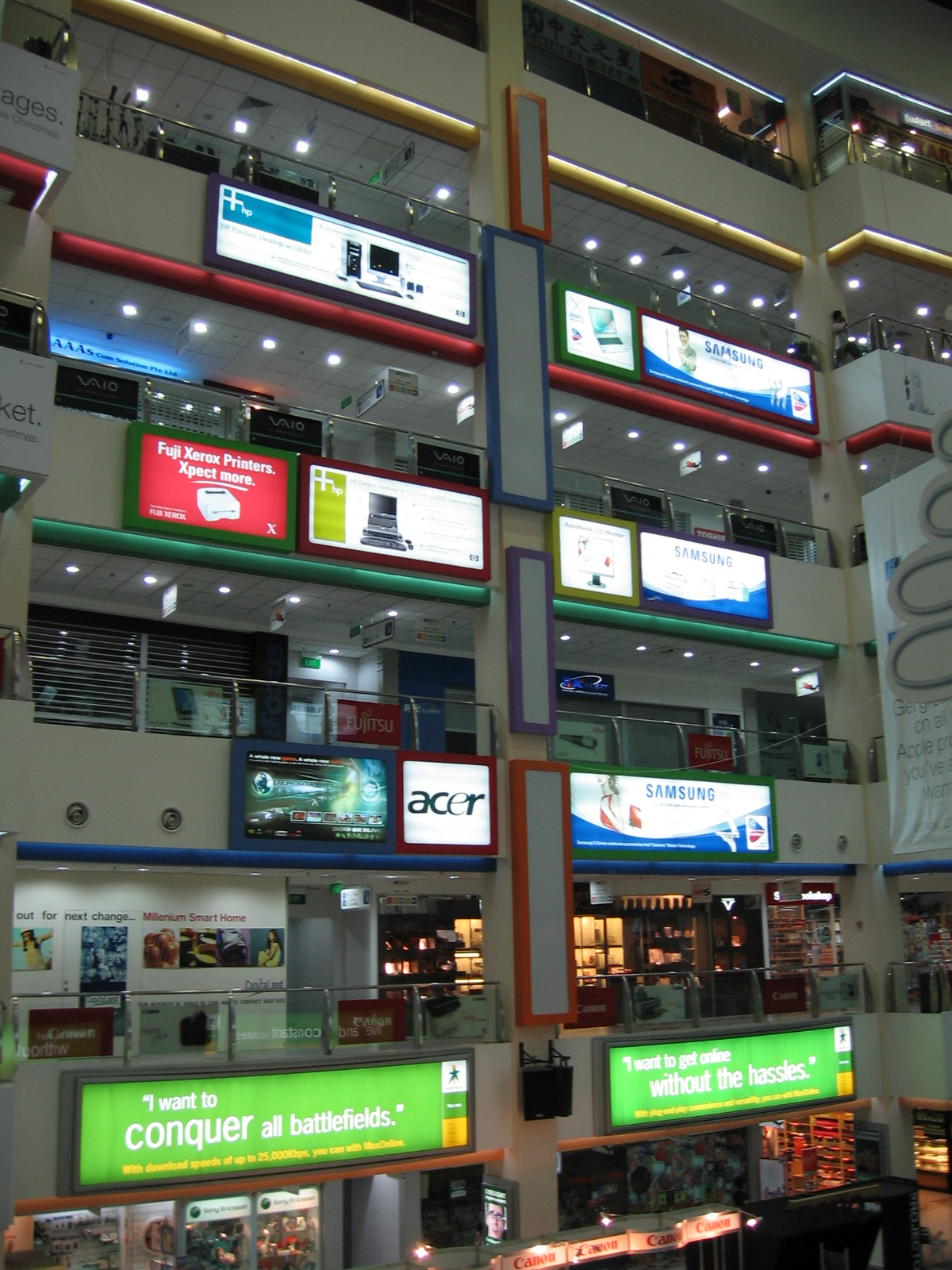

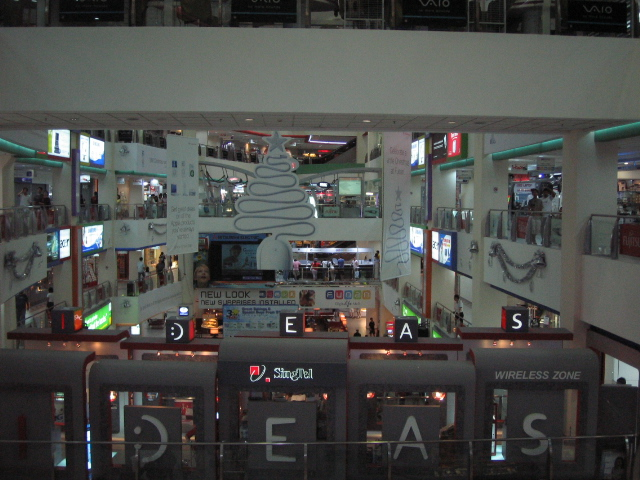

== Transportation ==
The nearest MRT Station to Funan DigtaLife Mall is City Hall MRT station (NS25/EW13).
