= The Side Show (nightclub) =

Nightclub in Cape Town, South Africa

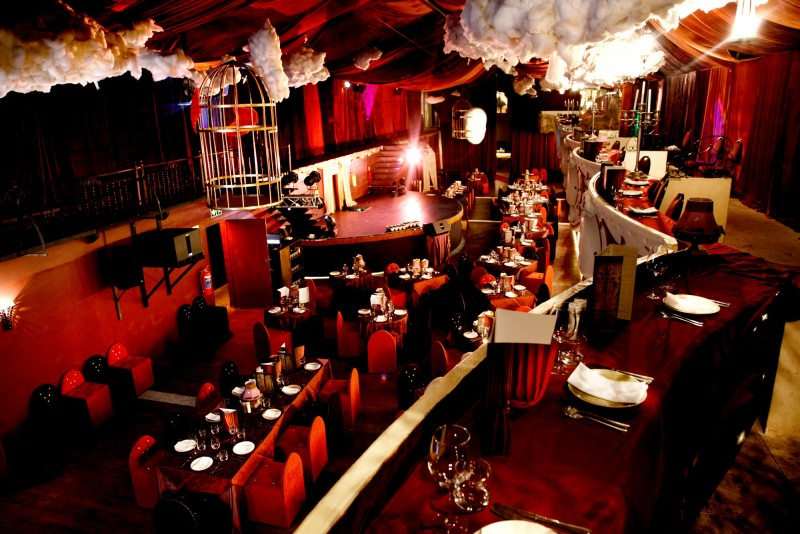
The Side Show Restaurant

The Side Show (formerly known as The Fez) is a Moroccan-themed nightclub located on Mechau Street, Cape Town, South Africa.

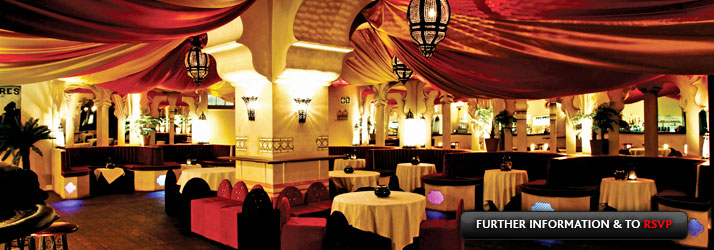
The Side Show Cape Town VIP Lounge

The nightclub consists of four bars, a Bedouin-covered smoking deck, a VIP balcony, a VIP section, and carousel-styled booths that run along the main dance floor.

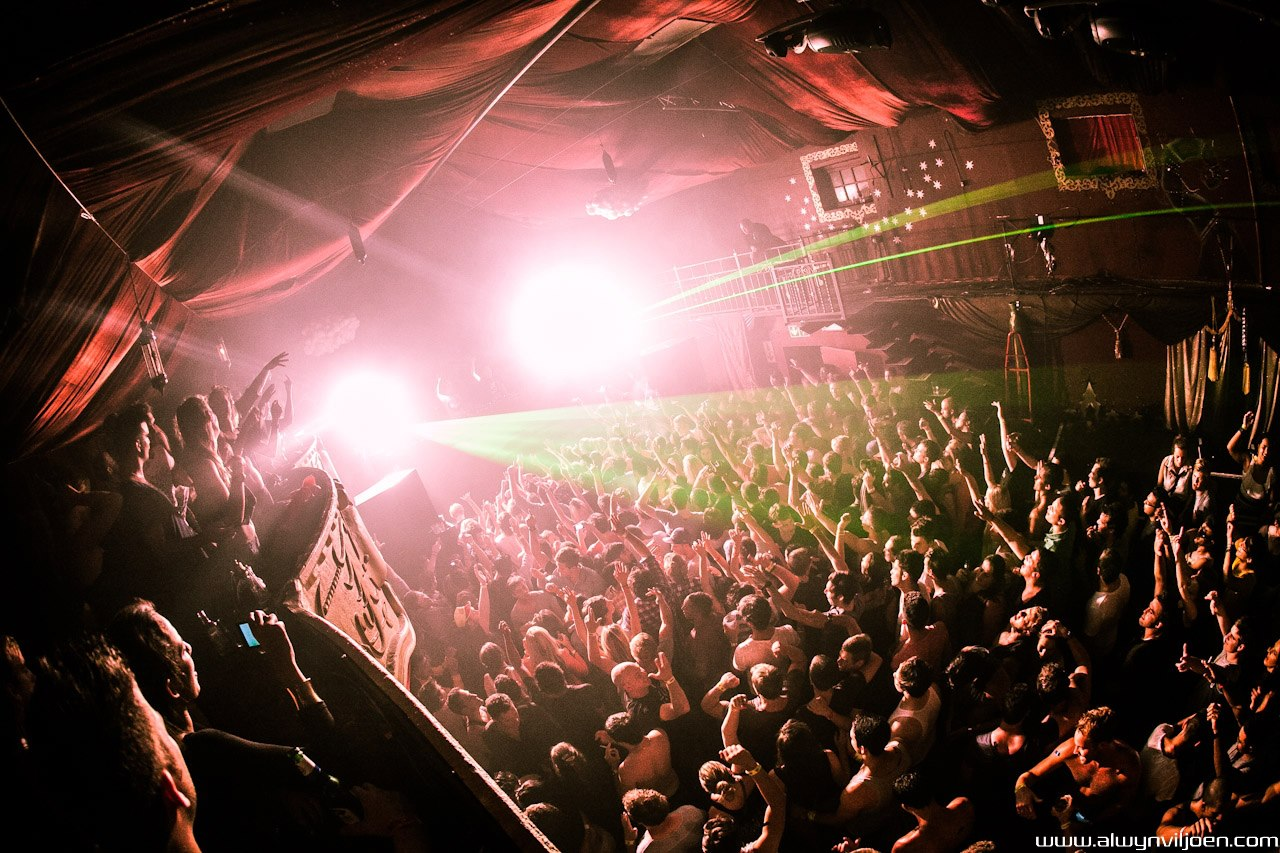
The Side Show in Cape Town's main dance floor

The Side Show hosted Nervo – the DJ twins, Tomorrowland DJs (Dimitri Vegas and Like Mike, German Superstar Trance Producer Neelix) "The official Playboy Launch", "The Sports Illustrated Official After Parties", the prestigious Global Party brand, and several internationals such as Orca, Hed Kandi and Soul Candi Brands.
