= List of music venues in Canada =

1,000+ capacity music venues in Canada

This is a list of notable music venues in Canada. Venues with a capacity of 1,000 or higher are included.

== List ==
Opened	Venue	City	Capacity
Alberta (AB)
1955	Southern Alberta Jubilee Auditorium	Calgary	2,538
October 15, 1983	Scotiabank Saddledome	Calgary	19,800
1974	GMC Stadium	Calgary	25,000
August 1960	McMahon Stadium	Calgary	46,020
1985	Jack Singer Concert Hall	Calgary	1,797
1987	WinSport Event Center	Calgary	4,000
unknown	WinSport Amphitheatre	Calgary	15,000
unknown	Chief Jim Starlight Center	Calgary	5,000
1959; renovated 2017	Big Four Roadhouse	Calgary	4,300
2014	Grey Eagle Casino Event Centre	Calgary	2,511 (Reserved); 3,000 (General admission)
1985	Heritage Amphitheatre	Edmonton	2,900
2019	Midway	Edmonton	1,300
1983	Francis Winspear Centre for Music	Edmonton	1,716
1955	Northern Alberta Jubilee Auditorium	Edmonton	2,538
April 17, 1984 (expanded 2009)	Edmonton Expo Centre Arena	Edmonton	4,200
1983	Universiade Pavilion	Edmonton	5,500
September 8, 2016	Rogers Place	Edmonton	20,743
1978	Commonwealth Stadium	Edmonton	56,000
June 22, 1983	Edmonton Convention Centre	Edmonton	5,000
1980	Centrefire Place	Fort McMurray	2,000
1995	Bonnetts Energy Centre	Grande Prairie	4,500 (Arena); 1,400 (The Bowes)
2010	Grande Prairie Alliance Church	Grande Prairie	1,156
September 12, 1974	VisitLethbridge.com Arena	Lethbridge	5,900 (Arena); 2,928 (Theatre); 1,100 (Small theatre)
October 2015	Co-op Place	Medicine Hat	7,000
unknown	Cypress Centre	Medicine Hat	1,726
unknown	CrossRoads Church	Red Deer	1,100
2018	Westerner Park Exhibition Hall	Red Deer	3,000
Unknown	Prairie Pavilion	Red Deer	2,650 (General Admission); 2,340(Reserved)
Unknown	Neeralta Pavilion	Red Deer	3,097
1991	Marchant Crane Centrium	Red Deer	7,819
2023	Red Deer Events Centre	Red Deer	2,000
unknown	Parkland Pavilion	Red Deer	2,200
British Columbia (BC)
May 2009	Rogers Forum	Abbotsford	8,500
Unknown	Central Heights Church Worship Centre	Abbotsford	1,100
Unknown	Gateway Community Church Auditorium	Abbotsford	1,120
2004	Chilliwack Coliseum	Chilliwack	6,000
2004	The Q Centre	Colwood	3,779
2000	Western Financial Place	Cranbrook	5,928
March 2008	Ovintiv Events Centre	Dawson Creek	6,500
unknown	Cowichan Community Centre	Duncan	2,400
August 8, 1992	Sandman Centre	Kamloops	6,588
August 28, 1999	Prospera Place	Kelowna	8,000
unknown	Laketown Ranch	Lake Cowichan	16,000 (Main stage); 4,000 (Lakenight Stage); 2,000 (Flats Stage)
October 1983	Frank Crane Arena	Nanaimo	4,155
September 2008	South Okanagan Events Centre	Penticton	6,432
September 30, 1995	CN Centre	Prince George	7,000
February 11, 1994	Prince George Civic Centre	Prince George	2,000
2024	West Fraser Centre	Quesnel	1,500
September 28, 1978	Farquhar Auditorium	Saanich	1,228
unknown	Rogers Rink	Salmon Arm	2,200
unknown	Bell Performing Arts Centre	Surrey	1,062
October 2001	Kal Tire Place	Vernon	5,103
1941	Vogue Theatre	Vancouver	1,150
July 1959	Queen Elizabeth Theatre	Vancouver	2,765
November 7, 1927	Orpheum	Vancouver	2,780
1963	PNE Agrodome	Vancouver	5,000
2026	Freedom Mobile Arch	Vancouver	10,000
July 7, 2008	Thunderbird Sports Centre	Vancouver	7,200
January 8, 1968 (renovated in 1984 and 2007)	Pacific Coliseum	Vancouver	17,713
September 21, 1995	Rogers Arena	Vancouver	18,910
June 19, 1983	BC Place	Vancouver	54,500
1931	PNE Forum	Vancouver	3,900
1997	Chan Centre for the Performing Arts	Vancouver	1,365 (Chan Shun Concert Hall)
unknown	Harbour Convention Centre	Vancouver	2,452
unknown	The Centre at Vancouver for the Performing Arts	Vancouver	1,820
1934	Malkin Bowl	Vancouver	2,000
1913	Royal Theatre	Victoria	1,416
March 26, 2005	Save-On-Foods Memorial Centre	Victoria	9,000
Saskatchewan (SK)
August 19, 2011	Temple Gardens Centre	Moose Jaw	5,000
1970	Conexus Arts Centre	Regina	2,030
October 2, 1977	Brandt Centre	Regina	7,130
July 1, 2017	Mosaic Stadium	Regina	40,000
1913	Coors Event Centre	Saskatoon	1,000
2008	World Trade Centre Hall C	Saskatoon	1,536
2006	World Trade Centre Halls D and E	Saskatoon	4,452 (Hall D); 5,184 (Hall E); 9,636 (Halls D and E combined)
unknown	Prairieland Park Grandstand	Saskatoon	9,000
April 1, 1968	Sid Buckwold Theatre	Saskatoon	2,074
February 9, 1988	SaskTel Centre	Saskatoon	15,195
Manitoba (MB)
April 2, 1973	Assiniboine Credit Union Place	Brandon	5,915 (Arena); 2,493 (Theatre)
1982	Manitoba Room	Brandon	1,700
unknown	Fusion Credit Union Stage	Brandon	3,000
1907 (reopened 1991)	Burton Cummings Theatre	Winnipeg	1,638
November 16, 2004	Canada Life Centre	Winnipeg	16,345 (Arena); 3,440 (Theatre)
May 26, 2013	IG Field	Winnipeg	33,422
March 25, 1968	Centennial Concert Hall	Winnipeg	2,305
1975	RBC Convention Centre	Winnipeg	5,600 (Hall A); 7,800 (Halls A and B)
unknown	Central Park Amphitheatre	Winnipeg	5,000
2014	Club Regent Event Centre	Winnipeg	1,400
Ontario (ON)
December 31, 1995	Sadlon Arena	Barrie	4,700
1998	CAA Centre	Brampton	5,000
1919; restored late 1980s	The Sanderson Centre	Brantford	1,125
1967	TD Civic Centre	Brantford	4,000
1950	Chatham Memorial Arena	Chatham-Kent	3,000
1930	Capitol Theatre	Chatham-Kent	1,208
1976	Ed Lumley Arena	Cornwall	5,800
1970	Alumni Stadium	Guelph	12,500
October 6, 2000	Sleeman Centre	Guelph	5,000 (End stage); 6,300 (Centre stage)
1973	FirstOntario Concert Hall	Hamilton	2,193
November 30, 1985	TD Coliseum	Hamilton	19,000
September 1, 2014	Hamilton Stadium	Hamilton	23,218
1971	McIntyre Performing Arts Centre	Hamilton	1,029
unknown	Legacy Hall	Huntsville	1,222
February 22, 2008	Slush Puppie Place	Kingston	6,700
2019	Richardson Stadium	Kingston	12,000
September 1980	Raffi Armenian Theatre	Kitchener	2,047
May 24, 1951	Dom Cardillo Arena	Kitchener	9,036
unknown	On the Grand Amphitheatre	Kitchener	30,000
2015	Sunset Amphitheatre	Leamington	6,000
June 21, 1967	Centennial Hall	London	1,637 (Seated); 2,200 (General Admission)
1971	Thompson Recreation and Athletics Centre	London	5,315
2018	Siskinds LLP Stage	London	4,000
October 11, 2002	Canada Life Place	London	10,200 (Centre stage); 9,100(End stage)
unknown	Harris Park	London	20,000
1950; rebuilt 1990	Victoria Park	London	20,000
unknown	London Music Hall	London	1,600
1968	Alumni Hall	London	2,274
2022	OLG Stage at Fallsview Casino	Niagara Falls	5,000
2004	Avalon Theatre	Niagara Falls	1,559
1955	Boart Longyear Memorial Gardens	North Bay	5,000
July 31, 1996	Casino Rama Entertainment Centre	Orillia	5,000
1984	Burl's Creek Event Grounds	Oro-Medonte	100,000
October 1998	Mississauga Sports and Entertainment Centre	Mississauga	6,000 (Centre stage); 4,800 (End stage)
May 31, 1969	Southam Hall	Ottawa	2,065
December 29, 1967	TD Place Arena	Ottawa	10,585
January 15, 1996	Canadian Tire Centre	Ottawa	20,500
1908	TD Place Stadium	Ottawa	24,000
2024	Hard Rock Live Ottawa	Ottawa	2,200 (General admission); 1,900 (Reserved)
2011	EY Centre	Ottawa	10,400
2026	History Ottawa	Ottawa	2,000
1928	Bronson Centre	Ottawa	1000
2005	LeBreton Flats Park	Ottawa	40,000
1983	J.D. McArthur Arena	Owen Sound	3,804
1951	Pembroke Memorial Centre	Pembroke	3,643
1956	Peterborough Memorial Centre	Peterborough	5,501 (Centre stage); 4,559 (End stage); 2,380 (Theatre)
October 11, 2014	Meridian Centre	St. Catharines	6,900
September 1967	Ennis Auditorium	Welland	1,052
1995	Progressive Auto Sales Arena	Sarnia	6,000
2006	GFL Memorial Gardens	Sault Ste. Marie	5,802
2000s	Roberta Bondar Park	Sault Ste. Marie	1,750
1957	Festival Theatre	Stratford	1,800
1901	Avon Theatre	Stratford	1,010
unknown	Grace Hartman Amphitheatre	Sudbury	1,961
1951	Sudbury Community Arena	Sudbury	5,100
October 16, 1985	Thunder Bay Community Auditorium	Thunder Bay	1,497
March 6, 1951	Fort William Gardens	Thunder Bay	4,680
2008	Fort William Amphitheatre	Thunder Bay	50,000
June 3, 1989	Rogers Centre	Toronto	55,000
29 June 2025	Rogers Stadium	Toronto	50,000
February 19, 1999	Scotiabank Arena	Toronto	19,800 (Arena); 5,200 (Theatre)
May 18, 1995	RBC Amphitheatre	Toronto	17,000
December 16, 1921	Coca-Cola Coliseum	Toronto	9,200
2004	Sobeys Stadium	Toronto	9,100
2024	The Theatre at Great Canadian Toronto	Toronto	5,000
2011	RBC Echo Beach	Toronto	4,000
1920	Meridian Hall	Toronto	3,200
1894	Massey Hall	Toronto	2,700
1982	Roy Thomson Hall	Toronto	2,600
2021	History	Toronto	2,600
2016	Rebel	Toronto	2,500
1913	Elgin Theatre	Toronto	1,538
June 14, 2006	R. Fraser Elliott Hall	Toronto	2,071
1992	Harbourfront Centre	Toronto	2,071
1907	Convocation Hall	Toronto	1,700
1993	Meridian Arts Centre	Toronto	1,700
1913	Winter Garden Theatre	Toronto	982
1919	Danforth Music Hall	Toronto	1,400
1991	Phoenix Concert Theatre	Toronto	1,350
1956	Queen Elizabeth Theatre	Toronto	1,250
January 1, 1918	Masonic Temple Concert Hall	Toronto	1,200
2009	Koerner Hall	Toronto	1,100
1994	Sun Life Financial Arena	Waterloo	6,100
2009	Waterloo Public Square	Waterloo	2,500
2022	Canada Events Centre	Whitby	3,000
2008	WFCU Centre	Windsor	6,871 (Arena); 3,241 (Theatre)
June 2008	Colosseum at Caesars Windsor	Windsor	5,000
unknown	Chrysler Theatre	Windsor	1,200
Prince Edward Island (PEI)
1964; restored 2014	Confederation Centre of the Arts	Charlottetown	1,100
1990	Eastlink Centre	Charlottetown	4,717
Quebec (QC)
2011	Centre d'Excellence Sports Rousseau	Boisbriand	4,500
unknown	Amphitheatre Fernand Lindsay	Joliette	7,000
2017	Place Bell	Laval	10,000
March 16, 1996	Bell Centre	Montreal	21,105 (Centre stage); 19,200(End stage); 14,000(Amphitheatre)
1967	Théâtre Maisonneuve	Montreal	1,453
1884	MTELUS	Montreal	2,350 (General Admission); 1,100 (Reserved)
February 7, 1926	Olympia Theatre	Montreal	2,438
1874	Parc Jean-Drapeau	Montreal	65,000 (Espace 67)
July 17, 1976	Olympic Stadium	Montreal	66,308
1894	Monument-National	Montreal	1,600
1963	Salle Wilfrid-Pelletier	Montreal	2,982
November 28, 1939	Verdun Auditorium	Montreal	3,795
1980's	Théâtre Saint-Denis 1	Montreal	2,218
2021	Centre Slush Puppie	Gatineau	4,000
unknown	Theatre du Casino Lac-Leamy	Gatineau	1,600
unknown	Theatre du Palais Municipal	Saguenay	2,100
1948	Palais des Sports de Saguenay	Saguenay	3,500
1949	Centre Georges-Vezina	Saguenay	4,749
1973	Salle Maurice-O'Bready	Sherbrooke	1,501
1966	Colisée Financière Sun Life	Rimouski	5,061
1938	Colisée Jean-Guy Talbot	Trois-Rivières	3,500
July 2015	Amphithéâtre Cogeco	Trois-Rivières	9,000
2021	Colisée Vidéotron	Trois-Rivières	5,990
1903	Capitole de Québec	Quebec City	1,106
1931	Pavillon Guy-Lafleur	Quebec City	5,000
September 15, 2015	Centre Vidéotron	Quebec City	19,000
1750s	Plains of Abraham	Quebec City	75,000
1971; Rebuilt 2020	Grand Théâtre de Québec	Quebec City	1,885
unknown	Centre des Congres de Québec	Quebec City	7,500
unknown	Centre de Foires du Quebec	Quebec City	17,500
unknown	Place Jean-Beliveau	Quebec City	10,000
1982	Salle Albert-Rousseau	Quebec City	1,338
1984	Agora du Vieux-Port	Quebec City	5,000
1980	Colisée Desjardins	Victoriaville	5,000
Nova Scotia (NS)
February 1978	Scotiabank Centre	Halifax	13,000
1749	Halifax Common	Halifax	80,000
1927	Halifax Forum	Halifax	5,860
Unknown	Multipurpose Centre	Halifax	2,200
November 1971	Rebecca Cohn Auditorium	Halifax	1,052
1856	Garrison Grounds	Halifax	30,000
1982	Zatzman Sportsplex	Dartmouth	4,500
May 1999	Alderney Landing Events Plaza	Dartmouth	8,000
1988	Centre 200	Sydney	6,500
March 12, 2013	Rath Eastlink Community Centre	Truro	3,588
1988	Andrew H. McCain Arena	Wolfville	3,100
1925	Convocation Hall	Wolfville	1,466
New Brunswick (NB)
1990	TD Station	Saint John	7,600
unknown	Saint John Trade and Convention Centre	Saint John	2,300
1973	Moncton Coliseum	Moncton	7,200
2018	Avenir Centre	Moncton	10,000
1984	Magnetic Hill Concert Site	Moncton	75,000
2008	Moncton Wesleyan Celebration Centre	Moncton	1,874
2010	Croix-Bleue Medavie Stadium	Moncton	25,000
2010	Molson Canadian Centre	Moncton	2,500 (General Admission); 2,100 (Reserved)
1966	Convocation Hall	Sackville	1,500
October 2017	Centre Jean-Daigle	Edmundston	3,700
1976	Aitken University Centre	Fredericton	4,666 (Full Arena); 2,998 (3/4 house); 2,301 (half-house); 1,911 (1/4 house)
1996	K.C. Irving Regional Centre	Bathurst	4,400
Newfoundland (NL)
2001	Mary Brown's Centre	St. John's	7,000
1962; restored 2000s	Holy Heart Theatre	St. John's	1,100
2017; rebuilt 2022	Iceberg Alley Performance Tent	St. John's	3,800 (General Admission; 921 permanent bleacher seats)
2025	JAG Hotel Soundhouse	St. John's	1,500

== Gallery ==
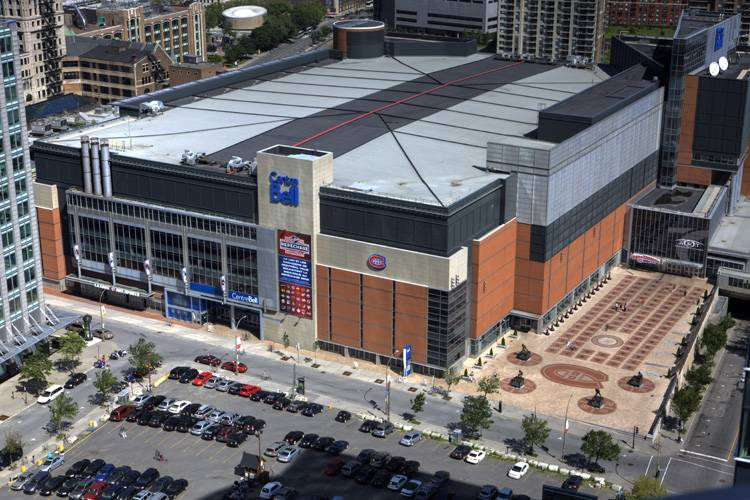
Bell Centre

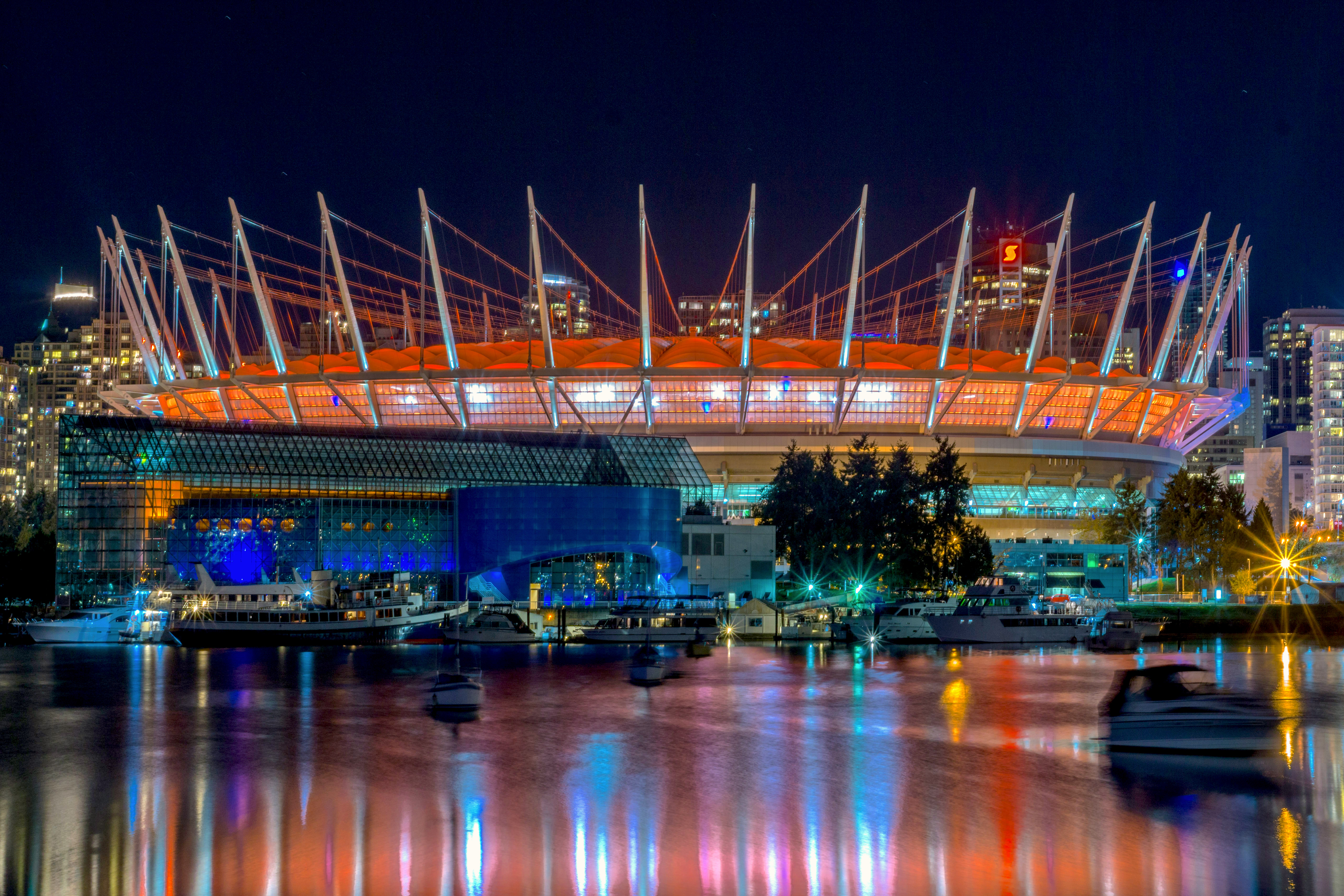
BC Place

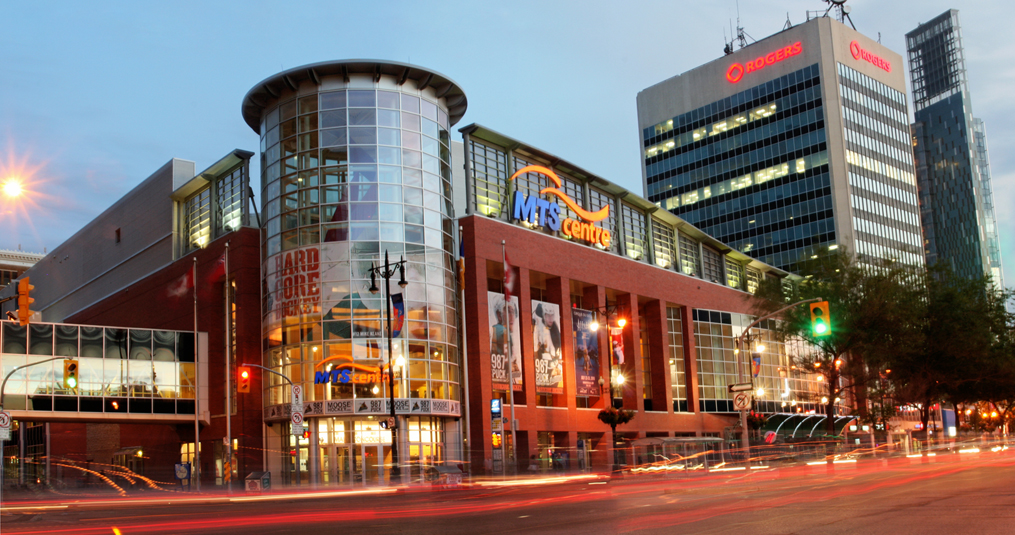
Canada Life Centre

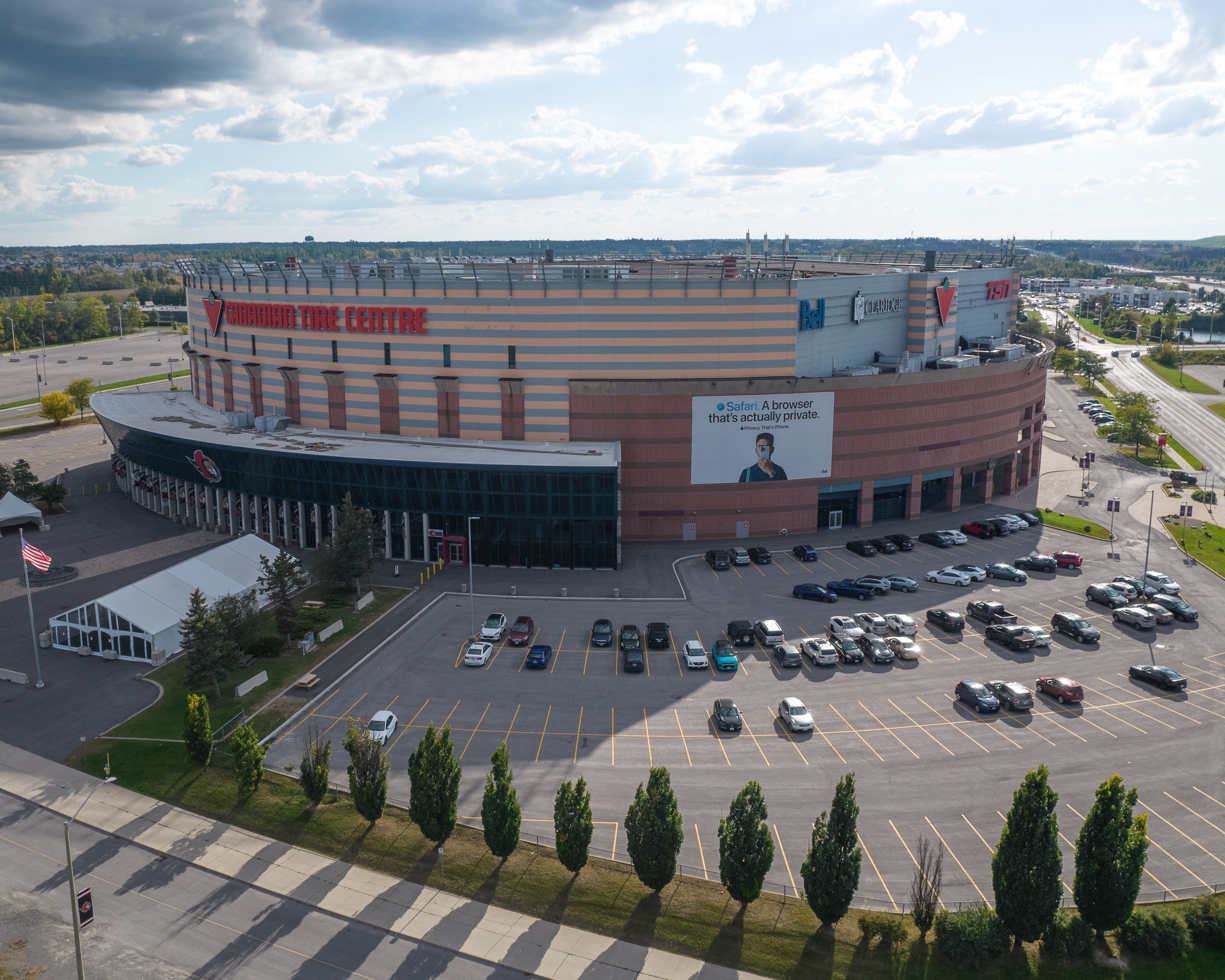
Canadian Tire Centre

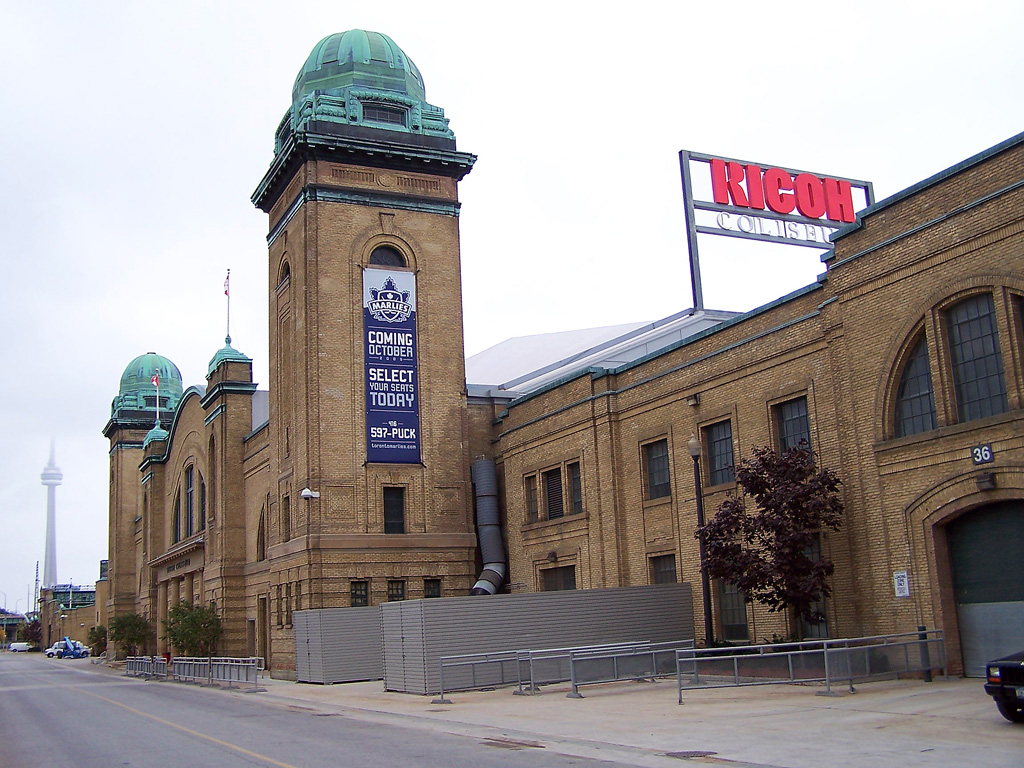
Coca-Cola Coliseum

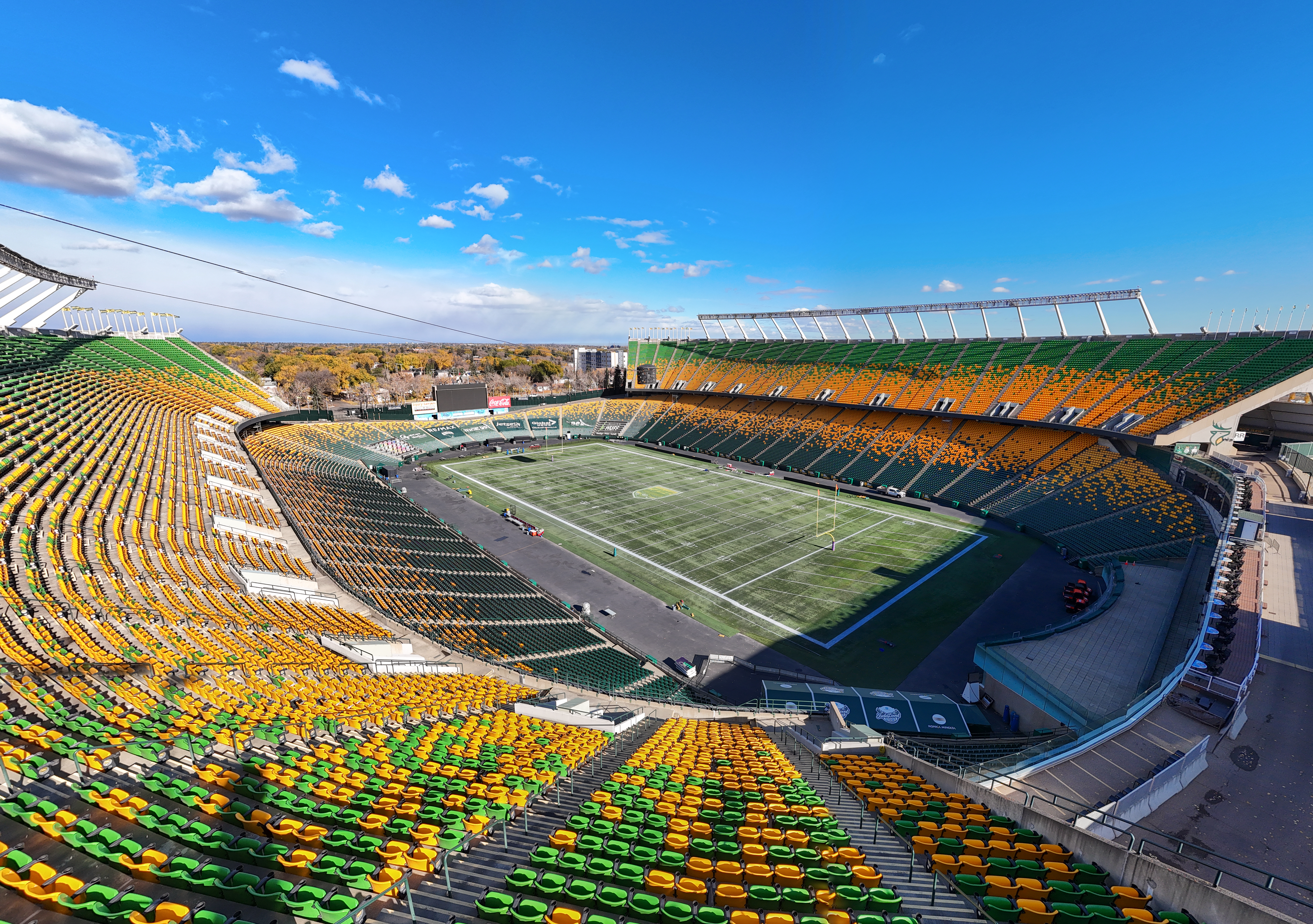
Commonwealth Stadium

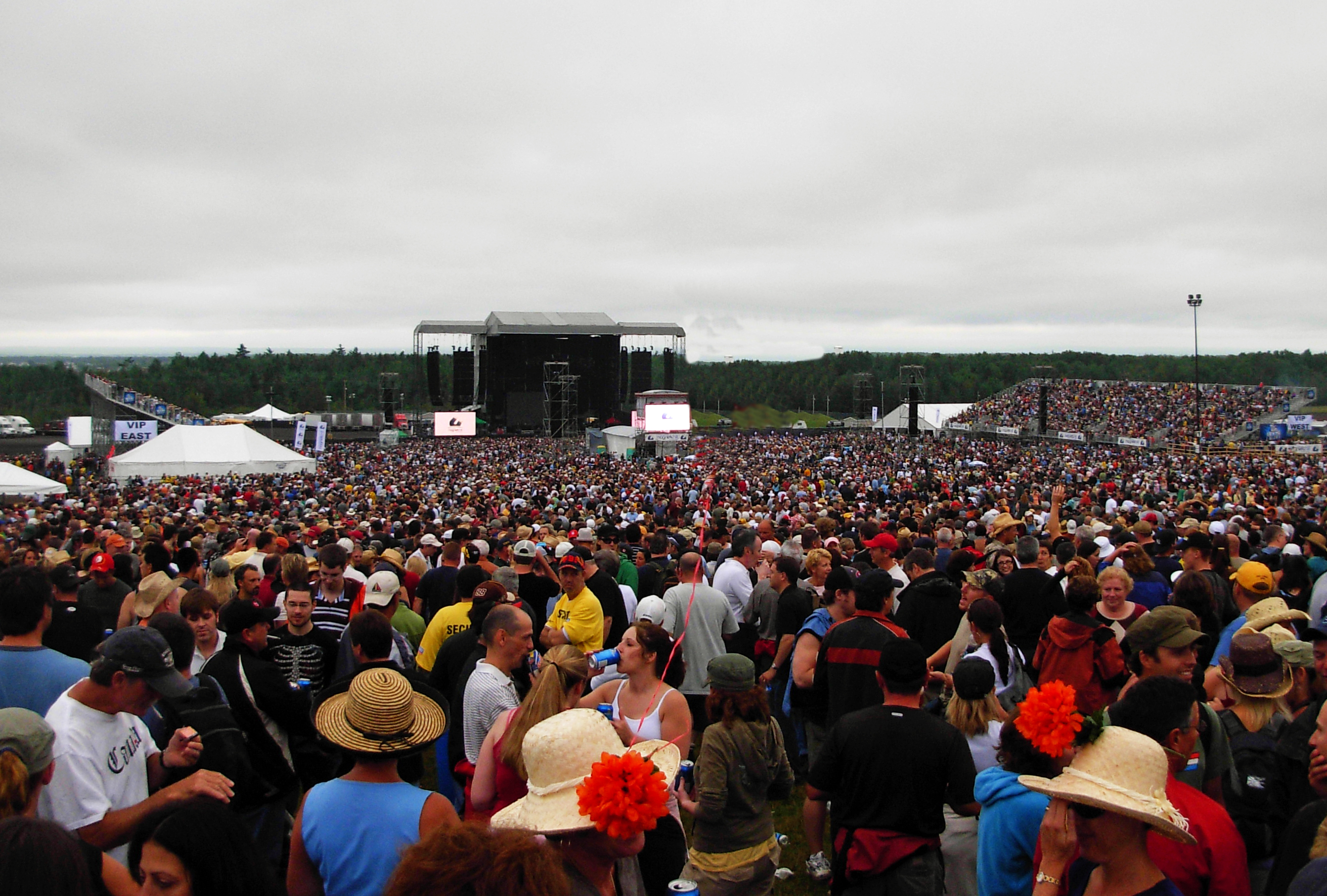
Magnetic Hill Concert Site

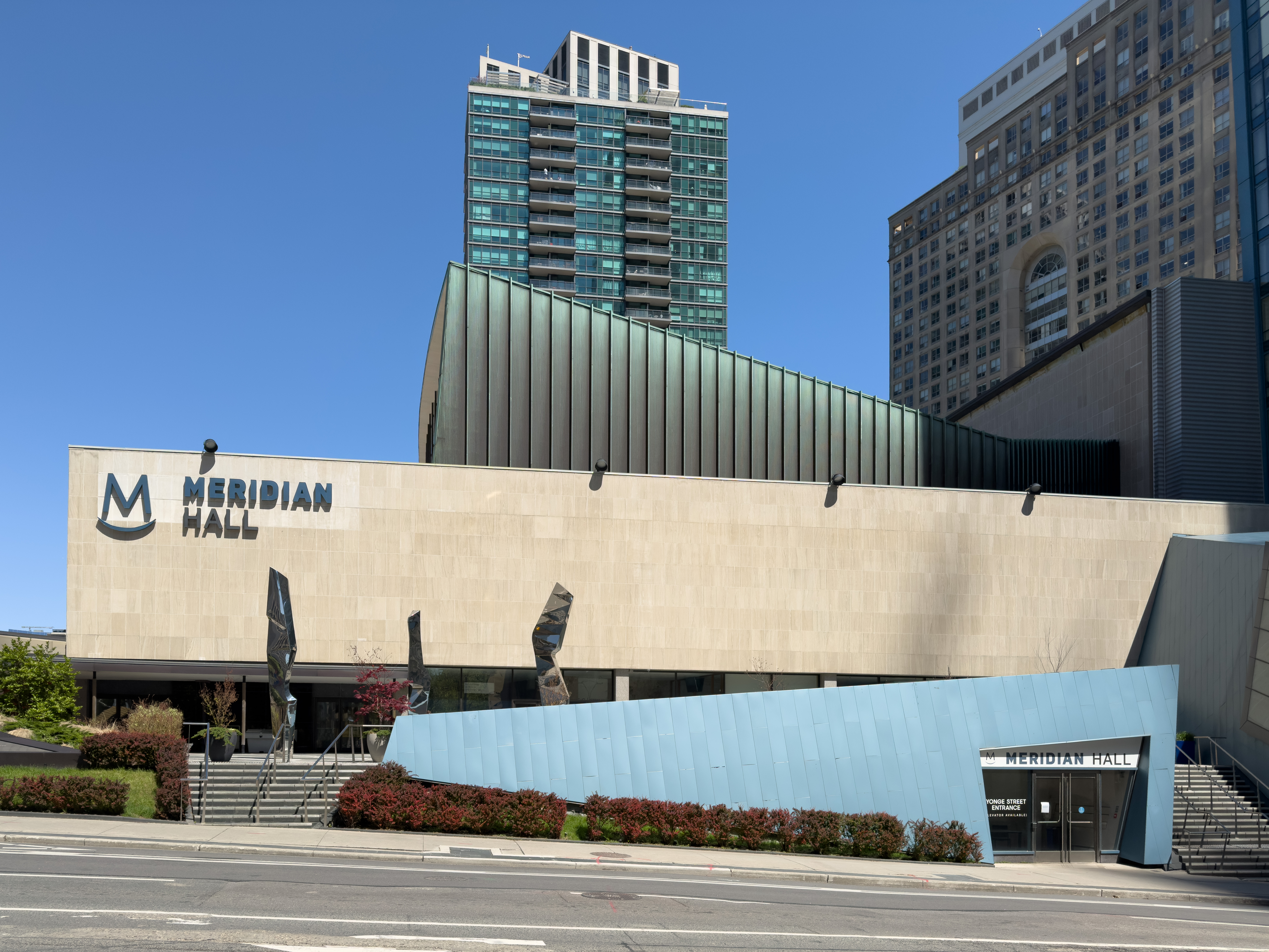
Meridian Hall

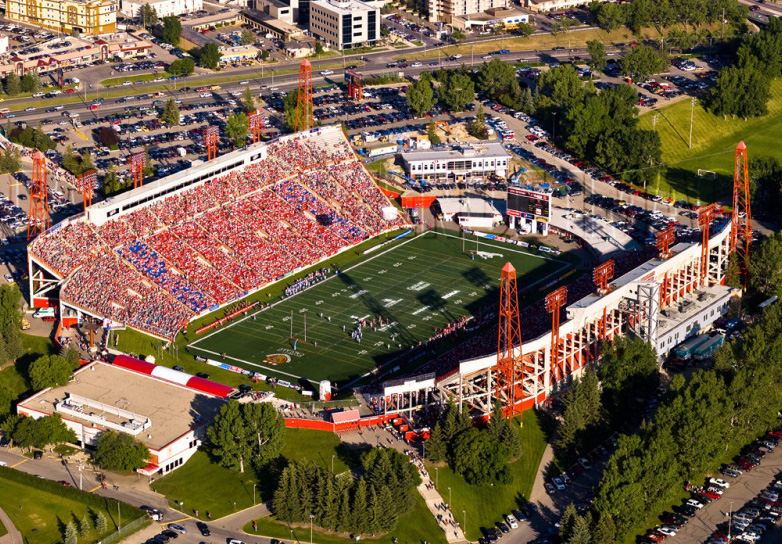
McMahon Stadium

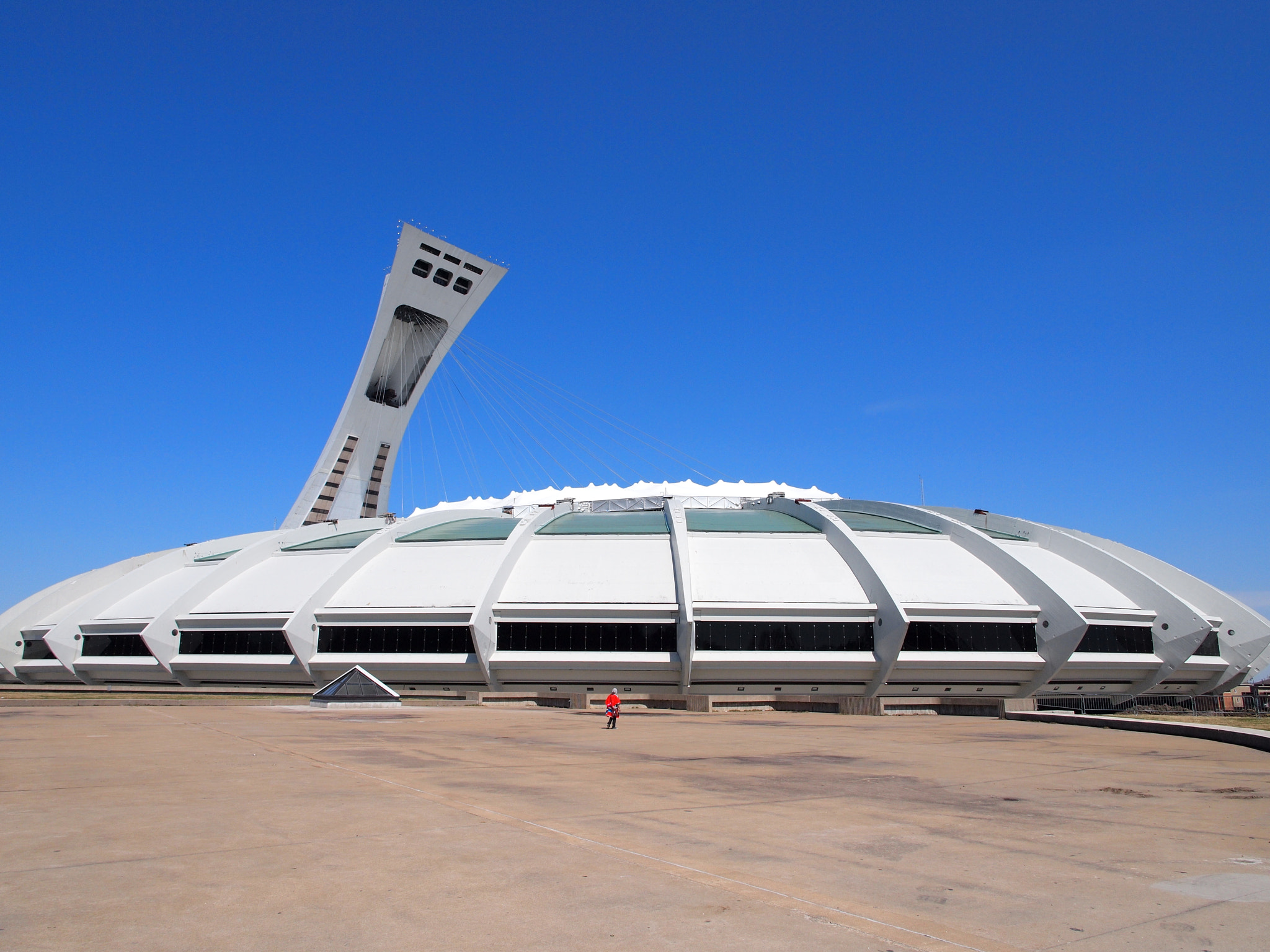
Olympic Stadium

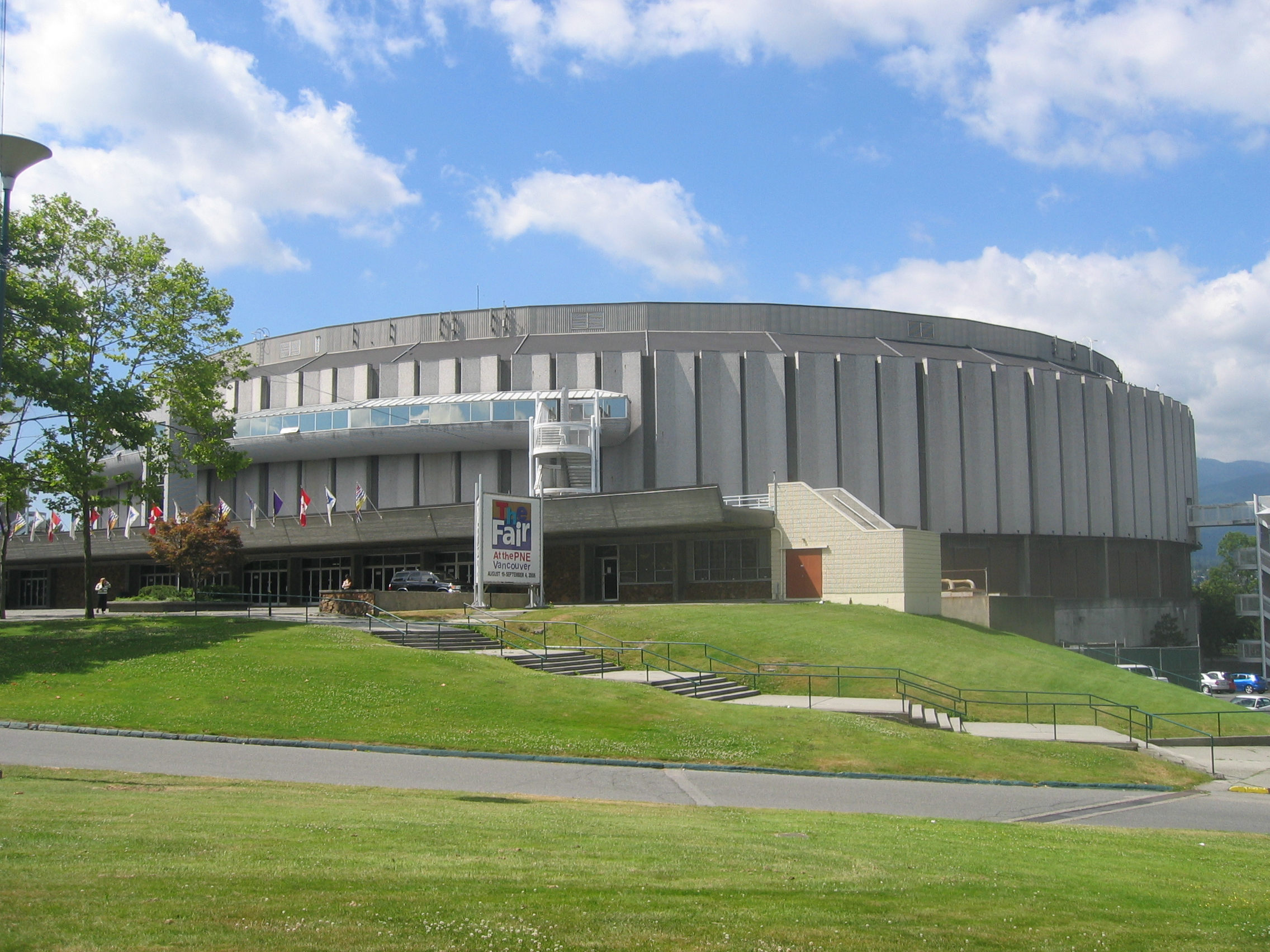
Pacific Coliseum

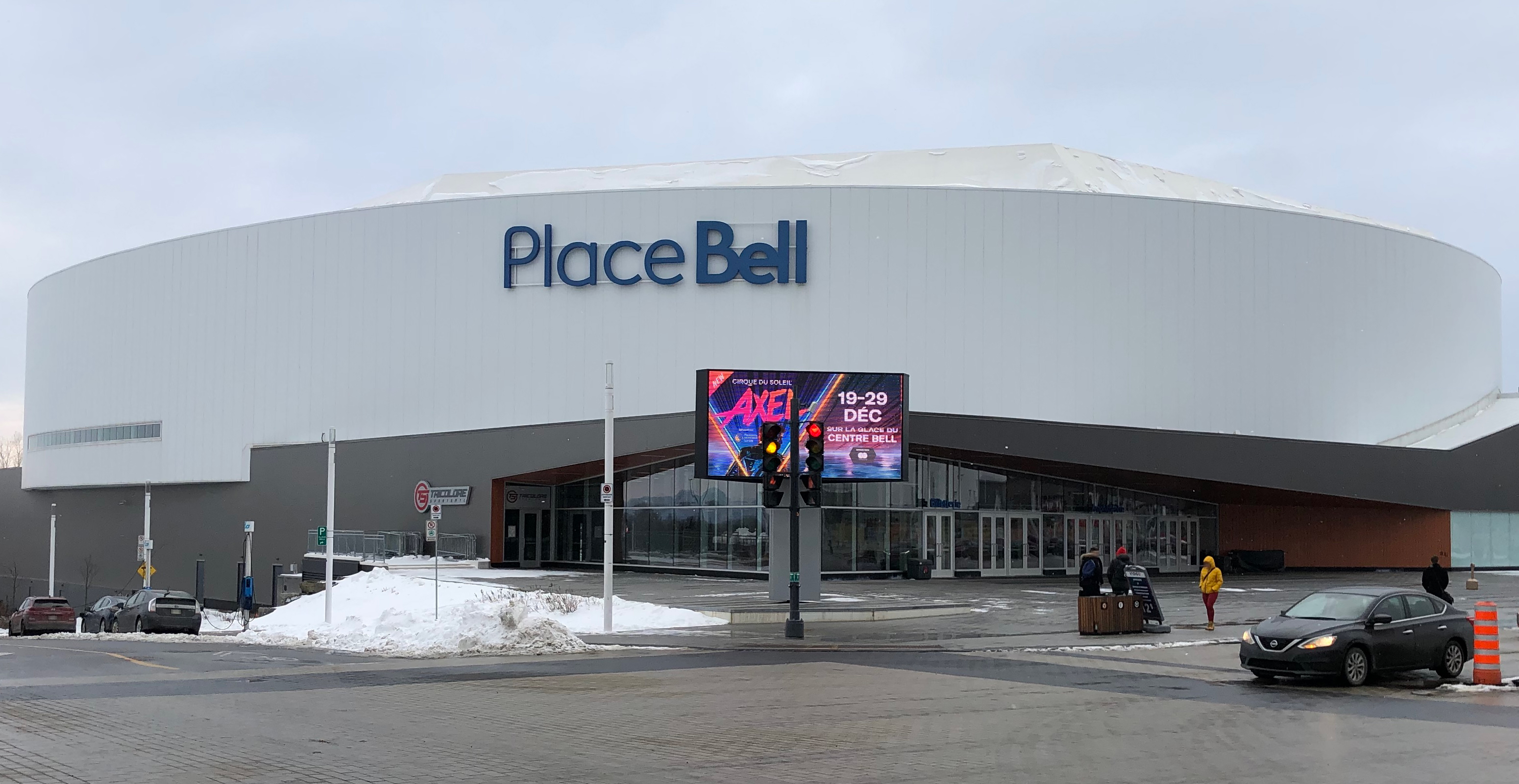
Place Bell

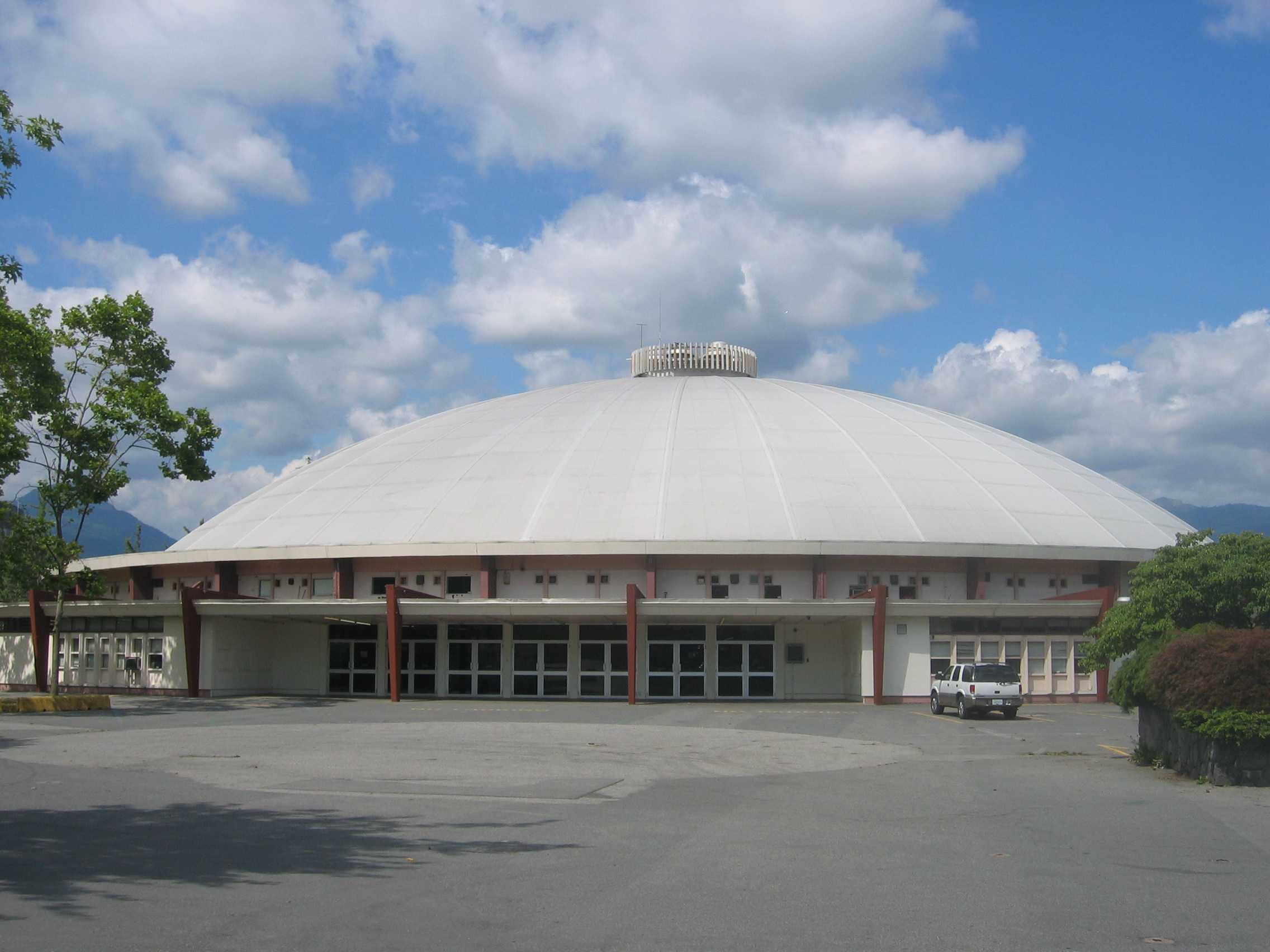
PNE Agrodome

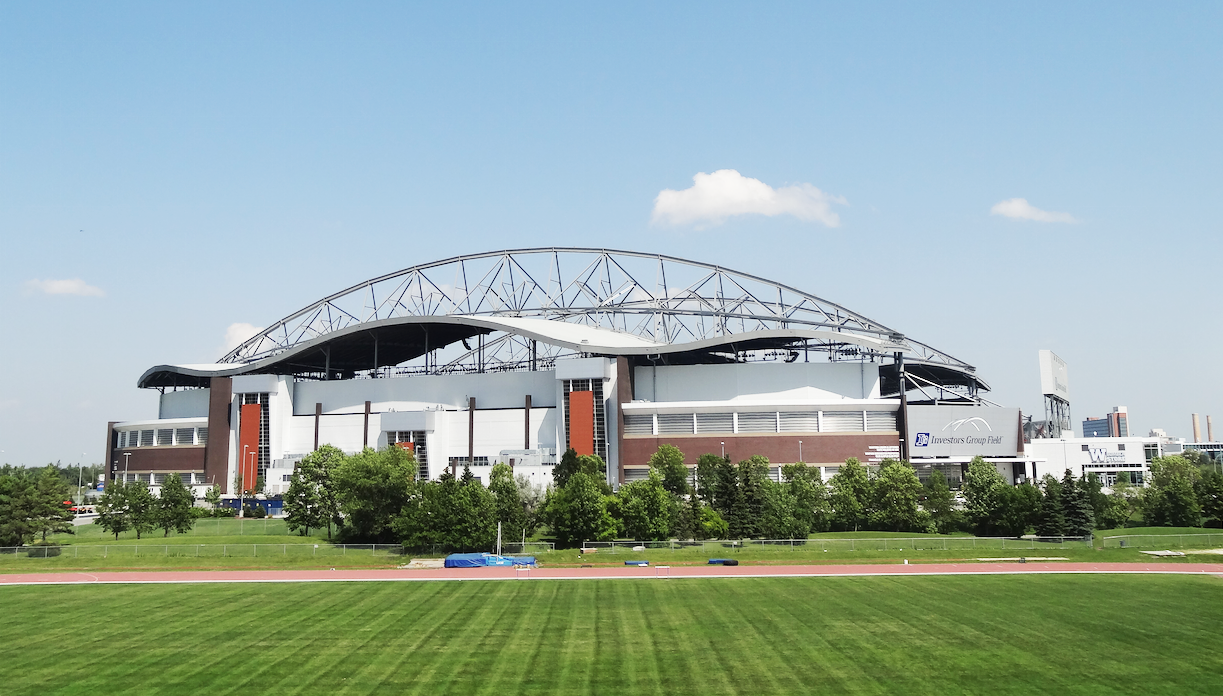
Princess Auto Stadium

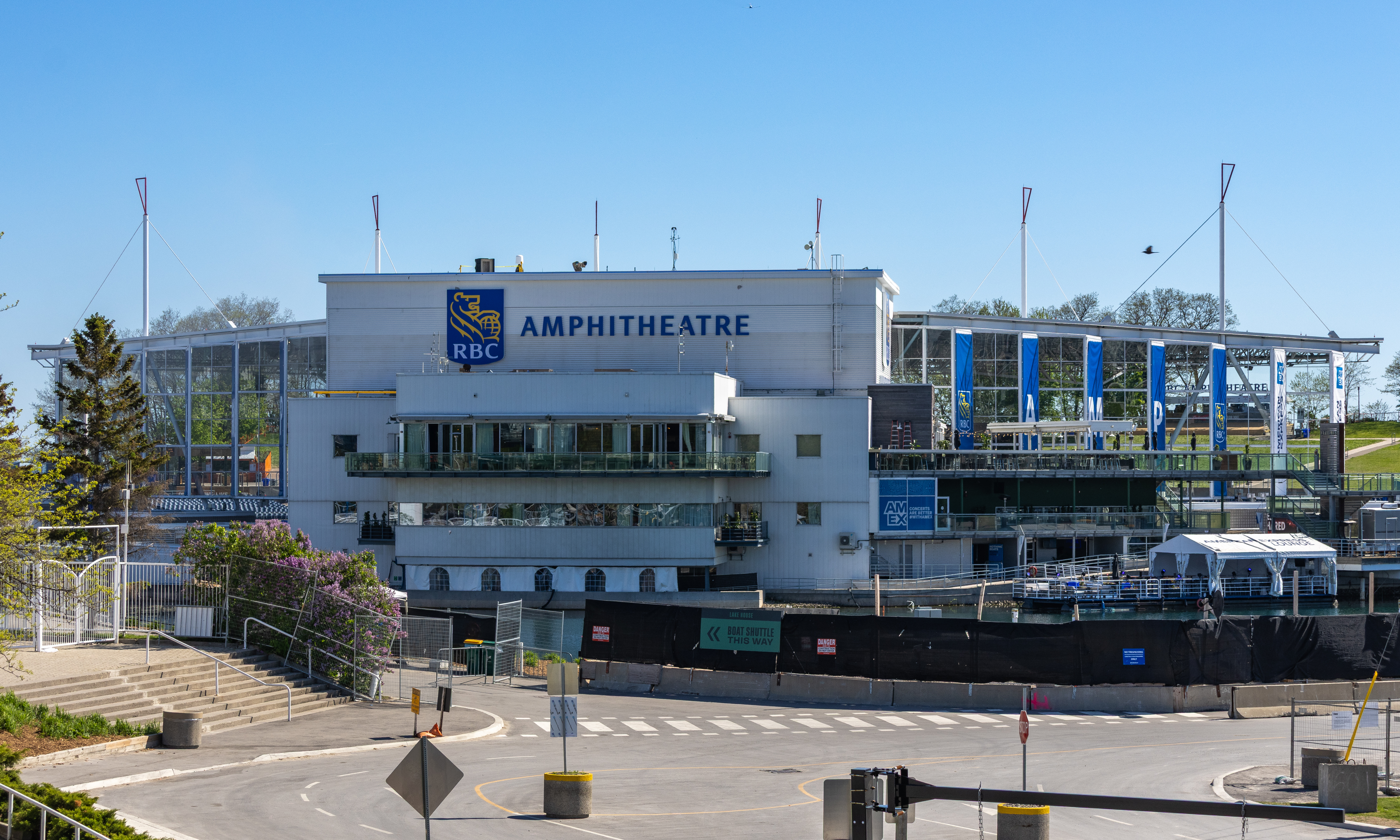
RBC Amphitheatre

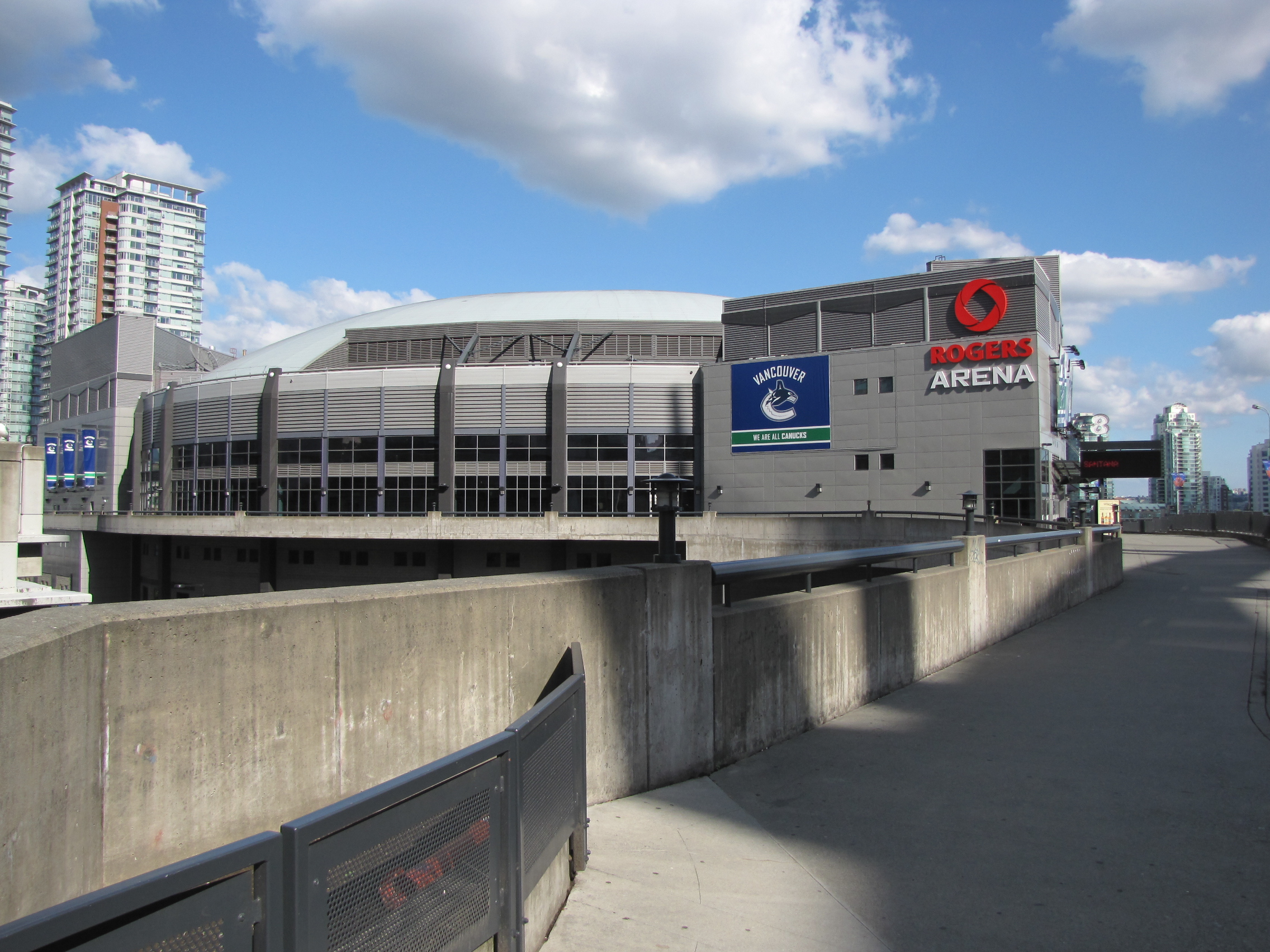
Rogers Arena

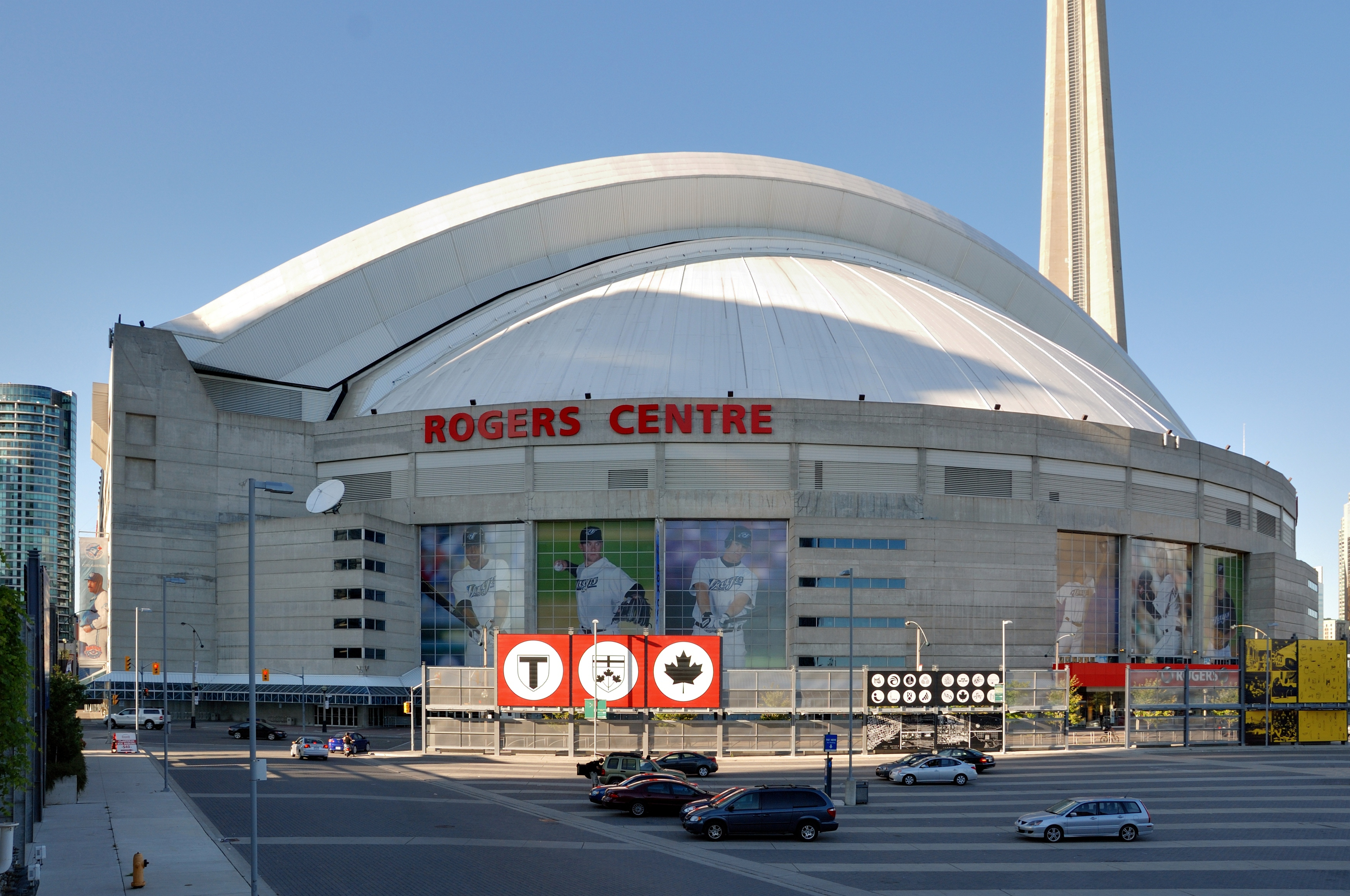
Rogers Centre

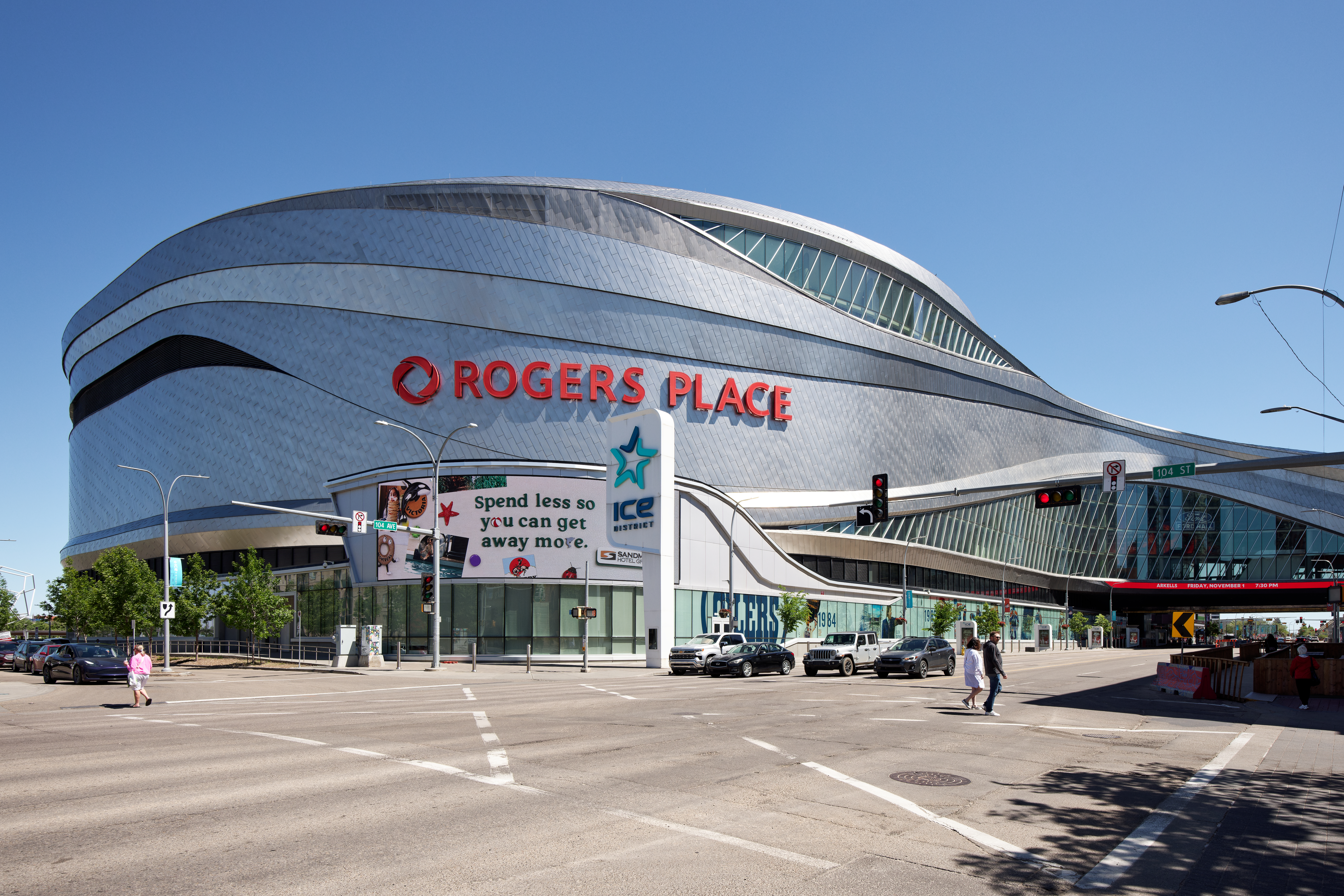
Rogers Place

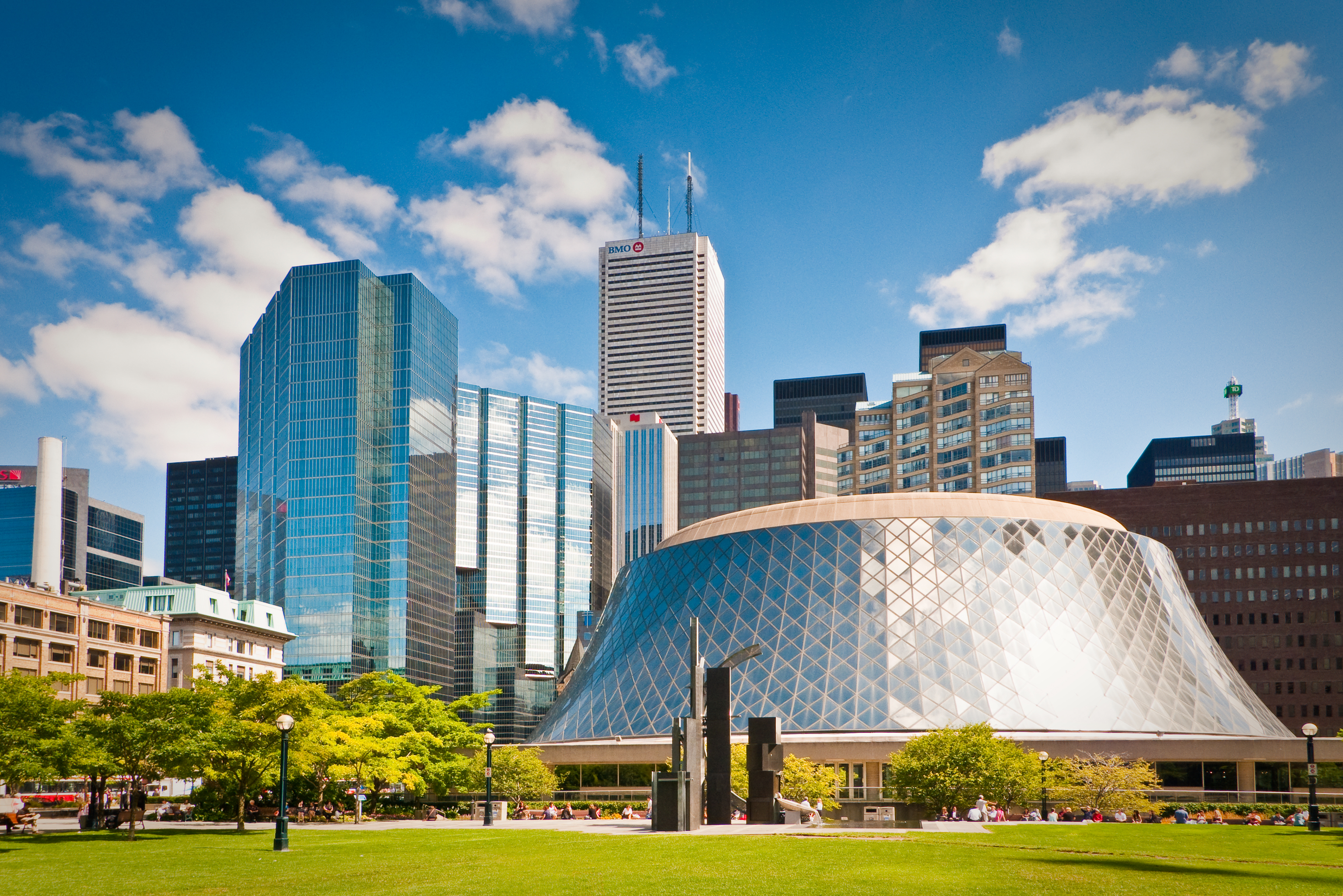
Roy Thomson Hall

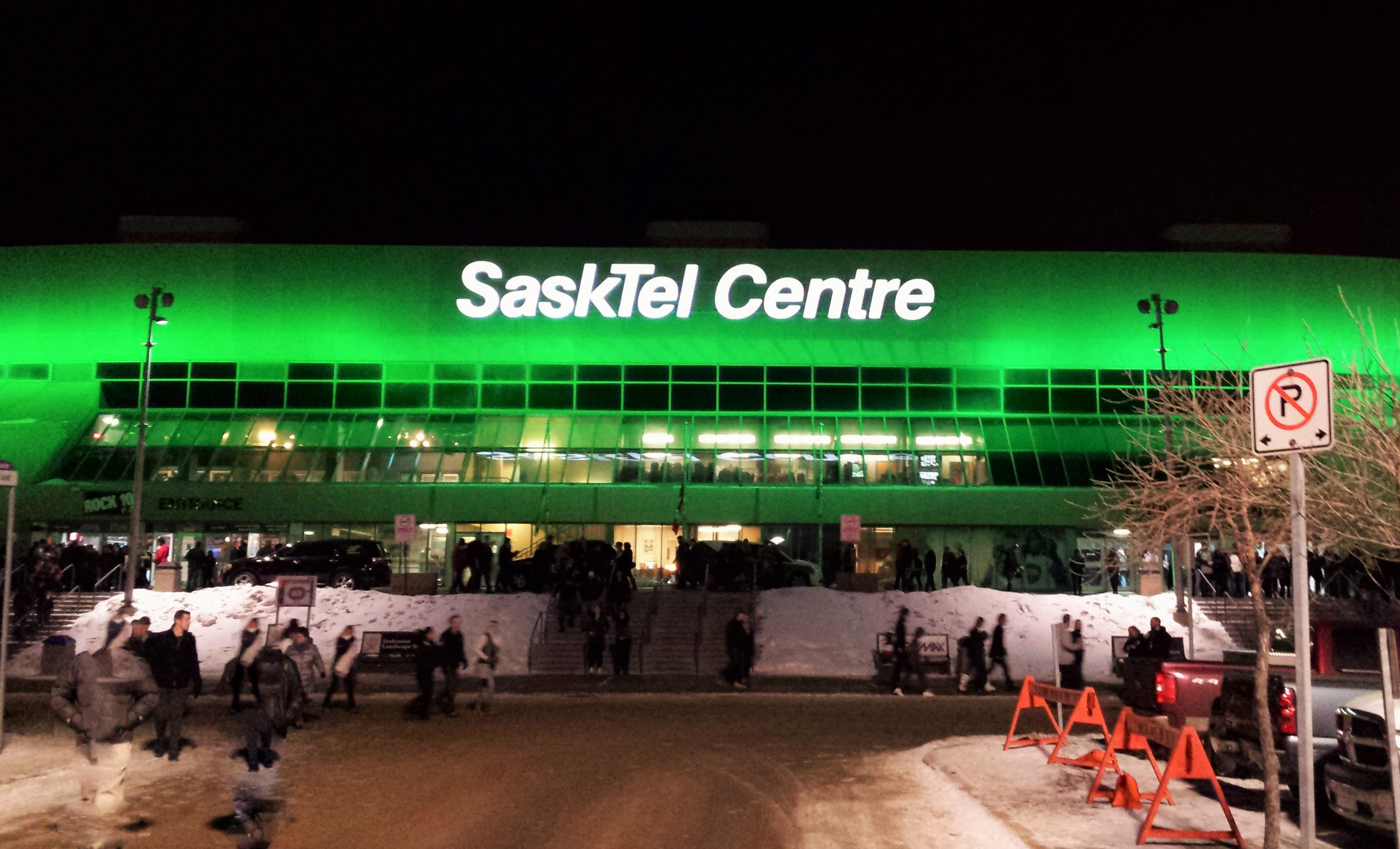
SaskTel Centre

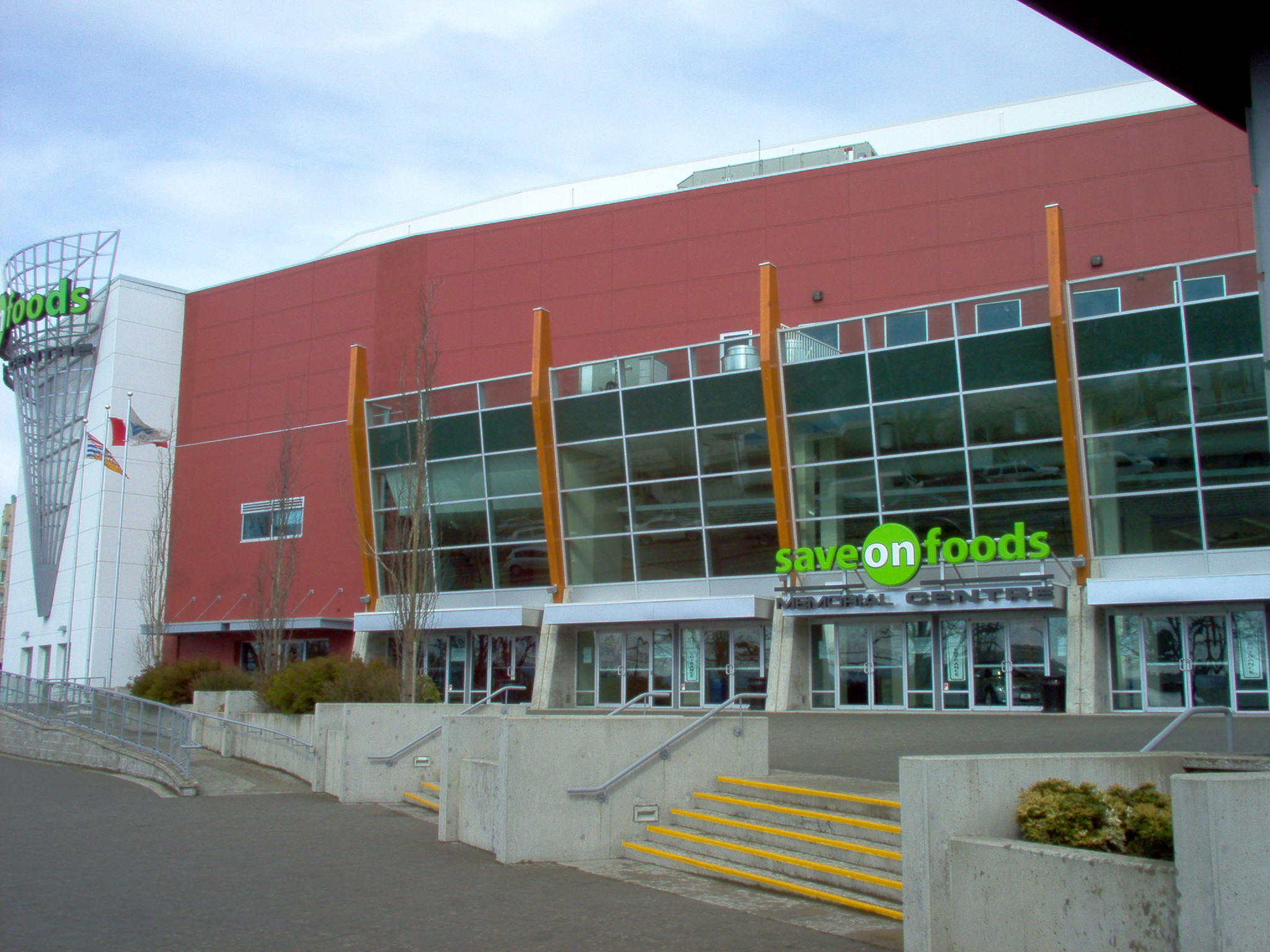
Save-on-Foods Memorial Centre

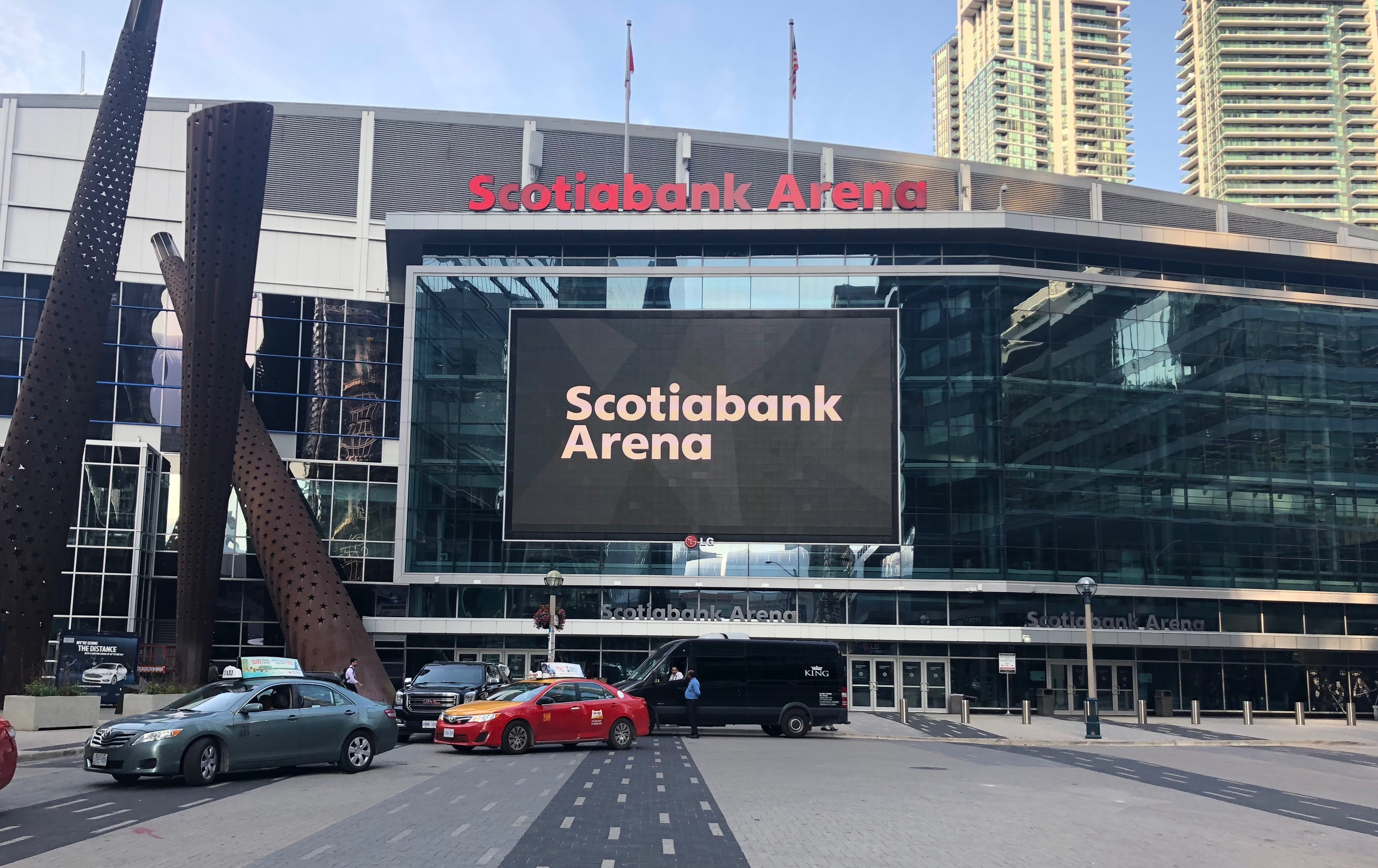
Scotiabank Arena

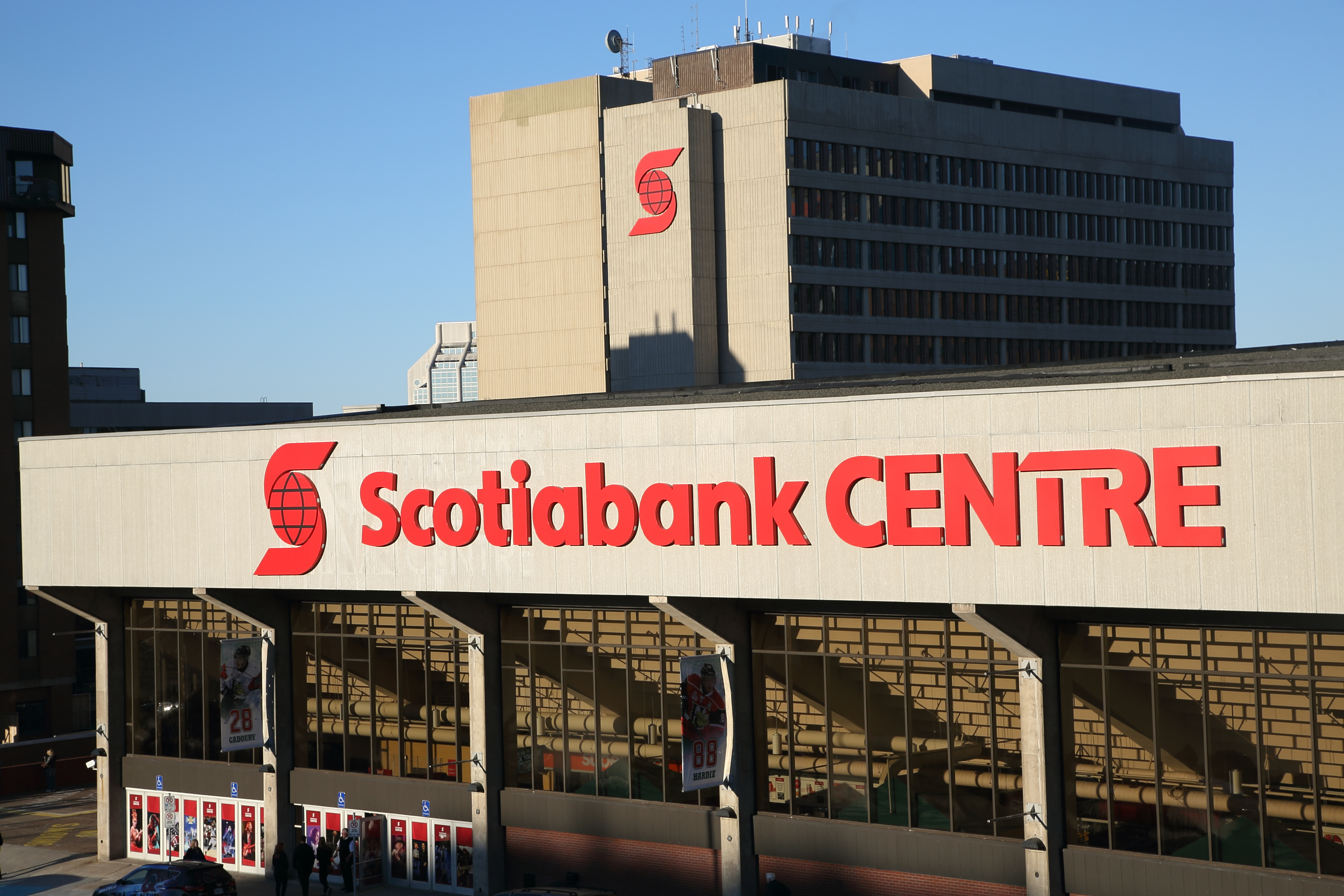
Scotiabank Centre

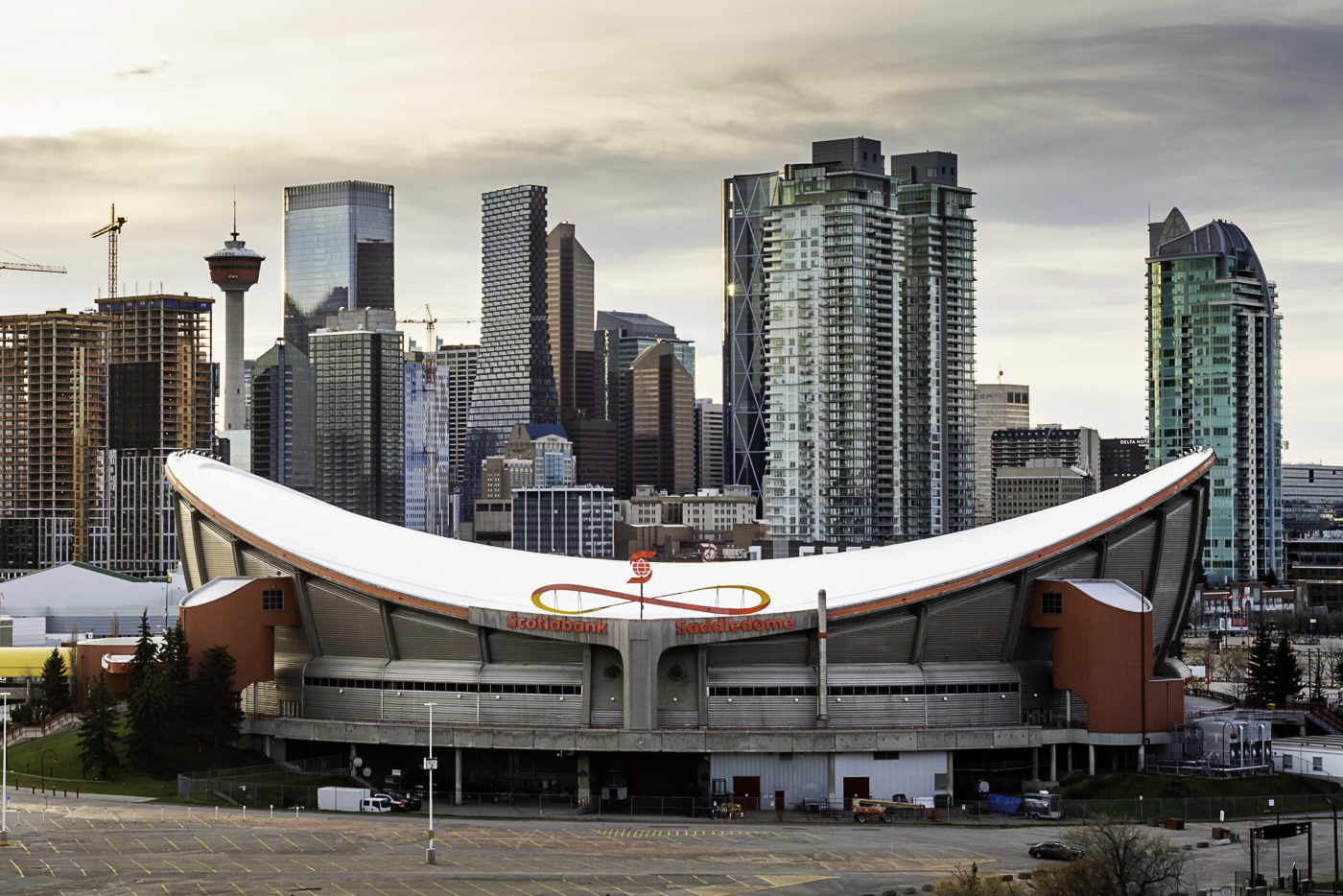
Scotiabank Saddledome

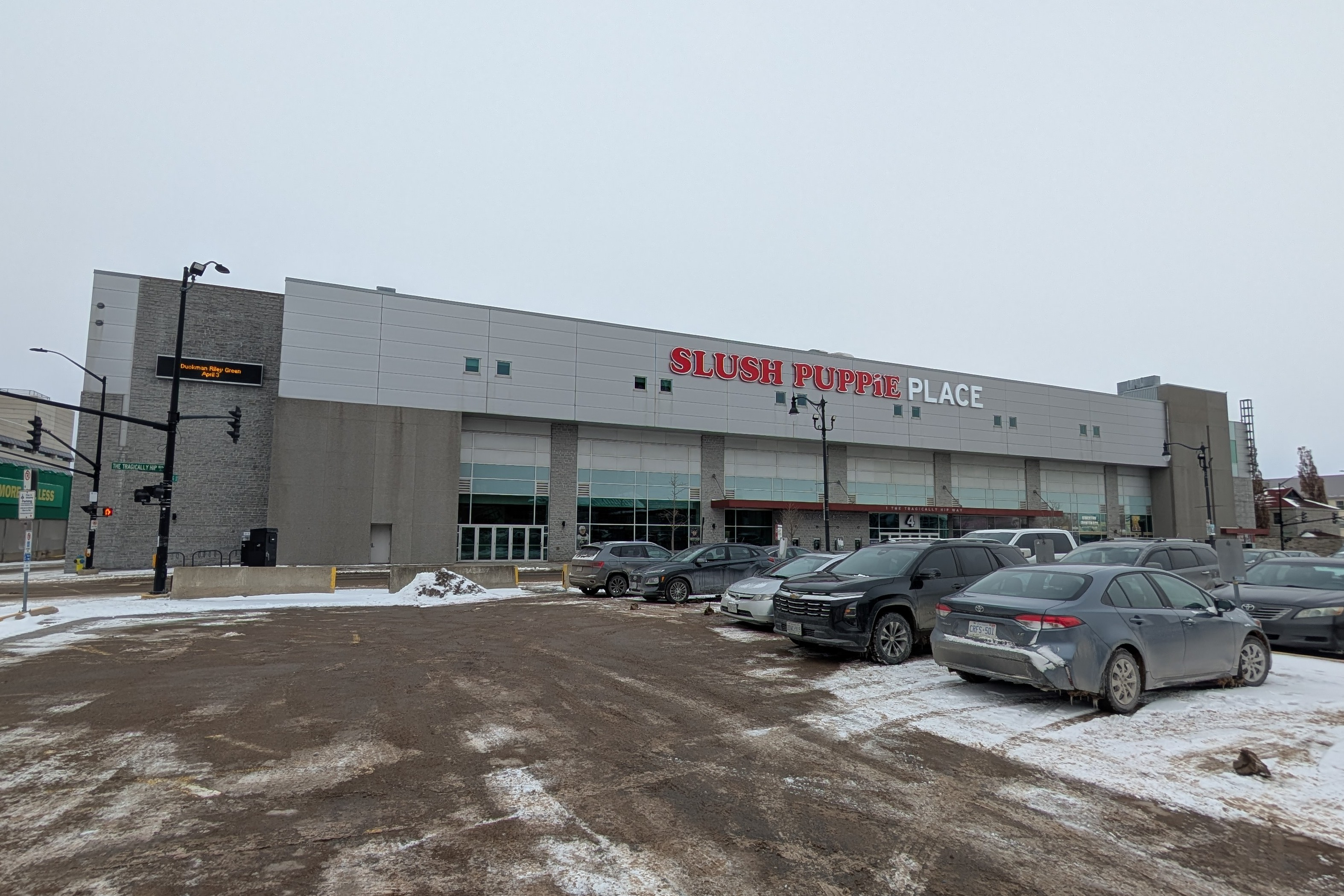
Slush Puppie Place

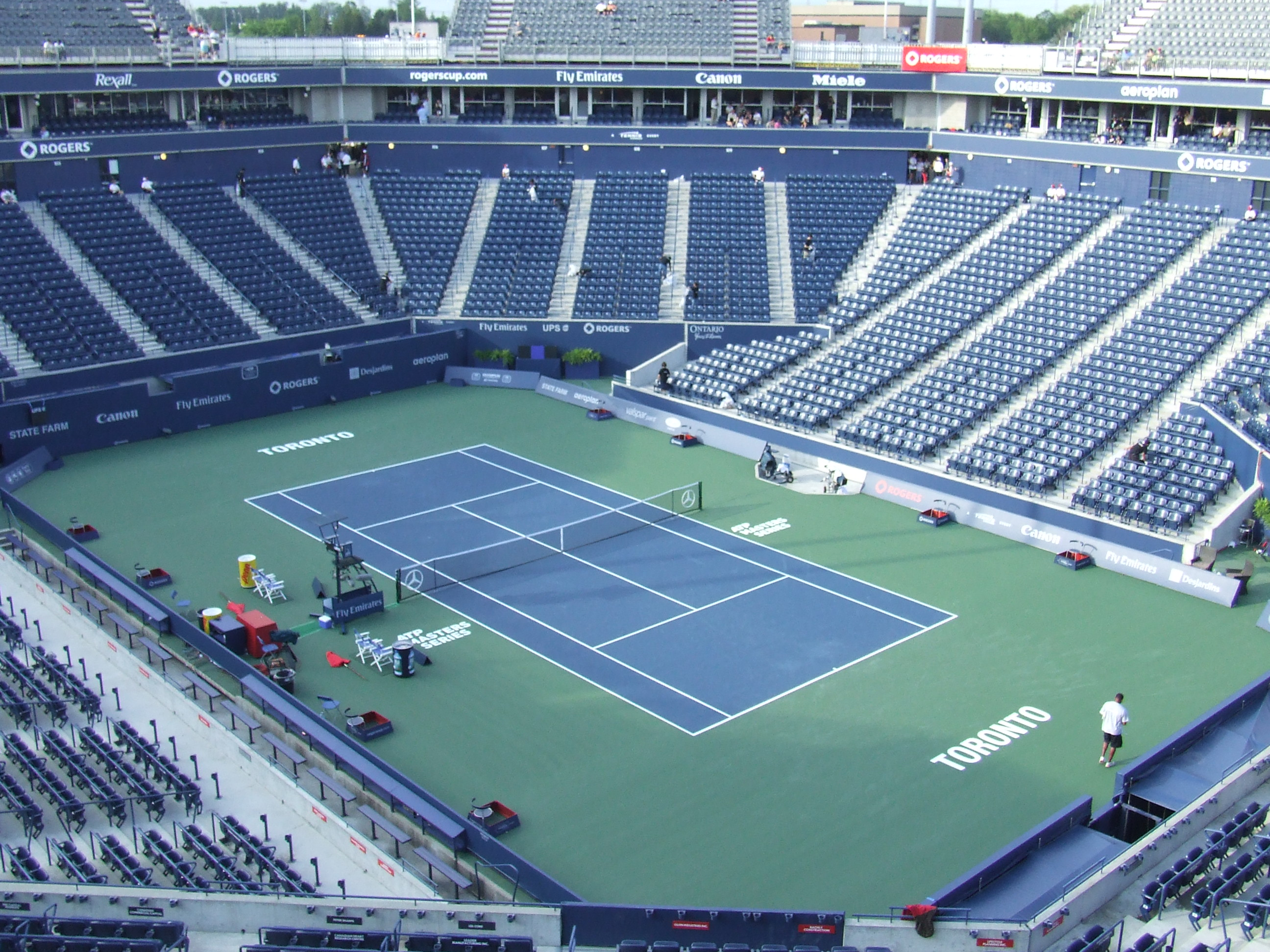
Sobeys Stadium

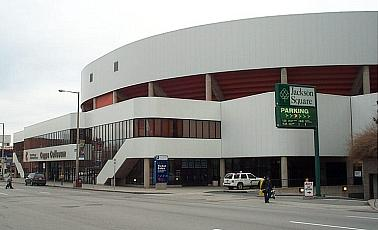
TD Coliseum

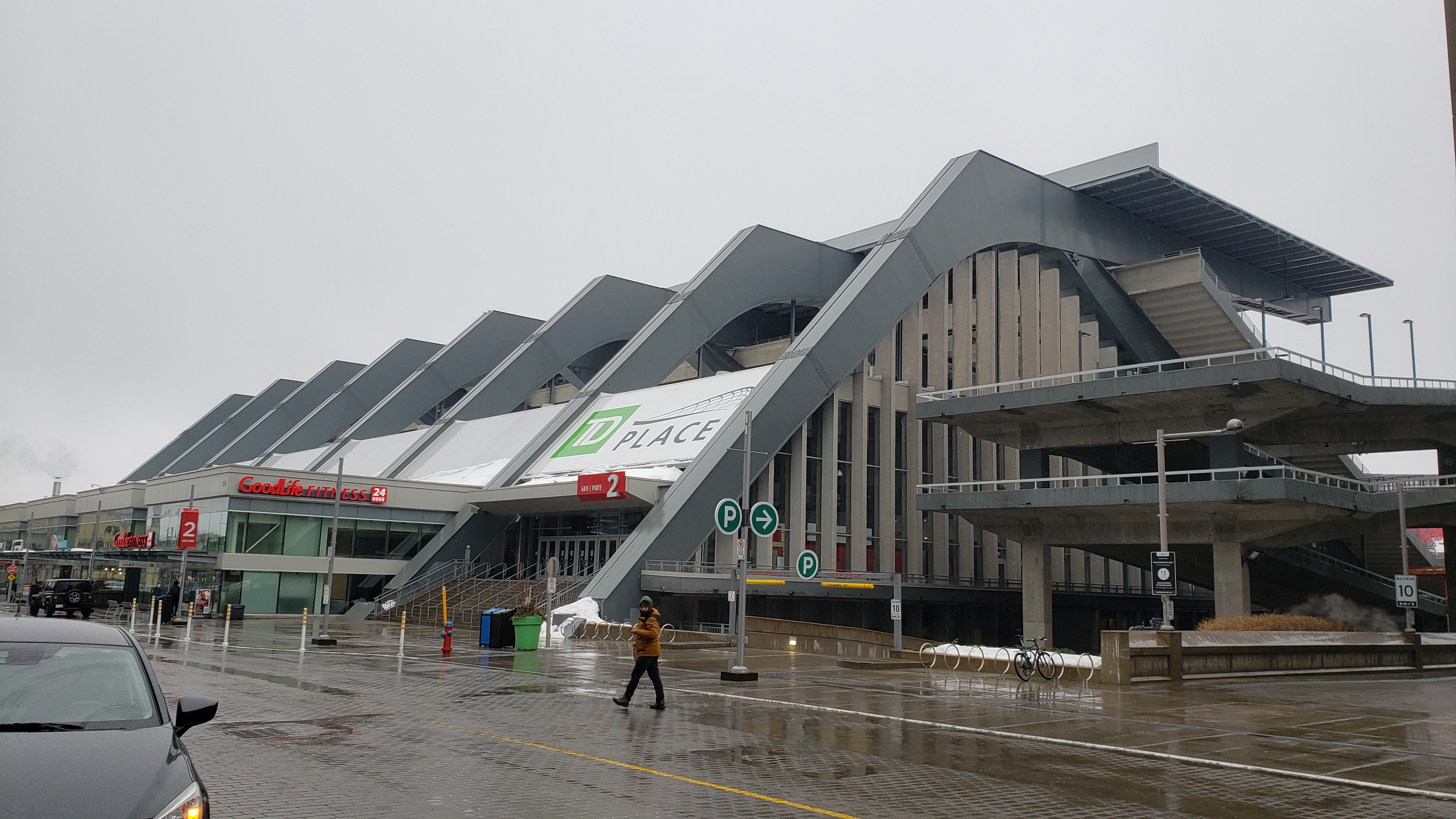
TD Place Stadium

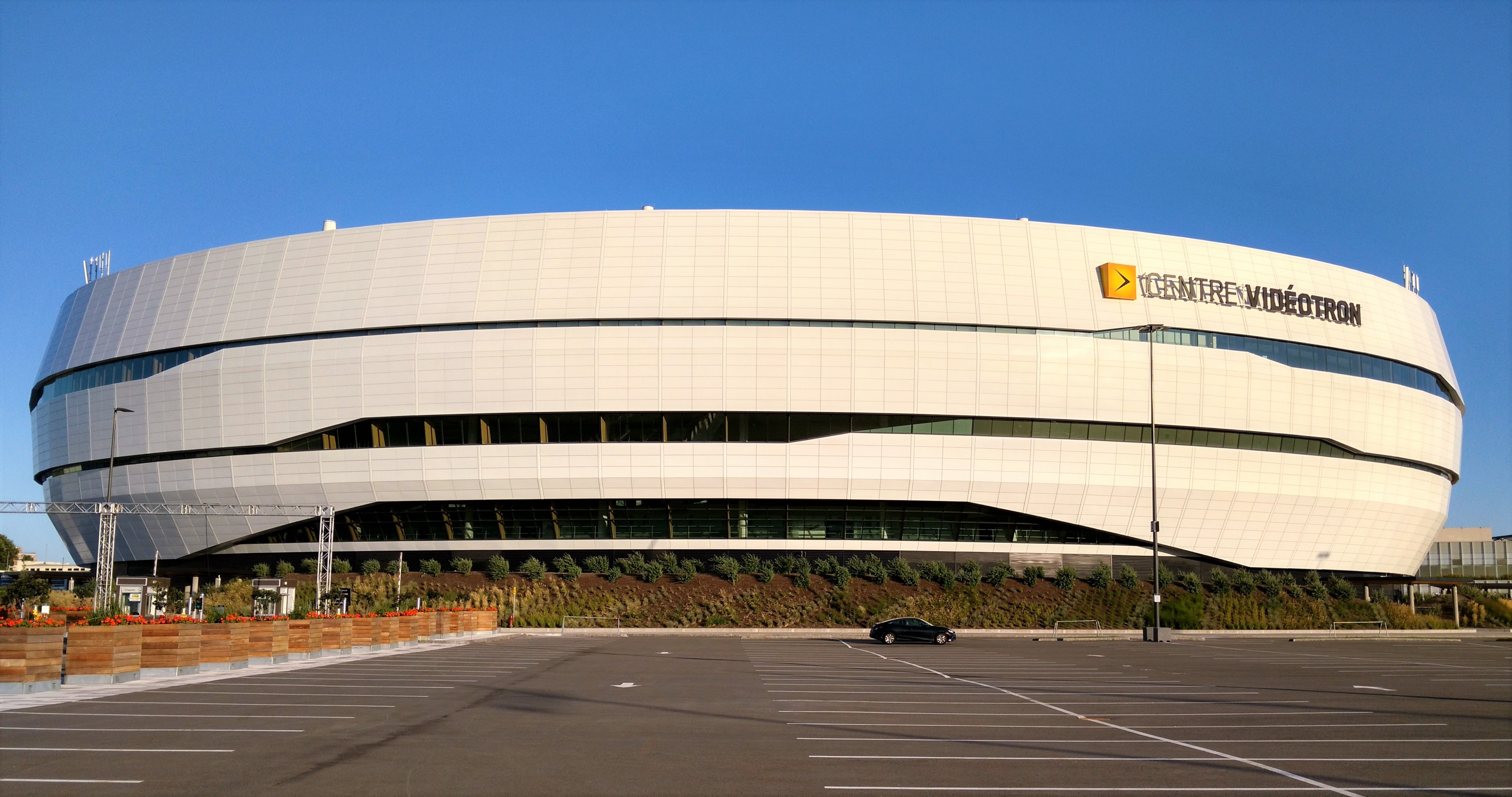
Videotron Centre
