= List of music venues in Toronto =

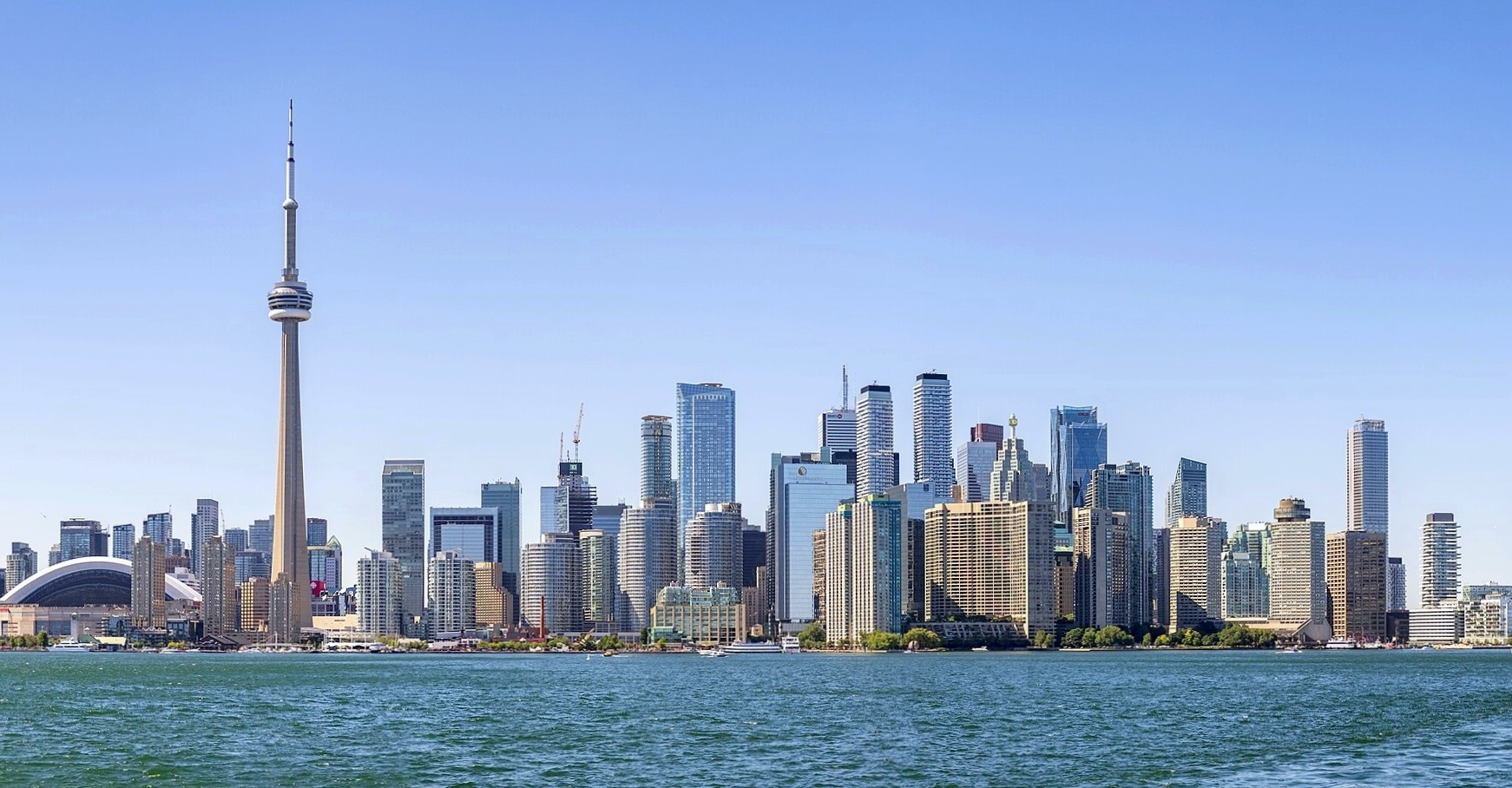
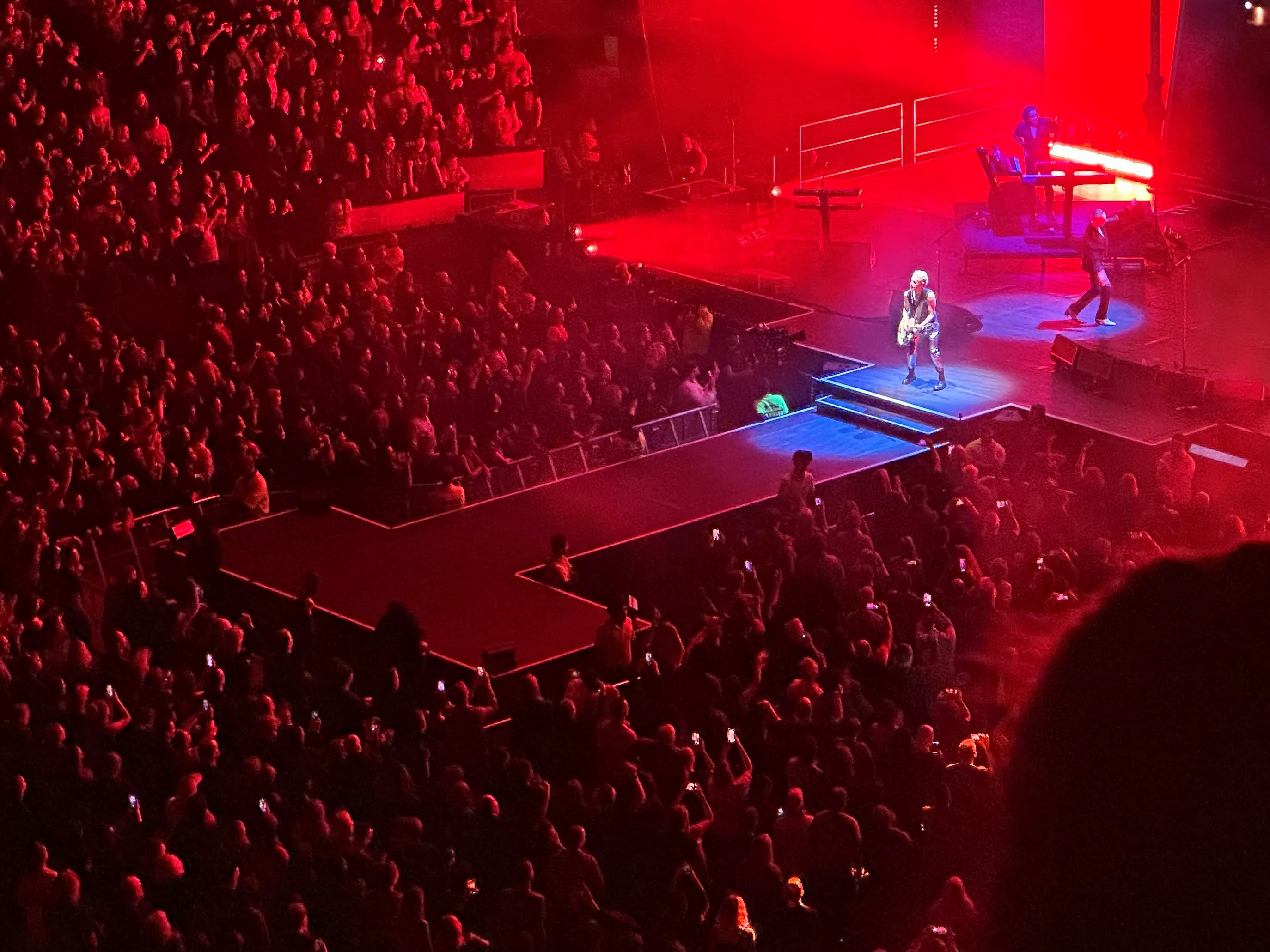
Toronto skyline, a 2023 concert held in Scotiabank Arena

The following is a list of currently operating music venues in the City of Toronto. Toronto is one of the most toured cities in the world, with 85% of large world tours passing through the city between 2015 and 2023. Rogers Centre and Scotiabank Arena are the highest capacity venues in the city, and they host most of the shows by superstar artists. Additionally, Toronto has the third largest concert market in the world, after New York and Los Angeles.

Live Nation Canada owns many of the large and mid sized venues in Toronto, including RBC Amphitheatre, History, The Opera House, The Danforth Music Hall, and Velvet Underground. This has been criticized by some as "monopolistic" and "big-footing". Supporters believe Live Nation is a benefit as it acquires venues that may otherwise go out of business, but critics say their practices push out independent venues and smaller promoters.

== Map ==
The following is an interactive map of Toronto's music venues with concert capacities greater than 1,000 people.

Arenas are denoted in red, while concert halls / theatres are denoted in green.

== Large venues ==
This section includes music venues with a capacity greater than 1,000 people. Defunct venues are not included.

Venue	Exterior image	Interior image	Max. capacity (Note: This value is rounded to the nearest hundreds and only shows the capacity of venues in concert configuration.)	Description	Year opened	Location
Rogers Stadium^{†}			50,000	Outdoor concert-specific venue	2025	Former Downsview Airport
Rogers Centre			40,000 – 50,000	Large indoor stadium that can be reconfigured for concerts. Previously known as the "SkyDome". Since its design didn't have live acoustics in mind, sound quality can vary. Accessible by a 10-minute-walk from Union Station.	1989	Entertainment District (1 Blue Jays Way)
Scotiabank Arena			19,800	Multi-use arena that hosts concerts. The venue describes itself as having a "state-of-the-art" BOSE sound system. In terms of ticket sales, Scotiabank Arena is the busiest concert venue in Canada, and thirteenth busiest in the world as of 2018. Accessible through the nearby Union Station.	1999	Entertainment District (40 Bay St)
RBC Amphitheatre^{†}			17,000	Located on one of Ontario Place's artificial islands, RBC Amphitheatre is primarily a concert venue. The venue consists of ringed sections. The innermost area is enclosed and seats 5,000; the outermost ring is a grassy hill without seats, where smoking is allowed. The sound quality is worsened in this section however, and improved in the inner seats. Due to the closure of Ontario Place, parking is ample.	1995	Ontario Place (909 Lake Shore Boulevard W)
CNE Bandshell^{†}			10,000	Entirely outdoor venue that hosts concerts part of the Canadian National Exhibition.	1936	Exhibition Place (60 Prince Edward Island Cr)
Coca-Cola Coliseum			4,100 – 9,200	A multi-use arena originally built for the Canadian National Exhibition. Can be accessed via Exhibition GO, as well, 5,000 parking spaces are available.	1921	Exhibition Place (45 Manitoba Drive)
Sobeys Stadium^{†}			9,100	Tennis arena located in the suburban York University campus. As of the early 2020s, it was underutilized for tennis, causing it to be pivoted more towards concerts. The venue can be accessed by the Pioneer Village subway station and has 7,000 parking spaces.	2004	York University (1 Shoreham Dr)
The Theatre at Great Canadian Toronto			5,000	Entertainment venue located in Great Canadian Casino Resort Toronto, which is the largest casino in Canada. The venue is run by Great Canadian Entertainment and located near Pearson airport and Highways 401 and 427.	2024	Etobicoke (1133 Queens Plate Dr)
RBC Echo Beach^{†}			4,000	Entirely outdoor venue which is also located in Ontario Place. Concertgoers stand on beach sand and there is no cover, unlike Budweiser Stage.	2011	Ontario Place (909 Lake Shore Boulevard W)
Meridian Hall			3,200	Opened as O'Keefe Centre, renamed several times including Hummingbird Centre and Sony Centre.	1960	Downtown Toronto (1 Front Street East)
Massey Hall			2,700	Historic performing arts theatre. The hall is designated a National Historic Site of Canada, and was specifically designed for high-quality acoustics, one reason why live albums are frequently recorded there.	1894	Downtown Toronto (178 Victoria Street)
Roy Thomson Hall			2,600	Concert hall that houses the Toronto Symphony Orchestra. It is known for its distinctive glass canopy design. The hall was renovated in the early 2000s following criticism about poor acoustics.	1982	Entertainment District (60 Simcoe St)
History			2,600	Drake-owned venue which is almost completely standing-room only. Food and alcohol are served by the bars surrounding the floor. There are also a small amount of box and theatre style seats available.	2021	The Beaches (1663 Queen Street E)
Rebel			2,500		2016	
Elgin Theatre			2,100		1913	
Four Seasons Centre			2,000			
Harbourfront Centre Concert Stage^{†}			2,000	Outdoor venue located on the waterfront. It hosts free shows and music festivals.	1992	Harbourfront (235 Queens Quay W.)
Convocation Hall			1,700			University of Toronto (31 King's College Circle)
Meridian Arts Centre			1,700		1993	North York (5040 Yonge St)
Danforth Music Hall			1,400	Originally built as a cinema theatre, the hall is designated as a heritage building. It can be accessed via Broadview station on the Bloor–Danforth line.	1919	Riverdale (147 Danforth Ave)
Winter Garden Theatre			1,410		1913	
Phoenix Concert Theatre			1,350			
Queen Elizabeth Theatre			1,250		1956	
The Concert Hall			1,200	Toronto’s renewed and reimagined premiere event space located centrally in beautiful Yorkville in the 100+ year old historic Masonic Temple.	1917	Yorkville (888 Yonge Street)
Koerner Hall			1,100	Concert hall part of The Royal Conservatory of Music's Telus Centre for Performance and Learning. Built for high-quality acoustics. Accessible via St. George station on Line 2 Bloor–Danforth.	2009	Yorkville (273 Bloor Street W)
The symbol "†" denotes an outdoor venue.

== Small venues ==
This section includes music venues with a capacity less than 1,000 people. Defunct venues are not included.

Venue	Capacity (Note: Rounded to nearest tens.)	Year built (Note: This is the year the building was constructed, but not necessarily when the venue became a music venue.)	Location	Ref.
The Opera House	800	1909	Riverside (735 Queen St E)	
The El Mocambo	650	1910	Kensington Market (464 Spadina Ave)	
Mod Club	620	2002	Little Italy (722 College St)	
Lee's Palace	550	1919	The Annex (529 Bloor St W)	
Adelaide Hall	550	2013	Downtown Toronto (250 Adelaide St W)	
The Great Hall	480	1889	Near Parkdale (1087 Queen St W)	
Horseshoe Tavern	400	1947	Downtown Toronto (370 Queen St W)	
The Royal Theatre	400	1939	Little Italy (608 College st)	
Lula Lounge	340	2002	Brockton Village (1585 Dundas St W)	
Ground Control	330	2023	Queen West (1279 Queen Street W)	
The Garrison	270	2009	Trinity-Bellwoods (1197 Dundas St W)	
The Rivoli	240	1982	Queen West (334 Queen Street W)	
Mazzoleni Concert Hall (Royal Conservatory of Music)	240	1901	Yorkville (273 Bloor Street W)	
The Redwood Theatre	240	1914	Leslieville (1300 Gerrard Street E)	
Hugh's Room	200	1894	East Chinatown (296 Broadview Ave)	
Sneaky Dee's	200	1987	Little Italy (431 College St)	
The Drake Hotel	200	1890	Near Parkdale (1150 Queen St W)	
918 Bathurst Centre (The Music Gallery)	200	1976	The Annex (918 Bathurst St)	
Bovine Sex Club	200	1991	Queen West (542 Queen St W)	
The Baby G	170	2016	Brockton Village (1608 Dundas St W)	
The Rex	150	1951	Downtown Toronto (194 Queen St W)	
The Monarch Tavern	120	1910	Little Italy (12 Clinton St)	
Grossman's Tavern	120	1884	Chinatown (377 Spadina Ave)	
Free Times Cafe	110	1980	Kensington Market (320 College St)	
DROM Taberna	75		Queen West (458 Queen St W)	
The Cameron House	70	1896	Queen West (408 Queen St W)	
