= Queen Elizabeth Theatre (Toronto) =

Theatre in Toronto, Ontario, Canada

Coordinates: 43.63271°N 79.42147°W

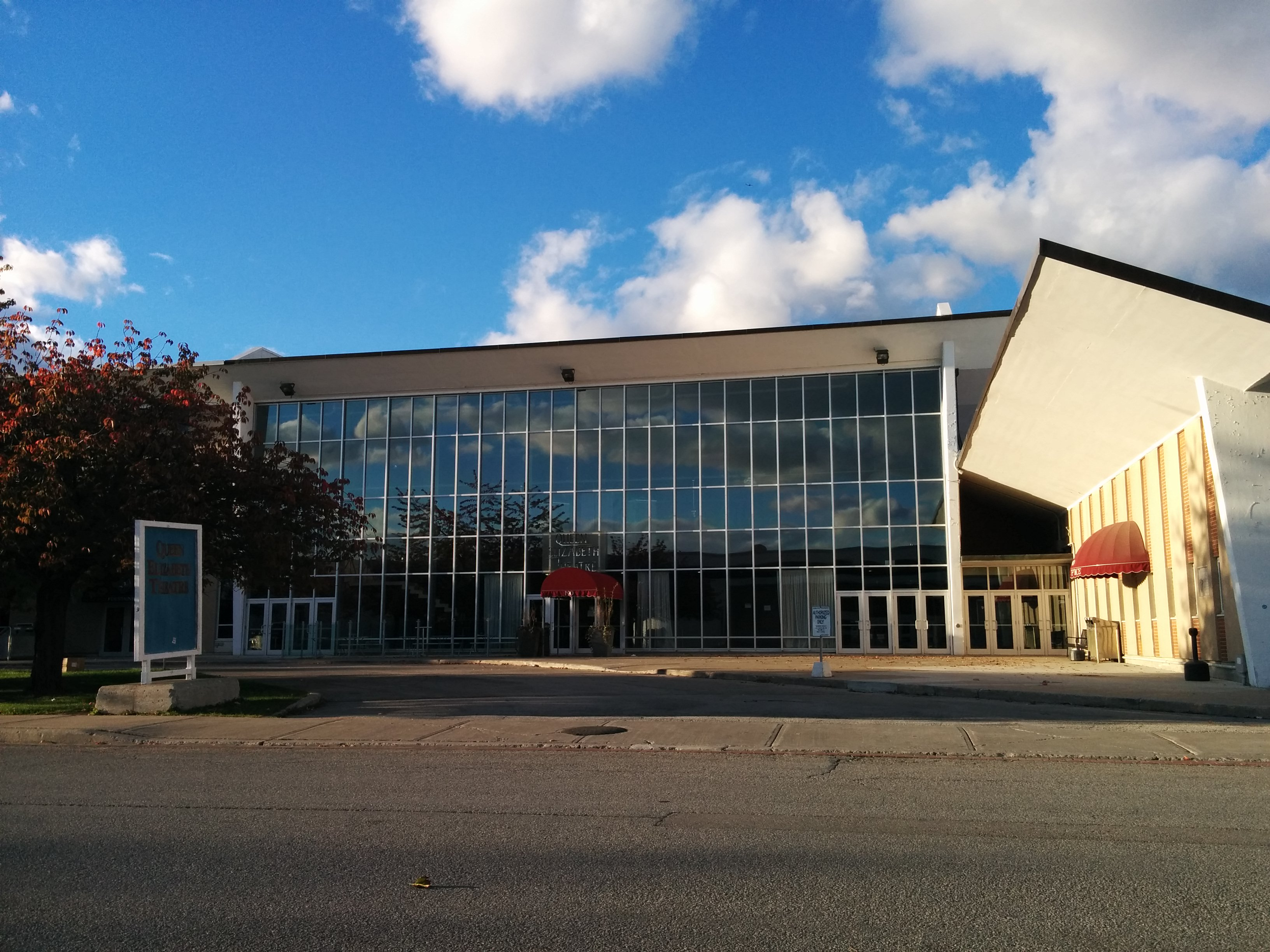
- View of Queen Elizabeth Theatre south facade
- Interactive map of Queen Elizabeth Theatre
- Location: Toronto, Ontario, Canada
- Owner: City of Toronto
- Operator: Bruno Sinopoli
- Capacity: 2,350
- Type: Theatre with stage, banquet facilities

Construction
- Built: 1956
- Renovated: 2010
- Architect: Peter Dickinson

Website
- Official website

Queen Elizabeth Theatre is an auditorium on the grounds of Exhibition Place in Toronto, Ontario, Canada. It opened in 1956 and was renovated circa 2010, now seating approximately 2,350 for concerts and other stage events. The building also houses the Fountainblu Banquet Centre, with 5,500 square feet of indoor meeting space.

Box offices for events are located at the entrance of the building. The theatre is situated in the Queen Elizabeth Building, which also houses administration offices and an exhibition hall.

One music reviewer describes the theatre in these terms: "From a listening standpoint, the Queen Elizabeth Theatre boasts near-perfect sound, but its stateliness makes it better suited to a lecture or a play than a rock show."

The owner of the building is the City of Toronto. Since 2006, it has been operated under a long-term lease by Bruno Sinopoli, the former owner and operator of the defunct Mod Club in Toronto.

== See also ==
- Royal eponyms in Canada
- List of music venues in Toronto
