= Midway (music hall) =

Nightclub concert venue located in Edmonton, Canada

- Location within Edmonton
- Location: 6107 104 St NW; Edmonton, Alberta; T6H 2K8
- Coordinates: 53.4984974°N 113.4965217°W
- Capacity: 1,450

Construction
- Opened: September 20, 2019

Website
- https://midwaymusichall.com/

Midway Music Hall is a live music and entertainment venue located in South Edmonton, Canada. As one of Edmonton’s largest venues, it serves as a cultural hub in the city. The venue has 20,000 square-feet of space including a 32-foot stage and in-house production capabilities.

== Background ==
The music and entertainment venue has a capacity of 1,450 people and is expected to play up to 150 events per year, featuring general admission, VIP and seating options. Construction began in June 2019 and its opening night was September 20, 2019, when the venue officially opened to the public.
