= History (venue) =

Concert venue located in Ontario, Canada

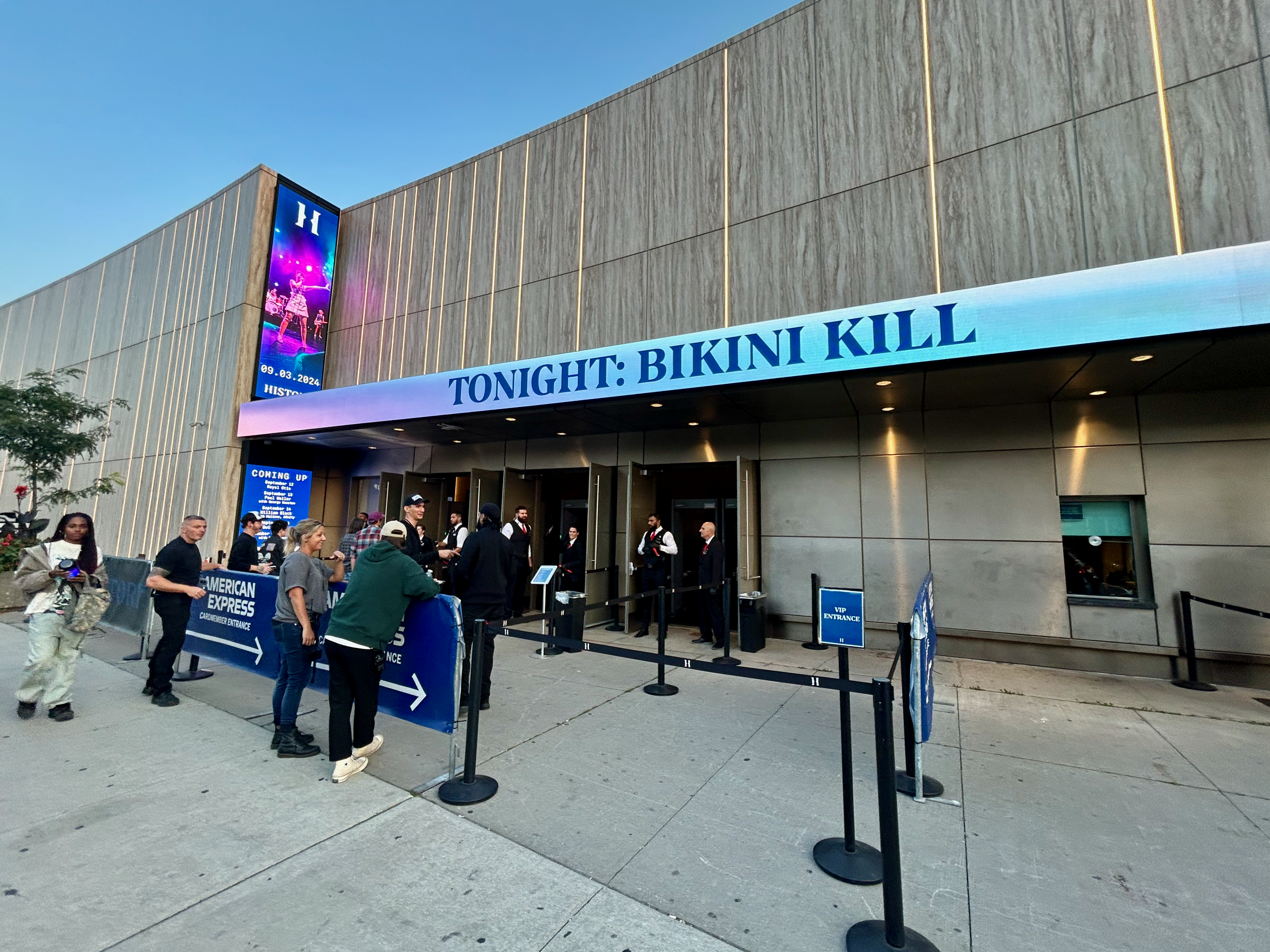
- History Toronto in September 2024.

- Location within Ontario
- Location: Toronto, Ontario; Ottawa, Ontario
- Coordinates: 43.66°N 79.31°W; 45.42°N 75.69°W
- Capacity: 2,500 (Toronto); 2,000 (Ottawa)

Construction
- Opened: November 7, 2021 (Toronto); August 19, 2026 (Ottawa)

Website
- https://www.historytoronto.com/ https://www.historyottawa.com/

History are music venues in Toronto and Ottawa, Ontario, Canada. The venues hosts various events such as concerts, live entertainment, galas and community programs and events.

== History Toronto ==
The building is located at 1663 Queen Street East. It was previously known as Greenwood Teletheatre and was used for off-track betting.

The venue was announced in June 2021 when both American company Live Nation Entertainment and Canadian musician Drake collaborated to open the venue later in the year. It has a capacity of 2,500 people and is expected to play up to 200 events per year, featuring general admission and seating options.

The venue was set to open in October 2021, but was postponed to November 7, 2021, when the venue officially opened to the public. The inaugural concert on its opening day was performed by Bleachers.

== History Ottawa ==
The building is located at 47 Rideau Street, in Downtown Ottawa. It was originally constructed in 1950 for the F.W. Woolworth Co. department store before later housing a Chapters bookstore. The venue was under development by the National Capital Commission (NCC) and Live Nation Canada since 2024.

The venue opened in August 2026, with a surprise show by Canadian group Dwayne Gretzky. The inaugural concert was the following night by the American rock band The Wallflowers. History Ottawa features a 2,000 seating capacity with a larger stage and taller ceilings than the other location. Drake is a partner in both the Ottawa and Toronto locations.

== See also ==
- List of music venues in Toronto
