= Phoenix Concert Theatre =

Canadian concert venue

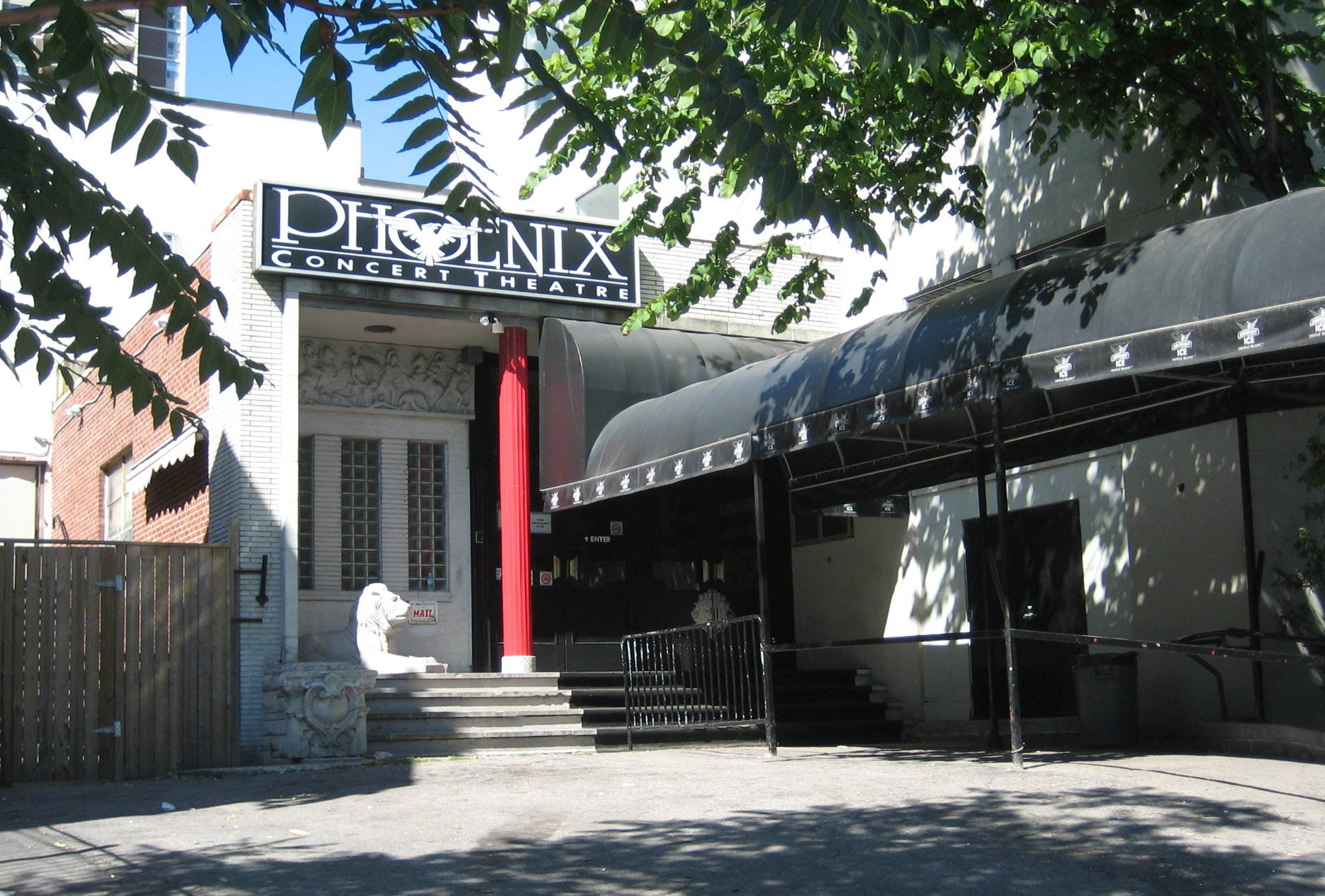
- Entrance to the Phoenix.
- Interactive map of Phoenix Concert Theatre
- Former names: The Diamond (1984–1991)
- Location: 410 Sherbourne Street; Toronto, Ontario; M5X 1K2
- Coordinates: 43.66461°N 79.374118°W
- Owner: Lisa Zbitnew
- Capacity: 1,350
- Type: Music Venue
- Event: Alternative rock

Construction
- Opened: 1991

Website
- Phoenix Concert Theatre

The Phoenix Concert Theatre is a concert venue located at 410 Sherbourne Street in Toronto, Ontario, Canada.

== Description ==
It is 18,000 sq ft (1,700 m^{2}) large and encompasses three distinct environments. The "Main Room" features one of the city's largest dance floors, leading edge sound and light, five bars (including a 50-foot (15 m) marble bar), 20x30 foot stage, a giant projection screen and one of the largest mirror balls in Canada.

"Le Loft" overlooks the main room, features an overhanging balcony which stretches the entire width of the club, lounge seating for over 100, and its own separate bar, custom artwork, and two television screens. The "Parlour" is reachable from the main room and the front entrance, features a separate sound system, a separate dance floor and lighting system, a decorative bar, lounge seating and four pool tables.

== History ==
=== Harmonie ===
The building originally served as the German-Canadian Club Harmonie, a rental venue for community gatherings, oom-pah bands, and ballroom dancing. During its operation, it had three restaurants and a bowling alley among its functions. Among its events, it hosted boxing matches, fencing competitions and stamp exhibits.

Harmonie ran into financial trouble in the 1970s. It had a CA$750,000 debt and rented out the facility for dinner theatre Talk of Toronto Dinner Theatre in 1980.

By the early 1980s, the venue caught the eye of veteran New York City-based hospitality entrepreneur Pat Kenny a.k.a. "The Bard of Bleecker Street" who at the time had a stake in three well known Manhattan nightclubs — The Bitter End and Kenny's Castaways in Greenwich Village as well as the Cat Club, considered by some to be the epicentre of the 1980s NYC glam metal scene. After being alerted to Toronto's Club Harmonie by friends at the Village Gate, New York City venue that doubled as nightclub and dinner theatre, Kenny opened an offshoot location of the Village Gate in Toronto with Club Harmonie still holding court in a small space within the building. After a few unsuccessful productions, the dinner theatre folded, and Kenny began renting the entire building to open a music venue.

=== The Diamond ===
In April 1984, The Diamond Club took over the premises. Initially open Thursdays through Saturdays, and modelled on the Cat Club, it was overseen day-to-day by Randy Charlton whom Kenny got to run the newly launched club, hiring Charlton away from Sparkles discothèque at the top of the CN Tower having originally gone to Sparkles with the intent of luring its weekend resident DJ, Paul Cohen, over to the Diamond. Simultaneously, a staff of some fifty individuals had also been hired to work under the Diamond's general manager Charlton, developing and maintaining a theatrical, versatile venue with high-quality sound and lighting. Reflecting the ambiance of Kenny's New York clubs, the Diamond's interior stood out on Toronto's nightclub scene, differing significantly from the standard brass-and-mirrors decor of numerous clubs in the city at the time.

During its first year of operation, the Diamond functioned just as a dance club with concerts held only occasionally. Food was served in a restaurant located at the back of the club, in a room that became known as The Grapevine.

Under Kenny's ownership, the theatre was reconfigured to increase its capacity from 500 to 1,350, its legal limit.

=== Phoenix Concert Theatre ===
The Diamond folded in January 1991, replaced by the Phoenix. In 2014, Sound Academy owners Lisa Zbitnew, Zeke Myers and Rebel nightclub partner Tony Grossi took over.

On October 25, 2024, co-owner and operator Lisa Zbitnew announced that the venue planned to secure a new location, but would continue to operate on Sherbourne Street until 2026. This followed an earlier announcement that the venue would close on January 15, 2025. The venue is set to relocate to Parkdale Hall on the west side of Toronto in late 2027, but will remain operational until rezoning and construction is approved.

== Artists who played at The Diamond (1984–1991) ==
- 54-40
- Alannah Myles
- B.B. King
- The Band
- Blue Rodeo
- Bourbon Tabernacle Choir
- Camper Van Beethoven
- The Fabulous Thunderbirds
- Gowan
- Happy Mondays
- Hothouse Flowers
- Jane's Addiction
- Joe Jackson
- John Lee Hooker
- Kris Kristofferson
- Lee Aaron
- Lenny Kravitz
- Pantera
- Primus
- Red Hot Chili Peppers
- Robyn Hitchcock
- Run-DMC
- Sarah McLachlan
- Sinéad O'Connor
- Skinny Puppy
- Sonic Youth
- Spoons
- They Might Be Giants
- Tracy Chapman
- Warren Zevon
- World Party

== Artists who have played the Phoenix Concert Theatre (1991–present) ==
- Alanis Morissette
- Bajaga i Instruktori
- Barenaked Ladies
- Billie Eilish
- Black Midi
- Blur
- Bob Dylan
- The Boredoms
- Brian Jonestown Massacre
- Butthole Surfers
- Constantines
- David Usher
- Deerhoof
- Deerhunter
- Dinosaur Jr
- Econoline Crush
- Einstürzende Neubauten
- Elliott Smith
- Epica
- Fantômas
- Fontaines D.C.
- Foo Fighters
- Fugazi
- Godspeed You! Black Emperor
- Green Day
- Hole
- The Jesus and Mary Chain
- Kamelot
- Kiss
- The Living Tombstone
- The Lemonheads
- Metallica
- Mogwai
- Moist
- Molchat Doma
- Moxy Früvous
- Nele Karajlić
- The New Pornographers
- New York Dolls
- Nightwish
- Oasis
- Patti Smith
- PJ Harvey
- Pavement
- Primal Scream
- Pulp
- Queensrÿche
- Rage Against the Machine
- The Rolling Stones
- The Roots
- Rush
- Rusty
- Sabaton
- Sabrina Carpenter
- Sloan
- Squid
- The Smashing Pumpkins
- The Streets
- Swans
- Teenage Fanclub
- Tori Amos
- The Tragically Hip
- Urge Overkill
- Uriah Heep
- The Verve
- The Watchmen
- The Weakerthans
- Weezer
- Ween
- White Zombie
- Yo La Tengo
- OsamaSon
- Nettspend

== See also ==
- List of music venues in Toronto
