= List of casinos in Canada =

This is an incomplete list of casinos in Canada as of around 2011:

Type:
Resort (R)
Destination (D)
Community (C)
Racing entertainment centre (REC)

Ownership:
Government owned (GO)
First Nations (FN)
Private facility (PF)
Privately operated (PO)
Charitable (C)
Not-for-profit (NFP)

Facilities:
Slots (S)
Slots-At-Racetracks (SAR)
Racino (R)
Video lottery terminal (V)

				Type				Ownership						Facilities			
Name	Region/city	Prov.	Est.	R	D	C	REC	GO	FN	PF	PO	C	NFP	S	SAR	R	V
Lake City Casino Penticton	Penticton	BC	2000		check												
Starlight Casino	New Westminster	BC	2007		check												
St. Eugene Golf Resort & Casino	Cranbrook	BC	2002		check				check								
Billy Barker Casino Hotel	Quesnel	BC	1987			check											
Cascades Casino	Langley	BC	2005			check											
Parq Vancouver	Vancouver	BC	2017			check											
Grand Villa Casino	Burnaby	BC	2008			check											
Hard Rock Casino Vancouver	Coquitlam	BC	2001			check											
Great Canadian Casino Nanaimo	Nanaimo	BC	1998			check											
Great Canadian Casino View Royal	Victoria	BC	2001			check											
Lake City Casino	Kamloops	BC	1992			check											
Lake City Casino	Kelowna	BC	1992			check											
Lake City Casino	Vernon	BC	1992			check											
River Rock Casino Resort	Richmond	BC	2004			check											
Treasure Cove Casino & Hotel	Prince George	BC	1986			check											
Fraser Downs Racetrack Casino	Surrey	BC	2004			check								check		check	
Hastings Park Racecourse	Vancouver	BC	2007			check								check		check	
Great Northern Casino	Grande Prairie	AB	1999									check					
Boomtown Casino	Fort McMurray	AB	1994									check					
Casino Dene	Cold Lake	AB	2007						check								
Pure Casino Yellowhead	Edmonton	AB	2000							check		check					
Grand Villa Casino Edmonton	Edmonton	AB	2016							check		check					
River Cree Resort And Casino	Enoch	AB	2006						check								
Pure Casino Edmonton	Edmonton	AB	1986							check		check					
Baccarat Casino	Edmonton	AB	1996							check		check					
Century Casino & Hotel Edmonton	Edmonton	AB	2006							check		check					
Century Casino St. Albert	St. Albert	AB	2016							check		check					
Camrose Resort Casino	Camrose	AB	2007							check		check					
Jackpot Casino	Red Deer	AB	1997							check		check					
Cash Casino	Red Deer	AB	1995							check		check					
Eagle River Casino & Travel Plaza	Whitecourt	AB	2008						check								
Elbow River Casino	Calgary	AB	1989							check		check					
Deerfoot Inn & Casino	Calgary	AB	2005							check		check					
Pure Casino Calgary	Calgary	AB	1997							check		check					
ACE Casino Blackfoot	Calgary	AB	1980							check		check					
ACE Casino Airport	Calgary	AB	1996							check		check					
Cowboys Casino	Calgary	AB	1988							check		check					
Grey Eagle Casino	Tsuu T'ina	AB	2007						check								
Stoney Nakoda Resort Casino	Kananaskis	AB	2008						check								
Pure Casino Lethbridge	Lethbridge	AB	1993							check		check					
Casino By Vanshaw	Medicine Hat	AB	1996							check		check					
Evergreen Park Casino	Grande Prairie	AB	2003				check							check			
Whoop-Up Downs	Lethbridge	AB	1997				check							check			
Casino Regina	Regina	SK	1996					check									
Casino Moose Jaw	Moose Jaw	SK	2002					check									
Dakota Dunes Casino	Whitecap	SK	2007						check								
Gold Eagle Casino	North Battleford	SK	1996						check								
Gold Horse Casino	Lloydminster	SK	2018						check								
Northern Lights Casino	Prince Albert	SK	1996						check								
Bear Claw Casino & Hotel	Carlyle	SK	1996						check								
Painted Hand Casino	Yorkton	SK	1996						check								
Living Sky Casino	Swift Current	SK	2008						check								
Crystal Casino	Winnipeg	MB	1989 - May 22, 1997														
McPhillips Station Casino	Winnipeg	MB	1993					check									
Club Regent Casino	Winnipeg	MB	1993					check									
South Beach Casino	Grand Beach	MB	2005						check								
Aseneskak Casino	The Pas	MB	2002						check								
Assiniboia Downs Club West Gaming Lounge	Winnipeg	MB	1992													check	check
Casino Windsor	Windsor	ON	1994	check				check			check						
Caesars Windsor	Windsor	ON	1998														
Casino Niagara	Niagara Falls	ON	1996	check				check			check						
Georgian Downs	Innisfil	ON	2001												check		
Pickering Casino Resort	Pickering	ON	2021								check			check			
Playtime Casino Wasaga	Wasaga Beach	ON	2022								check			check			
Niagara Fallsview Casino Resort	Niagara Falls	ON	2004	check				check			check						
Casino Rama	Rama	ON	1996	check				check	check		check						
Elements Casino Brantford*	Brantford	ON	1999									check					
OLG Casino Sault Ste. Marie*	Sault Ste. Marie	ON	1999									check					
OLG Casino Thunder Bay*	Thunder Bay	ON	2000									check					
OLG Casino Point Edward*	Point Edward	ON	2000									check					
Shorelines Casino Thousand Islands*	Gananoque	ON	2002									check					
Golden Eagle Charitable Casino & Gaming Centre	Kenora	ON	1994						check								
Great Blue Heron Casino	Port Perry	ON	1997						check								
Casino Ajax Downs*	Ajax	ON	2006												check		
OLG Slots at Clinton Raceway*	Clinton	ON	2000												check		
OLG Slots at Dresden Raceway*	Dresden	ON	2001												check		
OLG Slots at Flamboro Downs*	Dundas	ON	2000												check		
OLG Slots at Fort Erie Racetrack*	Fort Erie	ON	1999												check		
OLG Slots at Grand River Raceway*	Elora	ON	2003												check		
OLG Slots at Hanover Raceway*	Hanover	ON	2001												check		
OLG Slots at Hiawatha Horse Park*	Sarnia	ON	1999												check		
Shorelines Slots at Kawartha Downs*	Fraserville	ON	1999												check		
Shorelines Casino Peterborough*	Peterborough	ON	2018												check		
OLG Slots at Mohawk Racetrack*	Campbellville	ON	1999												check		
OLG Slots at Rideau Carleton Raceway*	Gloucester	ON	2000												check		
OLG Slots at Sudbury Downs*	Chelmsford	ON	1999												check		
Gateway Casinos London*	London	ON	1999												check		
OLG Slots at Woodbine Racetrack*	Toronto	ON	2000												check		
OLG Slots at Woodstock Raceway*	Woodstock	ON	2001												check		
Casino de Montréal	Montreal	QC	1993					check						check			
Casino de Charlevoix	La Malbaie	QC	1994					check						check			
Casino du Lac-Leamy	Gatineau	QC	1996					check									
Casino du Mont-Tremblant	Mont-Tremblant	QC	2009					check									
Hippodrome d'Aylmer	Aylmer	QC	2008													check	check
Hippodrome de Montréal	Montreal	QC	2008													check	check
Hippodrome De Québec	Quebec City	QC	2008													check	check
Ludoplex Trois-Rivières	Trois-Rivières	QC	2008														
Ludoplex Québec	Quebec City	QC	2008														
Playground Poker Club	Kahnawake	QC	2010											check			
Casino New Brunswick	Moncton	NB	2010					check			check						
CC's Entertainment Center	Elsipogtog	NB	2015														
Grey Rock Casino	Edmundston	NB	2015														
Red Shores Racetrack and Casino	Charlottetown	PE	2005											check		check	
Casino Nova Scotia	Halifax	NS	1995					check			check						
Casino Nova Scotia	Sydney	NS	1995					check			check						
Diamond Tooth Gertie's Gambling Hall	Dawson City	YT	1972										check				

*OLG = Ontario Lottery and Gaming Corporation

== See also ==
- List of casinos and horse racing tracks in Alberta
- List of casinos in the United States
- Société des casinos du Québec
