= Cityplace (Winnipeg) =

Office and retail complex in Winnipeg

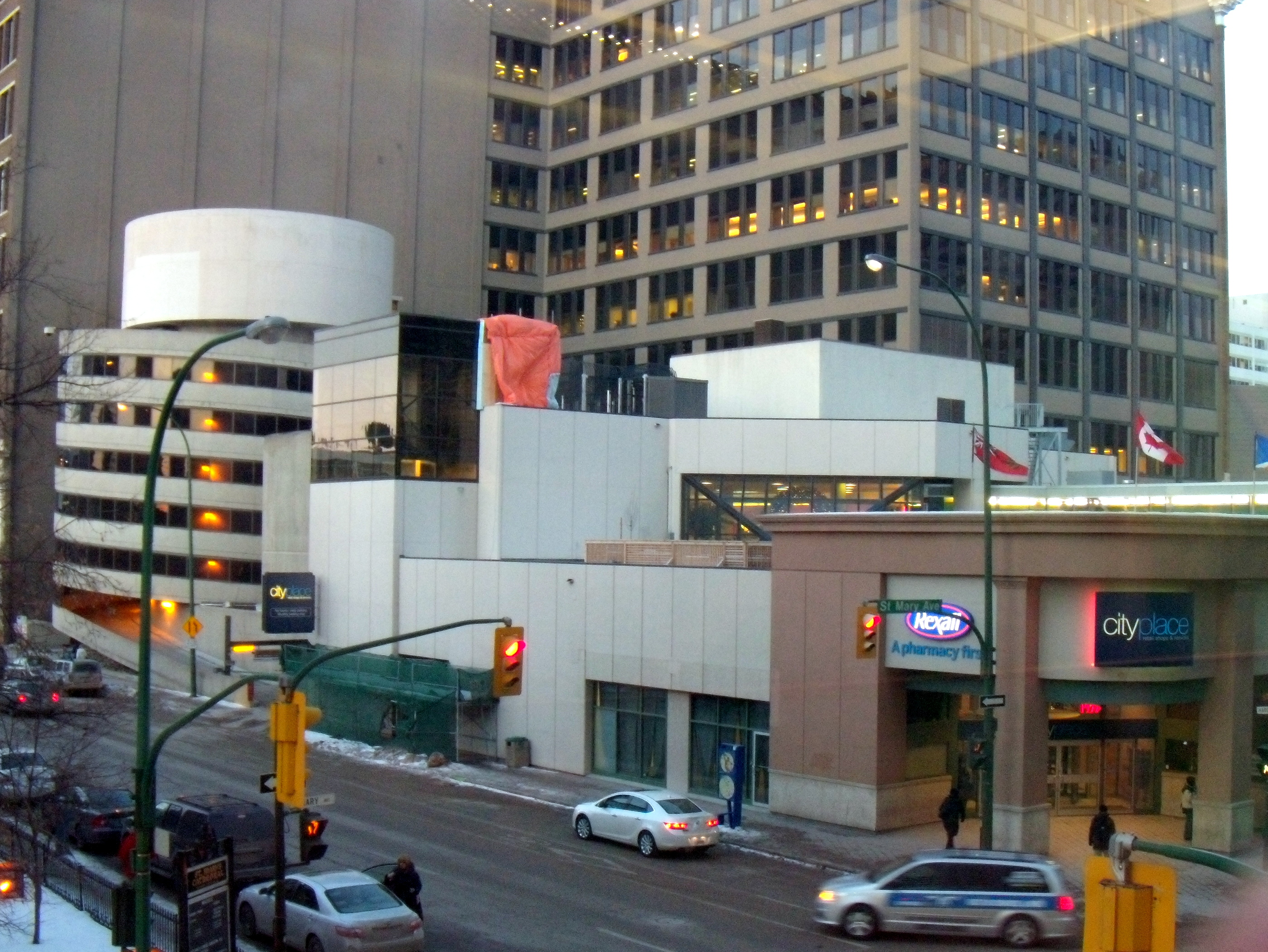
- Cityplace in Downtown Winnipeg
- Coordinates: 49.8913°N 97.1423°W
- Address: 333 St. Mary Avenue; Winnipeg, Manitoba; R3C 4A5
- Opened: October 11, 1979; 47 years ago
- Manager: McCor Management
- Owner: Manitoba Public Insurance
- Architect: John Woodman
- Num. of stores: 39
- Floor area: 115,000 square feet (10,700 m^{2})
- Floors: 2
- Parking: 327
- Public transit: Winnipeg Transit; F5 F8
- Website: cityplacewinnipeg.com

Cityplace (formerly Eaton Place) is a nine-storey office and retail complex situated in Downtown Winnipeg, Manitoba, Canada. The number of weekly shoppers is 150,000.

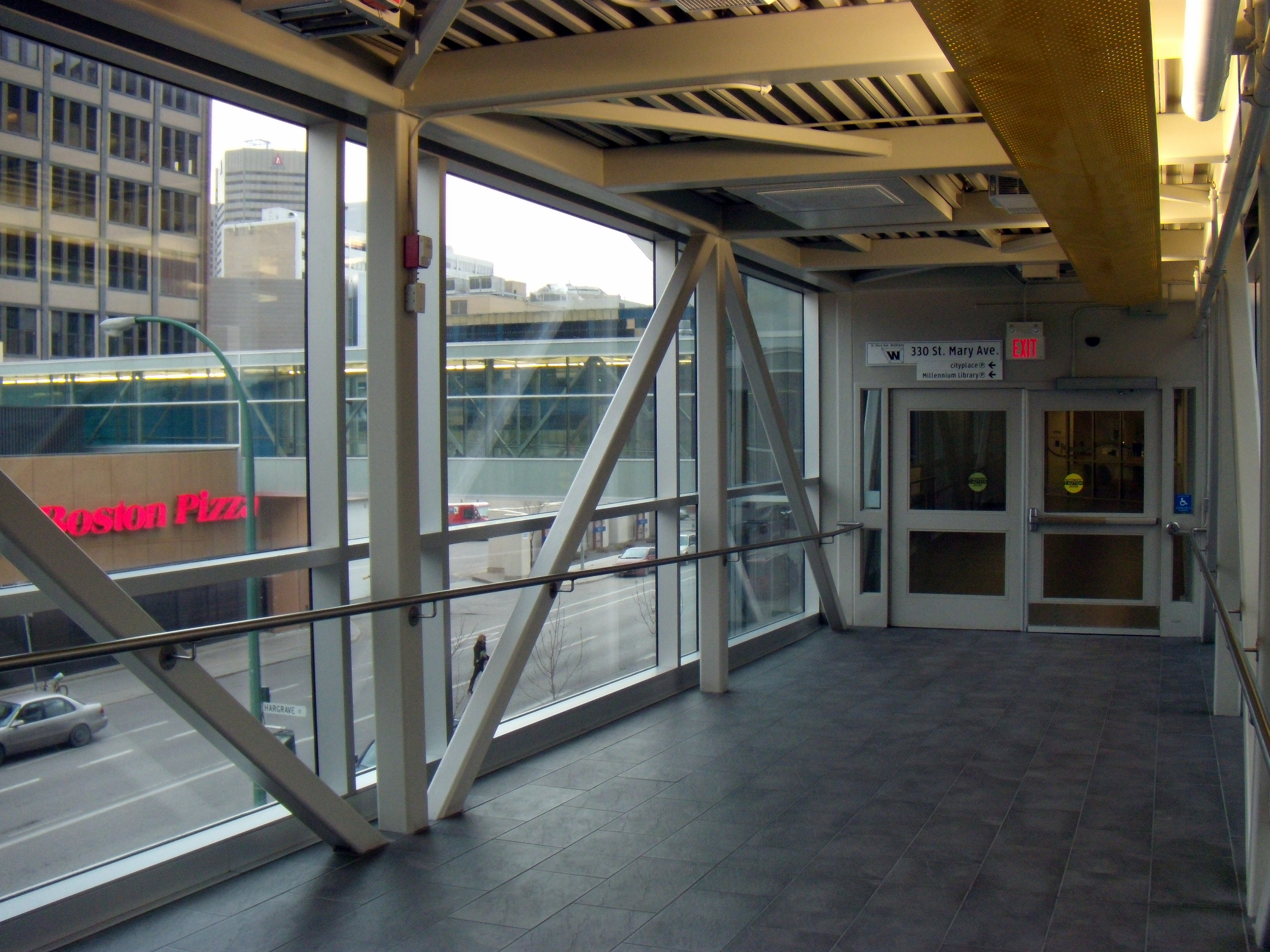
Winnipeg Walkway skywalk connection to cityplace, spanning Hargrave Street

It consists mainly of the former Eaton's company Catalogue & Mail Order building that occupies the block bounded by Hargrave and Donald Streets, and Graham and St. Mary Avenues. The warehouse was designed by John Woodman, a Winnipeg architect, and constructed in 1916.

The north side entrance is accessible from the Graham Avenue Transit Mall. Several bus routes serve nearby stops.

== History ==
In January 1976, Eaton's announced that they would discontinue printing their coloured catalogues in Winnipeg and would close down the catalogue and mail order building as of March 1. All unclaimed stock at the Catalogue Office would be sold at discount. This sale went on into the summer of 1976.

Remodelling construction began in November 1977, with the Clearance Salesroom demolished to make way for the spiral parkade.

Eaton Place opened on 11 October 1979 as downtown Winnipeg's first indoor shopping mall. It capitalized on its location adjacent to the downtown Eaton's department store, which was then the largest and busiest store in the city, now demolished. The former Eaton's store site is now the city's arena, Canada Life Centre.

Cineplex announced in June 1980 that they would build several multiplex movie theatres across Canada, and that Winnipeg would soon have 7 theatre locations, yet to be determined. In December 1980, the city's first multiplex movie theatre, Cineplex 7, opened on the second floor of Eaton Place. It was subsequently closed in the 1990s because of the small size of each theatre.

Following the opening of Portage Place in the late 1980s, the owners of Eaton Place updated the interior design to compete with the other malls that had been refurbished.

In 1998, Eaton Place was purchased for $35 million by Osmington Inc., a privately owned, Toronto-based real estate company. Israeli investors purchased the building in 2003 for an undisclosed sum. The building was then purchased by Huntingdon Real Estate Investment Trust (REIT) in 2005 for $75 million.

In 2009, the building was purchased by Manitoba Public Insurance (MPI) for $81.5 million from Huntingdon REIT. At the time of the purchase, MPI occupied approximately 80% of the office space in the building and had been leasing space there since 1980. MPI's expectation was to save $3 to $5 million annually by owning instead of renting, as well as a 10% annual return on the property investment, even after the costs of retaining the realty group for property management.

In 2010, construction completed in linking Cityplace to the adjacent Delta Hotel and Convention Centre through the Winnipeg Walkway System. The 625-foot (191 m) connection cost $6.2-million, with $4.5 million in funding coming from the Winnipeg Partnership Agreement and a combined $1.7 million from Cityplace, the Delta Winnipeg, and LaSalle Investment Management. In 2012, the mall opened a rooftop terrace, accessible from the food court on the second level.

Since late 2019, there have been numerous rumours that the Manitoba government, under Premier Brian Pallister, would seek to sell of the mall to private investors. Opposition critics in the Legislature have said that this would be a negative thing because MPI would not own its offices at that location any longer.

The Manitoba Liquor Mart closed its store in the mall in January 2020 and moved it to the second floor of True North Square across the street.

Since June 2020, McCor Management is the current property management firm of Cityplace.

== Amenities ==
The 337,000-square-foot (31,300 m^{2}) main complex includes two levels of retail and food court space totalling 115,000 square feet (10,700 m^{2}), as well as seven levels of office space. Cityplace also operates several surface parking lots and parkades. The mall also has a rooftop terrace, accessible from the food court on the second level.

Cityplace is connected by elevated skywalks to the Winnipeg Walkway System, with its second level acting as a hub on the Graham Skywalk (connecting it to the adjacent True North Square, Millennium Library, and Canada Life Centre) and a connection to the St. Mary Skywalk (with access to the Delta Winnipeg hotel and RBC Convention Centre). During the fall and winter months, Cityplace hosts the Downtown Farmers' Market.

Some of the amenities at Cityplace include:

- Food court, which includes a McDonald's, Sushi June, Za Pizza Bistro Express, Subway, Tim Hortons, Peg City Poutine
- Eaton Place Medical Centre (a walk-in clinic)
- Shark Club sports bar and gaming centre
- CIBC bank branch
- Rexall Pharmacy
- Boston Pizza
- Human Bean Coffee & Tea
- A&W
- Bodegoes

In 2013, True North Sports & Entertainment opened the Shark Club sports bar at Cityplace, which features a 5,000-square-foot (460 m^{2}) gaming parlor with 140 slot machines and six table games. The parlor is operated as a partnership with Manitoba Liqour & Lotteries, with its gaming revenues helping to subsidize True North's mortgage on Canada Life Centre. The parlor is officially branded as a "gaming centre" to distinguish it from Winnipeg's two provincially-owned commercial casinos, Club Regent and McPhillips Station.

Since its opening, the Assembly of Manitoba Chiefs (AMC)—which has lobbied for a First Nations casino in the Winnipeg market—has displayed opposition to Shark Club Gaming Centre, considering it contradictory to previous government assessments that the Winnipeg market was too oversaturated for a third casino. In October 2017, the AMC filed a lawsuit against the Manitoba government, alleging that the opening of Shark Club Gaming Centre was in violation of an agreement, ratified in 2000, obligating that five new First Nations casinos must be built in Manitoba before commercial gaming can be expanded in the province, and alleging that the government was actively preventing them from having access to the Winnipeg market. The Progressive Conservative government implemented a moratorium on expansions to gambling in 2018, which was lifted in 2023 by the new Manitoba NDP government. Premier Wab Kinew stated that his government would "certainly consider" proposals from Indigenous economic development zones such as Naawi-Oodena.
