= Crystal Casino =

- Interactive map of Crystal Casino
- Location: Winnipeg, Manitoba, Canada; 222 Broadway; 49°53′16″N 97°08′12″W
- Opened: 1990
- Closed: July 1999

The Crystal Casino was the first permanent government-owned casino in the Western Hemisphere. It opened in 1990 on the seventh floor of Fort Garry Hotel in Winnipeg, Manitoba, and was run by the Manitoba Lottery Foundation.

Two new gaming centers, the McPhillips Street Station and the Regent Station, were opened in 1993 to replace Crystal's bingo halls.

It closure was announced on May 22, 1997, with the two other Winnipeg casinos absorbing its operations by 1999.

== See also ==
- List of casinos in Canada
