= The Show Theatre =

Venue in British Columbia, Canada

- Interactive map of The Show Theatre
- Full name: The Show Theatre at the Great Canadian Casino Vancouver
- Former names: Red Robinson Show Theatre (2006–2013); The Theatre at Hard Rock Casino Vancouver (2013–2016); The Molson Canadian Theatre (2016–2023)
- Location: Great Canadian Casino Vancouver; Coquitlam, British Columbia
- Coordinates: 49.2279°N 122.8367°W
- Owner: Petroglyph Development Group
- Operator: Live Nation
- Capacity: 1,074
- Type: Proscenium

Construction
- Opened: September 16, 2006; 20 years ago

The Show Theatre in Coquitlam, British Columbia, Canada, is a 1,074-seat live event theatre adjoining the Great Canadian Casino Vancouver. The venue opened with a show by Little Richard in 2006, and was named The Red Robinson Show Theatre for local radio legend Red Robinson. It was later briefly called The Theatre at Hard Rock Casino Vancouver and changed its name again to the Molson Canadian Theatre in 2016 due to a sponsorship. The theatre was rebranded again in late 2023 alongside the casino.

Acts appearing at the theatre have included singers Tony Bennett, Jewel, Paul Anka, Olivia Newton-John and Chris Cornell; pop/rock groups Barenaked Ladies, The Beach Boys, and Judas Priest; comedians Dennis Miller, Jay Leno, Howie Mandel, and Bill Maher; country acts Kenny Rogers, Randy Travis, and Wynonna; and plays and musicals including Cats.

== History ==
The Red Robinson Show Theatre, named for local radio personality Red Robinson, opened on September 16, 2006, at the Boulevard Casino in Coquitlam, British Columbia. The theatre's opening day had planned performances from Little Richard, Brent Butt, Roseanne Barr, Huey Lewis and the News, and Bachman/Cummings.

The Great Canadian Gaming Corporation announced in late 2013 that it would rename the theatre alongside the casino's rebranding under the Hard Rock brand. Singer Michael Bublé opposed the renaming, among others on an online petition against it. Later in 2013, its name was changed to The Theatre at the Hard Rock Casino Vancouver. It became the Molson Canadian Theatre in April 2016 due to a sponsorship by the Molson Brewery. The theatre was renamed again in December 2023 alongside the casino.

== Seating ==
The 21,000-square-foot (2,000 m^{2}) multi-purpose venue is the largest theatre in the world to use the spiral lift system which allows independent row configurations. There are four configurations possible:

- Standard Theatre
- Rock Concert
- Cabaret
- Cabaret with Dance Floor

The television series Psych filmed a concert scene at the theatre in 2007.
