= Casino Nanaimo =

Casino Nanaimo may refer to:

- Casino Nanaimo, a casino in Nanaimo, British Columbia run by Great Canadian Entertainment
- "Casino Nanaimo", a 2007 single by The Besnard Lakes, named after the above casino
