= Manitoba Lotteries Corporation =

Defunct gambling corporation in Manitoba, Canada

- The logo of the Manitoba Lotteries Corporation
- Company type: Crown corporation
- Industry: Gambling industry
- Founded: 1993
- Defunct: 2013
- Successor: Manitoba Liquor & Lotteries Corporation
- Headquarters: Manitoba, Canada
- Area served: Manitoba

The Manitoba Lotteries Corporation (MLC) was a Crown corporation that controlled and operated gambling in the Canadian province of Manitoba. It managed two casinos in Winnipeg: McPhillips Station Casino and Club Regent Casino. MLC also operated video lottery terminals, and is responsible for the distribution of all lottery products to a network of retailers in the province. MLC was succeeded by the Manitoba Liquor & Lotteries Corporation in 2013.

The first lottery in Manitoba started in 1970 through special legislation. By 1993, the Manitoba Lotteries Corporation had been established as a Crown corporation.

== Community Support ==
$273 million was given to the Province of Manitoba in 2004-05 by 2006-2007 that number had reached 282.7 million. This income goes back to the community in a number of ways $65 million in VLT revenues was donated in the form of unconditional grants to Manitoba municipalities, including 4.6 million to Rural Municipalities, $30,625 to Pinawa, $270,543 to Villages, 1.6 million to Towns, 1.7 million to Steinbach, Brandon, Dauphin, Flin Flon, Portage la Prairie, Selkirk, Thompson, and Winkler, and $173,811 to Northern Communities. The remainder of the net income is given to the Government of Manitoba that provide health care, education, community and social services and economic development for Manitobans.

MLC also provided 1.8 million in sponsorships to community events, the Winnipeg Comedy Tour, the Winnipeg Blue Bombers, Winnipeg Goldeyes, Manitoba Moose, as well as Assiniboia Downs and Manitoba Marathon.

MLC's economic impact on the Province of Manitoba is about 340 million.

Today, the MLL (now Manitoba Liquor and Lotteries) employs over 2,000 people. Some of which are members of the Teamsters Local 979 Food and Beverage staff who are members of the Manitoba Government Employees Union. There are at least 5 different unions within Manitoba Liquor and Lotteries. It has its headquarters in Winnipeg, Manitoba, Canada.

In October 2008, MLC was named one of Manitoba's Top Employers, which was announced by the Winnipeg Free Press newspaper.
