= Manitoba Liquor & Lotteries Corporation =

Crown agency of the government of Manitoba, Canada

- Type: Crown corporation
- Predecessor: Manitoba Liquor Control Commission; Manitoba Lotteries Corporation
- Founded: 2013
- Headquarters: 830 Empress St., Winnipeg, Manitoba R3G 3H3
- Key people: Jeff Traeger, Chair; Gerry Sul, President & CEO
- Services: Liquor stores; Club Regent Casino; McPhillips Station Casino; PlayNow.com; Manitoba VLTs; Lottery tickets
- Manitoba Liquor & Lotteries Corporation

Corporation overview
- Type: Liquor retailer and licenser; Gaming control board
- Minister responsible: Glen Simard, Minister responsible for Manitoba Liquor and Lotteries
- Parent department: Manitoba Crown Services
- Key documents: Manitoba Liquor and Lotteries Corporation Act; Liquor, Gaming and Cannabis Control Act
- Website: www.mbll.ca/

Manitoba Liquor & Lotteries Corporation (MBLL) is a Crown corporation of the Manitoba government responsible for providing legalized gambling ("gaming"), distributing and selling liquor, and for sourcing and distributing non-medical cannabis to retailers in the province of Manitoba.

Its gaming services include selling Western Canada Lottery Corporation products via lottery ticket retailers, operating the Casinos of Winnipeg—Club Regent Casino and McPhillips Station Casino—operating PlayNow.com, and providing VLTs to the province. As a liquor retailer, MBLL operate 63 Liquor Mart and Liquor Mart Express stores throughout Manitoba.

Liquor, cannabis and gambling products are regulated by the Liquor, Gaming and Cannabis Authority of Manitoba (LGCA), who "licenses charitable gambling activities, ensures the technical integrity of games and equipment, monitors compliance, and does other activities required of the regulator."

MBLL was created in 2013 with the merger of the Manitoba Liquor Control Commission (MLCC) and Manitoba Lotteries Corporation (MLC). Its headquarters are located in the provincial capital, Winnipeg.

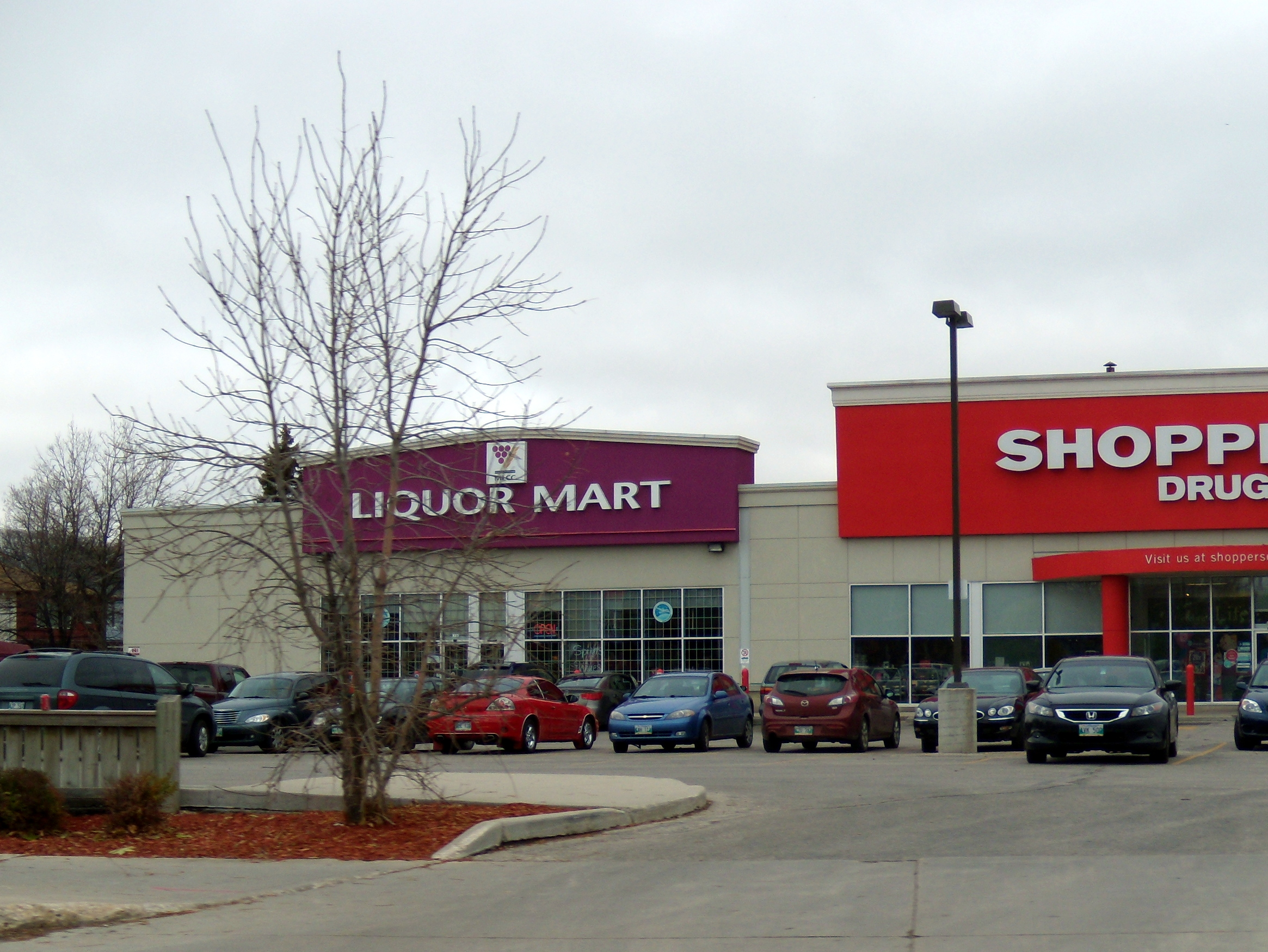
A MBLL-operated Liquor Mart retail outlet in Winnipeg

== History ==
The Manitoba Liquor Control Commission (MLCC) was established in 1923 via the Liquor Control Act to control the sale of alcoholic beverages in Manitoba. The Act empowered the commission to buy, import, and sell liquor; control the possession, sale and transportation of liquor; and to establish liquor outlets throughout the province. In 1982, MLCC opened the first duty-free liquor store in Canada, outside of an airport in Emerson.

In 1984, responsibility over the operation of all casinos and distribution of lottery tickets and bingo paper was assumed by Manitoba Lotteries Foundation, who acquired 3 full-time bingo halls in Winnipeg (including Bonanza Bingo and Pot O’Gold Bingo Hall). Five years later, in 1989, Crystal Casino opened in the Hotel Fort Garry, becoming the first continental-style casino in North America and the first year-round government-operated casino in Canada.

The Manitoba Lotteries Foundation became a crown corporation in 1993, re-establishing itself as the Manitoba Lotteries Corporation (MLC), with responsibility over regulating all gambling in the province, as well as operating the McPhillips Station Casino and Club Regent Casino in Winnipeg. In 1999, Crystal Casino closed while the two remaining casinos were renovated and expanded in time for the 13th Pan-Am Games in Winnipeg.

In 2001, The Liquor Control Act was amended to allow for the sale of liquor on Sundays. On 15 February 2002, the Aseneskak Casino officially opened, on Opaskwayak Cree Nation near The Pas. The second First Nations casino in Manitoba followed on 28 May 2005 with the South Beach Casino.

In 2013, partnering with True North Sports & Entertainment, MLC opened the Shark Club Gaming Centre—a sports bar, grill and gaming centre—in Cityplace mall. On 22 June 2014 came the opening of Sand Hills Casino, the third First Nations casino in Manitoba.

On 1 April 2014, the Manitoba Liquor and Lotteries Corporation Act and the Manitoba Liquor and Gaming Control Act came into effect, wherein most of the powers of both MLCC and MLC were assumed by the Manitoba Liquor & Lotteries Corporation. More specifically, the acts transferred regulatory oversight for liquor from the MLCC to the new Liquor and Gaming Authority of Manitoba, while combining the sale and distribution of liquor and gambling products under MBLL.

== Services ==
The Manitoba Liquor & Lotteries Corporation is responsible for providing legalized gambling ("gaming"), distributing and selling liquor, and for sourcing and distributing non-medical cannabis to retailers in Manitoba.

One of MBLL's responsibilities is providing legalized gambling ("gaming") in Manitoba. These gaming services include selling Western Canada Lottery Corporation products via lottery ticket retailers, operating the Casinos of Winnipeg—Club Regent Casino and McPhillips Station Casino—operating PlayNow.com, and providing VLTs to the province.

As a liquor retailer, MBLL operate 63 Liquor Mart and Liquor Mart Express stores throughout Manitoba.

Liquor and gambling products are regulated by the Liquor and Gaming Authority of Manitoba (LGA), who "licenses charitable gambling activities, ensures the technical integrity of games and equipment, monitors compliance, and does other activities required of the regulator."

== Social responsibility campaigns ==
MBLL runs several social responsibility programs to promote the responsible sale and consumption of beverage alcohol and responsible gambling. Manitoba Lotteries introduced its "Responsible Gaming Policy & Strategy" in 2001, helping to form a steering committee, which later became the Canadian Partnership for Responsible Gambling, focused on responsible gambling in Canada.

Many have been carried over from MBLL's predecessors.

- "Be UnDrunk" – a binge drinking awareness program
- "Be With Child-Without Alcohol" – an alcohol and pregnancy advertisement program
- "Be Safe & Sober" – an anti-drunk driving campaign
- "Be the Influence" – a program to influence children's attitudes towards alcohol
- "Report Impaired Driving: Call 911" – a program partnered with MPI, MADD Canada, and the city of Brandon Police Service to encourage drivers to report impaired drivers
- "Operation Red Nose" – an annual safe-ride-home program.

== See also ==
- Official website
