= Great Canadian Casino Vancouver =

Gaming complex in Coquitlam, British Columbia, Canada

Coordinates: 49.227306°N 122.837158°W

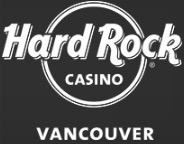

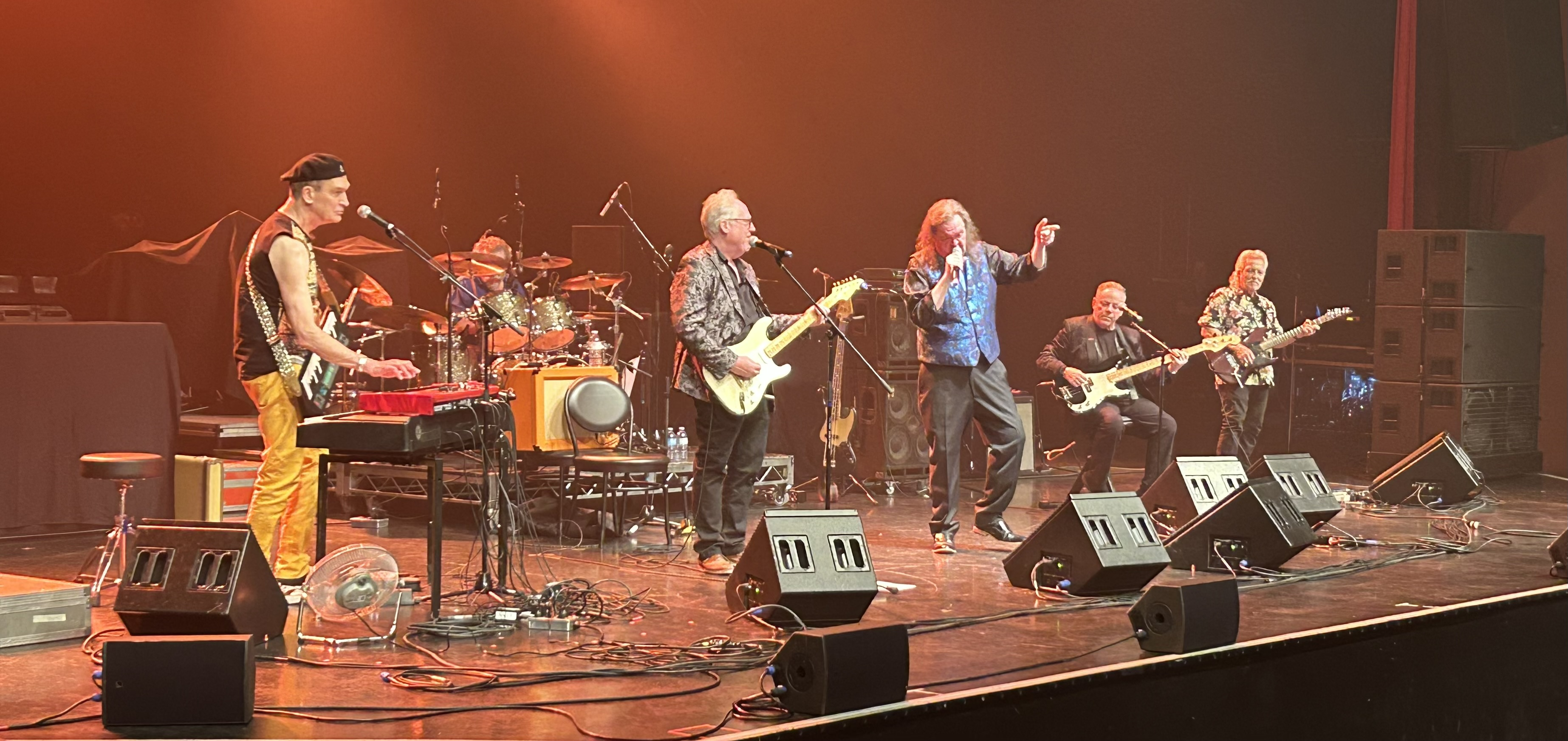
- Doug and the Slugs (March 2026)
- Interactive map of Great Canadian Casino Vancouver
- Location: Coquitlam, British Columbia, Canada; 2080 United Blvd, V3K 6W3
- Opened: October 13, 2001; 25 years ago
- Theme: Rock and roll
- Gaming space: 80,000 square feet (7,400 m^{2})
- Signature attractions: The Show Theatre
- Notable restaurants: Gordon Ramsay Burger; Asylum Restaurant; Fuel Cafe; QSR
- Casino type: Land-based
- Owner: Petroglyph Development Group
- Previous names: Casino Coquitlam; Boulevard Casino; Hard Rock Casino
- Renovated in: 2005–2006; July–December 2013
- Website: Official website

Great Canadian Casino Vancouver in Coquitlam, British Columbia is the largest casino in the province of British Columbia by gaming space. The casino is open 24 hours a day and as of May 2026 is owned by Petroglyph Development Group. The former owner was Great Canadian Entertainment, which now licenses their name to the new owners.

The casino opened in October 2001 as the Casino Coquitlam. It was renamed Boulevard Casino in 2005/2006 with the addition of the Red Robinson Show Theatre, which was briefly and controversially rebranded The Theatre at the Hard Rock Casino Vancouver in late 2013 before becoming the Molson Canadian Theatre in May 2016 following a sponsorship. The casino itself was also rebranded as the Hard Rock Casino Vancouver before becoming Great Canadian Casino in late 2023, and the arena became the Show Theatre.

== History ==
=== 1996–2013: As Casino Coquitlam and Boulevard Casino ===
In 1996, the provincial NDP government allowed an expanded gambling initiative supporting slot machines, higher betting limits, and the creation of permanent casinos over temporary gaming halls. Great Canadian Entertainment planned to relocate its casino from Delta to Richmond, but this was rejected, as Richmond was initially concerned regarding the expansion before both cities later reverted these restrictions.

Great Canadian opened the Casino Coquitlam on October 13, 2001, and in 2005/2006, it was renamed the Boulevard Casino following a $105 million expansion and a renovation that added a parking garage that can hold 1,600 cars, and the 21,000-square-foot (2,000 m^{2}) Red Robinson Show Theatre with a seating capacity of 1,074 and a spiral lift system. According to their 2006–2007 annual report, Boulevard Casino was the third most profitable gaming venue in B.C., earning over $158 million, an increase of $28.9 million from the previous year, attributed to the new show theatre hosting up to 5,000 guests on show nights.

The funding agreement with the province means the casino must give 10% of its net take to the City of Coquitlam. In 2010, Coquitlam received $8.2 million, which was used for a community group fund and major capital projects.

=== 2013–2023: As Hard Rock Casino ===
On July 3, 2013, Great Canadian announced a sublicensing agreement from HRHH IP, LLC, an affiliate of Brookfield Property Partners that owned Hard Rock Hotel & Casino Las Vegas and the rights to the Hard Rock Hotel and Casino brand west of the Mississippi River, informally the "Morton Territories." This agreement would include the rebranding of the Boulevard Casino to Hard Rock Casino Vancouver, named after Metro Vancouver, though the property did not have the rights to rebrand its theatre Hard Rock Live or feature an actual Hard Rock Cafe. Instead, announced on October 17 of that year, the arena would be rebranded as the Theatre at the Hard Rock Casino Vancouver, which sparked severe local criticism by November. Red Robinson himself was disappointed when the main sign was destroyed, while another was stripped off of the building.

Hard Rock Casino Vancouver had its grand opening on December 20, 2013 as the first ever Hard Rock Casino location in Canada with a massive guitar flash mob, fireworks, music memorabilia from famous figures Pearl Jam, Madonna, Elvis Presley, and Bruce Springsteen. The $15 million renovation included an expanded 80,000-square-foot (7,400 m^{2}) gaming floor with over 950 slot machines, Stake Steakhouse, the Asylum Restaurant, Unlisted Lounge, a four-eatery food court, and new carpets and paint.

In late May 2016, the theatre was rebranded again as the Molson Canadian Theatre due to a sponsorship. On September 30, 2016, Seminole Tribe of Florida-owned Hard Rock International acquired all of the western territorial rights, which dissolved the sublicensing deal to have the Vancouver casino's name licensed directly by Hard Rock. In May 2018, roughly 400 employees represented by the BC General Employees' Union (BCGEU) done a strike action in protest to unfair wages and bad working conditions, leading to the cancellation of several summer events, including the popular, yearly Ultimate Car Show.

=== 2023–present: As Great Canadian Casino ===
In December 2023, it was rebranded again to Great Canadian Casino Vancouver.

In December 2025, it was announced that the casino would be acquired by Petroglyph Development Group, a wholly owned corporation of the Snuneymuxw First Nation. The transaction was subject to customary closing conditions and required regulatory and third-party approvals.

== See also ==
- List of casinos in Canada
- Golden Nugget Lake Tahoe
