= Metropolitan Theatre (Winnipeg) =

Theatre in Winnipeg, Manitoba, Canada

Metropolitan Entertainment Centre
- The Met
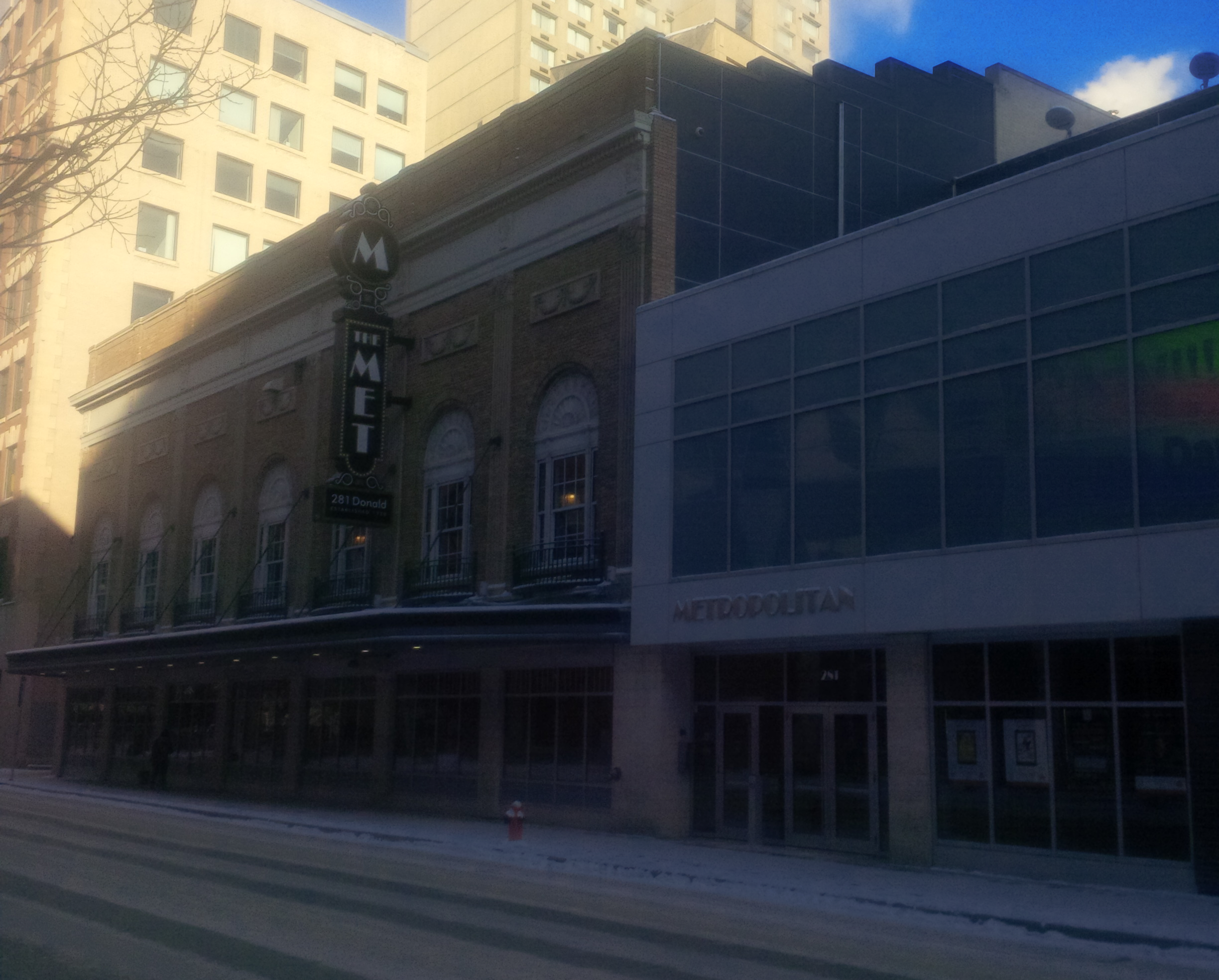
- Metropolitan Theatre in downtown Winnipeg
- Interactive map of Metropolitan Entertainment Centre
- Former names: Allen Theatre (1919–1923); Metropolitan Theatre (1923–1987)
- Address: 281 Donald St.
- Location: Winnipeg, Manitoba, Canada
- Coordinates: 49°53′35″N 97°8′34″W
- Owner: Canad Inns
- Type: Theatre

Construction
- Opened: 2 January 1920
- Renovated: 2012
- Architect: C. Howard Crane

Website
- www.themetwinnipeg.com

National Historic Site of Canada
- Official name: Metropolitan Theatre National Historic Site of Canada
- Designated: June 10, 1991
- Reference no.: 3110

Municipally Designated Site
- Designation: Winnipeg Landmark Heritage Structure
- Recognized: January 10, 1997
- CRHP listing: July 13, 2007
- Recognition authority: City of Winnipeg
- ID: 7725

The Metropolitan Entertainment Centre, also known as the Met Entertainment Centre or simply The Met, and formerly the Metropolitan Theatre, is a theatre in downtown Winnipeg, Manitoba, Canada. Designed by American architect C. Howard Crane, it is located at 281 Donald Street, across from Canada Life Centre and north of the Holy Trinity Anglican Church.

It was originally known as Allen Theatre, after its owners the Allen brothers, who built a chain of cinemas throughout Canada in the early 20th century. After its acquisition by Famous Players in 1923, it was renamed the Metropolitan Theatre. It is one of four surviving theatres built by the Allen brothers in Canada, and one of three surviving Canadian buildings designed by Crane.

The theatre was renovated in 1948 and was shuttered in November 1987. It was designated a National Historic Site of Canada in 1991 and was sold to Canad Inns in 2006, which with other investors was to convert the building for use as a rock and roll museum. Those plans were scuttled, but by 2011 work was undertaken to renovate the building to reflect its original design. The renovated building was opened in November 2012 featuring a restaurant, lounge, and special events facilities.

== History ==
=== Background ===
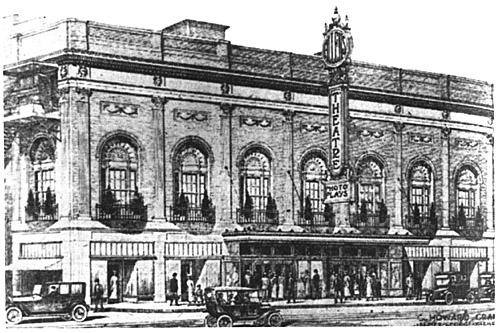
Illustration of the Allen Theatre at its opening in 1919

The Allen family of Brantford, Ontario, consisting of brothers Jay J. Allen and Jules Allen and their father Bernard Allen, was in the midst of creating the largest cinema chain in Canada in the early 20th century.

The theatre was one of 45 in the chain owned by the brothers. Designed by C. Howard Crane, who designed all theatres in the Allen brothers chain, the 24,000-square-foot (2,200 m^{2}) neoclassical building was constructed in 1919 and named the Allen Theatre. Crane was employed by Elmer George Kichler and Associates, but opened an office in Windsor, Ontario, to attend to the numerous projects he worked on in Canada.

It was opened with a formal ceremony on 2 January 1920. The Allen's had expected to open on Christmas Day 1919, but the organ had not yet been installed and some of the interior finishes had not yet been applied. The first film it screened was Upstairs and Down.

In 1923, it was purchased by Famous Players, who renamed it the Metropolitan Theatre and operated it as a first-run theatre. In 1948, it was renovated, with the box office and entrance being relocated to the north end of the building, the ceiling dropped, and the candy counter expanded.

=== Closure ===
On 26 November 1987 it was closed after its final screening of Date with an Angel, a romantic comedy film. In 2006, the city-owned CentreVenture Development Corporation sold the theatre to Canad Inns for $100,000, which intended to convert the building for use as a museum devoted to rock and roll, a venture that also involved several prominent business leaders in the city, including Leonard Asper.

The theatre was designated a National Historic Site of Canada in 1991. It is one of four surviving theatres built by the Allen brothers in Canada, and one of three surviving Canadian buildings designed by Crane.

=== Renovation ===
Vacant for 25 years from its closure in 1987, the theatre was renovated "to its original incarnation as the Allen Theatre" by Canad Inns. The renovation began in 2011, with $17 million of the funding provided by Canad Inns, $1.5 million by the municipal government of Winnipeg as a heritage grant from the Heritage Investment Reserve Fund, and $1.5 million from the provincial Government of Manitoba. The provincial grant was contingent on the building being available for use by nonprofit organizations 30 days per year.

The city grant required completion of the renovations by 2013. The theatre became a central component of a new entertainment and hospitality district planned by a city agency for the redevelopment of an 11-block area of downtown Winnipeg. Despite interior water damage sustained since its closure, the "interior [was] in remarkably good condition". The renovation included construction of a structure on the south side of the building for a new kitchen, bathrooms, and elevators. The original sloped floors were replaced by tiered platforms, and heritage elements such as the front facade, main entrance, mezzanine, and mouldings were preserved, Heritage elements that had been destroyed or damaged by previous renovations were reconstructed. Other work included removal of a false canopy, brick repointing, installation of new windows and interior back-lighting.

The building was reopened to the public on 30 November 2012 at an invitation-only unveiling.

== Structure ==
The building was situated on a block on the east side of Donald Street south of Portage Avenue, which the Allen brothers had created from the purchase of smaller lots including a billiard hall, a florist, a tailor, and a Chinese merchant. It faced the Eaton's store, a mammoth eight-story structure owned by the largest employer in the city.

The auditorium had a capacity of 2,500, was topped by a plaster ceiling dome from which hung a large chandelier, and had a matching pair of staircases leading to a mezzanine. The exterior consisted of a light-brown bricks with ornamental terra cotta designs. Fluted pilasters flank the arch windows, each of which is topped by a fanlight and a terra cotta swag and is fronted by a wrought-iron faux balcony. The cornice is topped by a brick parapet and features low relief work of urns and friezes.

The original ground floor consisted of the theatre's entrance flanked by shallow, wide shops with large windows. These shops were separated by partitions that were later removed, creating one shop to the north and one to the south of the entrance. The north shop (285 Donald Street) housed a confectionery store, and the south shop (283 Donald Street) housed a series of tenants, including a blouse shop, a barber, an optician, and a music store.

== Facility ==
Now named Metropolitan Entertainment Centre, it houses a restaurant, lounge, and special event facilities, and has a 35-by-26-foot (10.7 by 7.9 m) screen. These are used for concerts, fundraising events, film screenings, and gala dinners. It has also screened some Winnipeg Jets playoff hockey games, and hosted the team's NHL entry draft parties.

The restaurant employees between 20 and 30 individuals, with staffing increased to as many as 50 employees for events. It hosts dinner and movie nights, which include a buffet dinner, a movie, and popcorn. It also operates a supper club.
