= Georgian Downs =

Canadian casino and horse racing track

- Location: 7485 5th Sideroad, Innisfil, Ontario L9S 3S1
- Coordinates: 44°17′32″N 79°41′22″W
- Owned by: Ontario Lottery and Gaming Corporation (50%); Gateway Casinos & Entertainment Limited (50%)
- Operated by: Great Canadian Entertainment
- Date opened: November 2001
- Race type: Standardbred
- Course type: Flat dirt, 5/8 mile

Georgian Downs is a casino and horse racing track in Innisfil, Ontario, Canada. The racetrack hosts standardbred races from June to August. The racetrack has an on-site casino called Gateway Casinos Innisfil, which contains close to 1000 slot machines, numerous e-tables and 26 live table games. The Town of Innisfil has received $97,475,109 from the casino since its opening in 2001.

== History ==
Construction of the racetrack began in the fall of 2000. The racetrack opened to the public on November 13, 2001, with a total construction cost of approximately $30 million.
