= River Rock Casino Resort =

Casino in British Columbia, Canada

Coordinates: 49.196257°N 123.128141°W

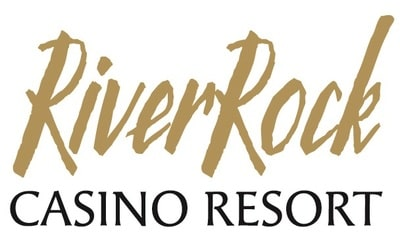

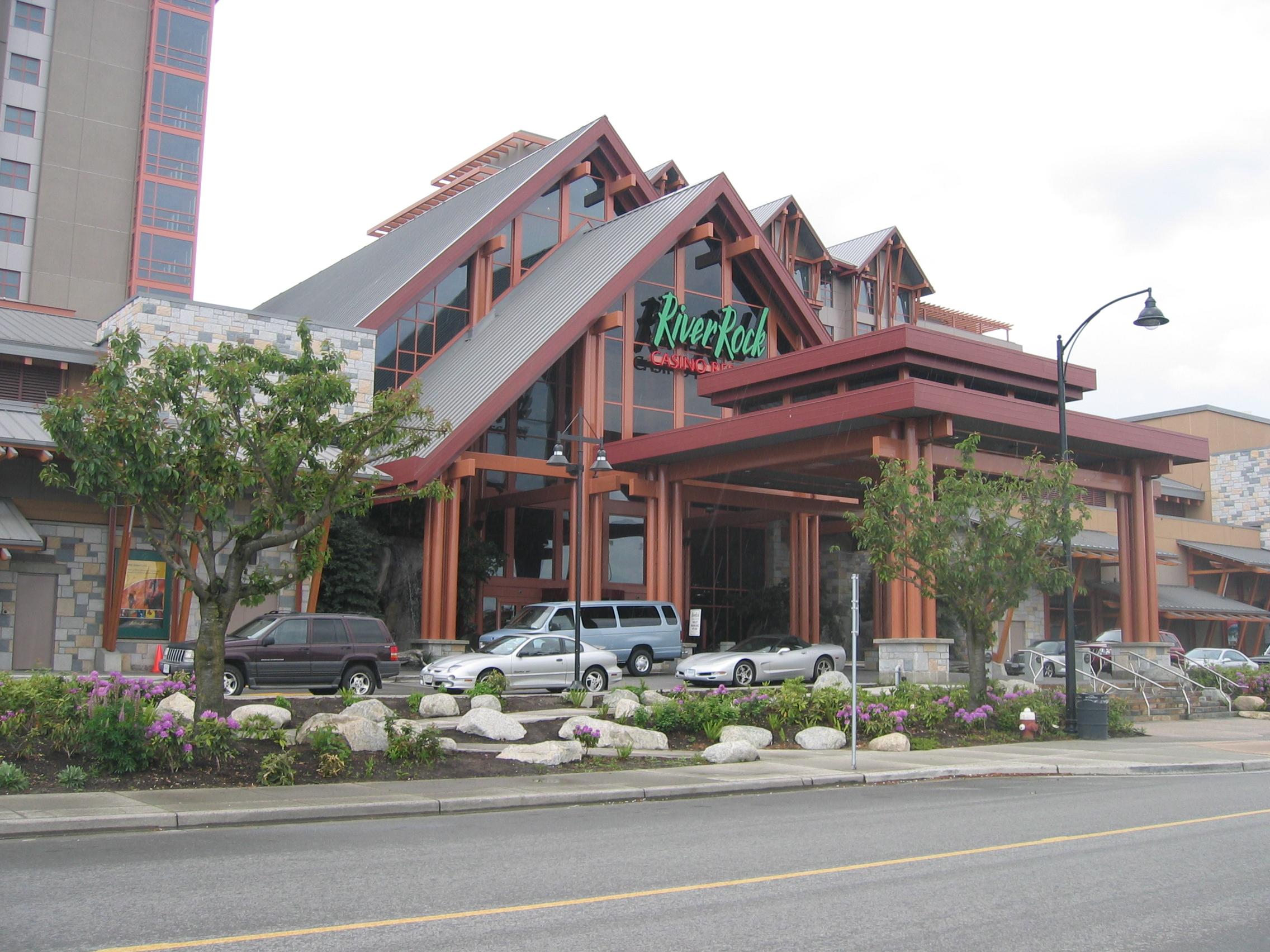
- Interactive map of River Rock Casino Resort
- Location: 8811 River Road Richmond, British Columbia V6X 3P8
- Opened: June 25, 2004; 22 years ago
- Theme: West Coast rainforest
- No. of rooms: 396
- Gaming space: 70,000 sq ft (6,500 m^{2})
- Permanent shows: None
- Signature attractions: River Rock Show Theatre
- Casino type: Land-Based
- Owner: Great Canadian Entertainment
- Architect: DA Architects + Planners
- Previous names: None
- Renovated in: 2009
- Website: riverrock.com

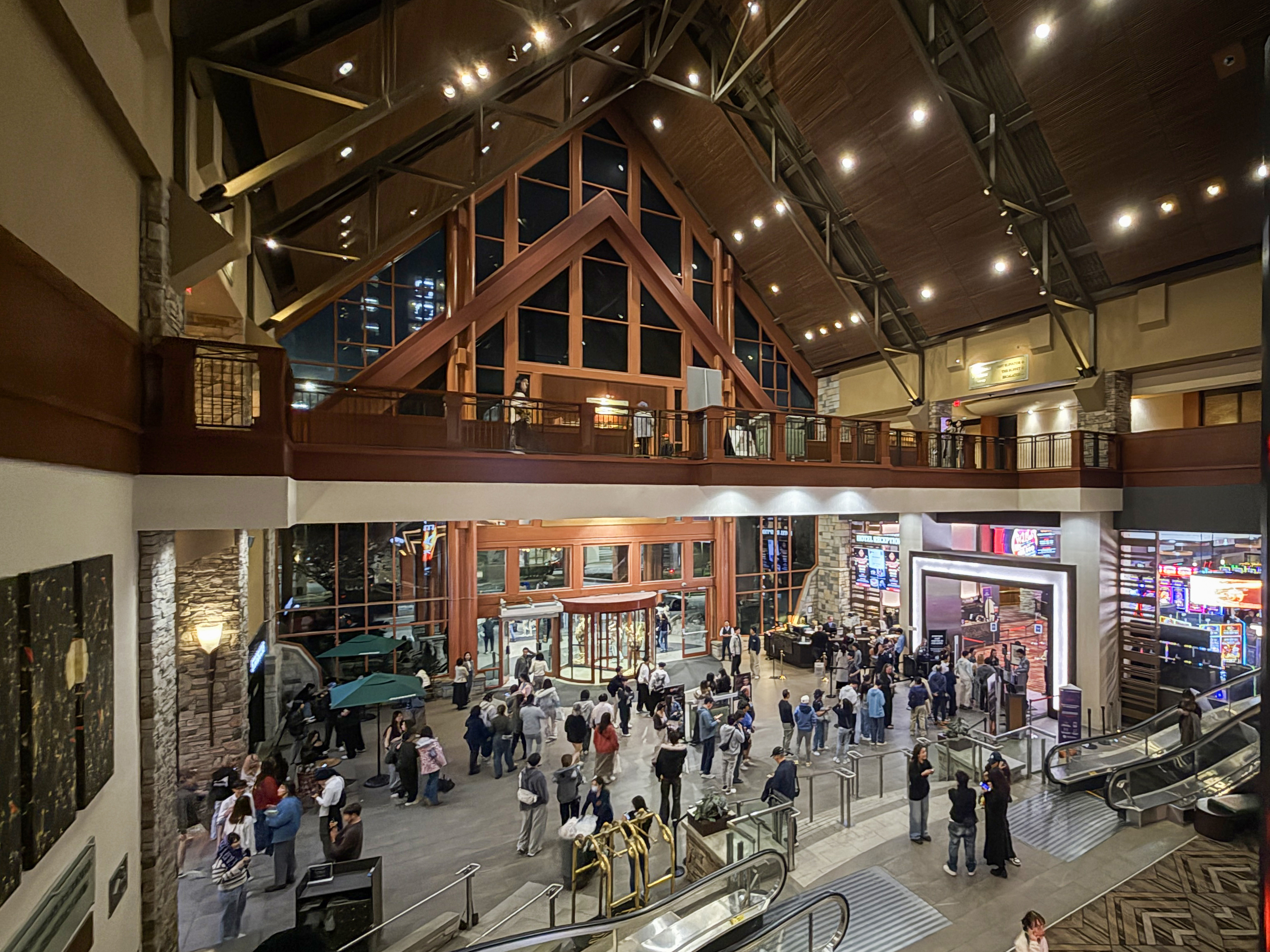
River Rock Casino's lobby

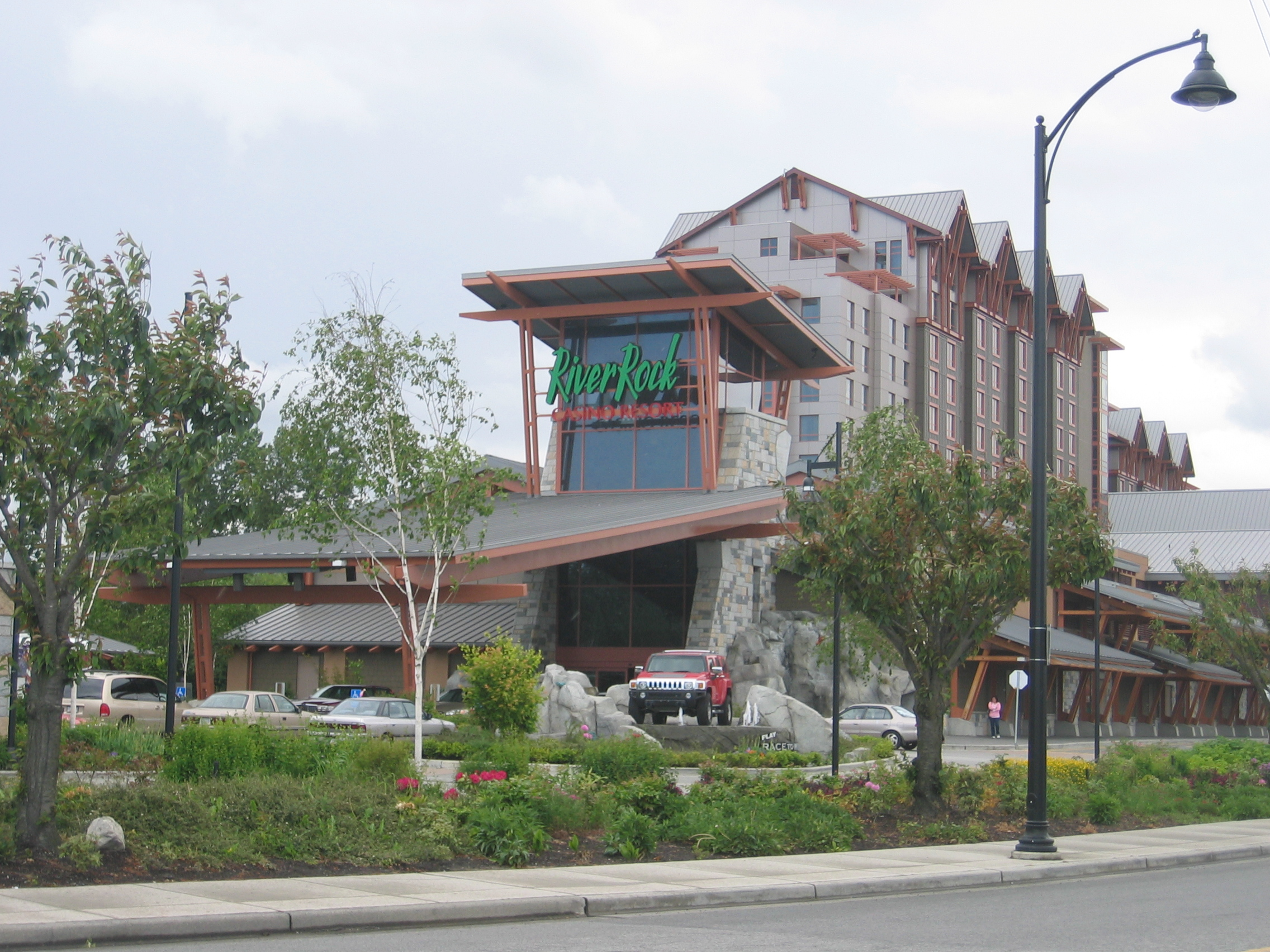
River Rock Casino's west entrance

River Rock Casino Resort is casino hotel located in Richmond, British Columbia along the Fraser River. Owned by Great Canadian Entertainment, the River Rock has historically been BC's largest and most profitable casino. The casino offers 80 table games and 1,150 electronic gaming machines (including slots and electronic table games), as well as a poker room and off-track betting parlour. The hotel has a total of 396 rooms, including standard rooms and suites, as well as a 144-berth marina.

== History ==
The casino was built on the site of the former Bridgepoint Market in Richmond. It first opened to the public on June 25, 2004. Several variances were needed from the City of Richmond to allow it to open with service that customers expect. This included a modification of its liquor licence and operating licence to allow liquor to be consumed in the casino's theatre.

It hosted the British Columbia Poker Championships in November 2005, 2006 and 2007. The premier event of the Johnny Chan Poker Championship was also held in 2007.

The 2006 Gemini Awards were presented at the River Rock Casino Resort, marking the ceremony's West Coast debut; the event is normally held in Toronto.

The River Rock has occasionally been used as a filming location for Vancouver-based film and television productions. On November 2006, three photographers made their way onto a closed section of the hotel's balcony intending to photograph actress Denise Richards during filming of the movie Blonde and Blonder. In an ensuing argument, she allegedly threw a laptop belonging to one of the photographers off the balcony, striking the arm of an elderly woman in a wheelchair.

In 2024, Great Canadian Entertainment announced plans to renovate the resort in honour of its 20th anniversary, including new restaurants (such as Gordon Ramsay Steak, Koi, and Miku), renovated and expanded event spaces, a refurbishment of the River Rock Theatre, and the dredging of its marina to allow a restoration of service

In October 2025, the Snuneymuxw First Nation announced that it would acquire the River Rock Casino Resort from Great Canadian Entertainment for an undisclosed sum. The purchase is in partnership with the Musqueam First Nation, whose land on which the resort is situated.

== Transportation ==
The casino is located about five minutes from Vancouver International Airport, on Richmond's Sea Island. It is also near Highway 99, the main highway connecting Vancouver to the southern suburbs.

The casino is served by Bridgeport Station on the Canada Line SkyTrain, located across from the casino. Bus service, operated by TransLink, is provided via bus routes within walking distance of the casino. In 2006, TransLink reached an agreement to provide $9.5 million in land and $4.5 million in cash funding for a 1,200-space parkade to serve the casino, and as a Bridgeport Station park and ride site.

== Loan sharking controversy ==
A report released by the British Columbia Lottery Corporation showed that out of 56 incidents of a casino patron in British Columbia being barred from gambling for suspected loan sharking activity, 34 of those incidents took place at River Rock. Controversy within Richmond was further stirred when the RCMP admitted it could do little to stop loan sharking unless a victim came forward, yet it was the suspected motive for a variety of kidnappings, extortions, threats and violence. The most prominent case occurred when Rong Lilly Li, a suspected loan shark, disappeared after last being seen getting into a van outside the casino on 26 May 2006. Her body was finally recovered on the weekend of 9–10 September 2006.

A June 2016 audit found that the casino knowingly allowed high rollers to buy chips with funds from lenders with anti-money laundering restrictions who were being investigated by the Royal Canadian Mounted Police.

== Concerts and pageants ==
Miss Chinese (Vancouver) Pageant have been hosted at the casino venue in 2009 and has been used as venue for Cantopop stars from Hong Kong for their North American tours.

== See also ==
- List of casinos in Canada
- Project Sidewinder
- Wilful Blindness (2021 book)
