= Casino Rama =

Casino and hotel in Ontario, Canada

Coordinates: 44°38′50″N 79°21′1″W

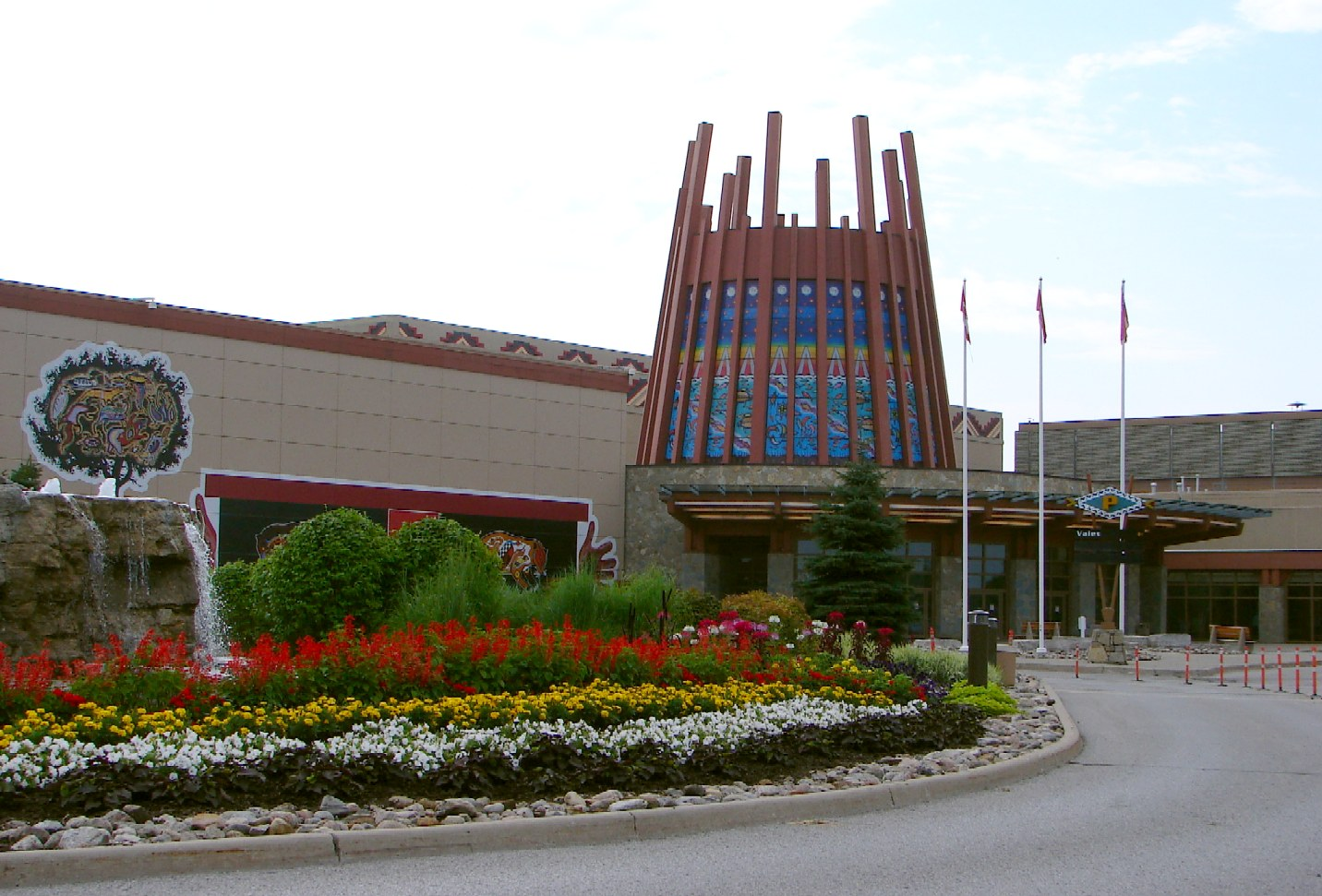
- Interactive map of Casino Rama
- Location: 5899 Rama Rd Rama, Ontario, Canada
- Opened: July 31, 1996
- No. of rooms: 289
- Gaming space: 192,000 sq ft (17,800 m^{2})
- Notable restaurants: Atlas at St. Germain's, Couchiching Court Buffet, The Weirs, Match, Tim Hortons and Chow.
- Owner: Chippewas of Rama First Nation; Ontario Lottery and Gaming Corporation
- Operating license holder: Gateway Casinos & Entertainment Limited
- Website: Official Casino Rama Site

Casino Rama is a large casino, hotel, and entertainment complex located in the town of Rama, Ontario, on the reserve land of the Chippewas of Rama First Nation. It is jointly owned by the Chippewas of Rama First Nation and the Ontario Lottery and Gaming Corporation, with operation of the casino contracted to Gateway Casinos & Entertainment Limited.

Casino Rama is Ontario's only First Nations "commercial casino" (as opposed to a lower-ranking charity casino) and the largest First Nations casino in Canada. The casino also includes several restaurants and a hotel and spa, as well as an acclaimed theatre, the Entertainment Center, which features seats for over 5,000 people and regularly hosts top-billing international shows and artists.

== History ==
The casino opened on July 31, 1996.

In 2007, a group of people, including several of the casino's employees, were arrested after police investigated a $2 million scam involving cheating at baccarat.

In 2013, Casino Rama underwent a multimillion-dollar renovation.

In November 2016, the resort's private computer system fell victim to a cyberattack, from which the sensitive financial and contact details of casino guests, and staff, was gleaned from the database by hackers.

Casino Rama temporarily closed on March 16, 2020, due to COVID-19 regulations, announcing its reopening in the light of the COVID-19 situation at the beginning of July 2021 and reopened on July 29.

== Facilities ==
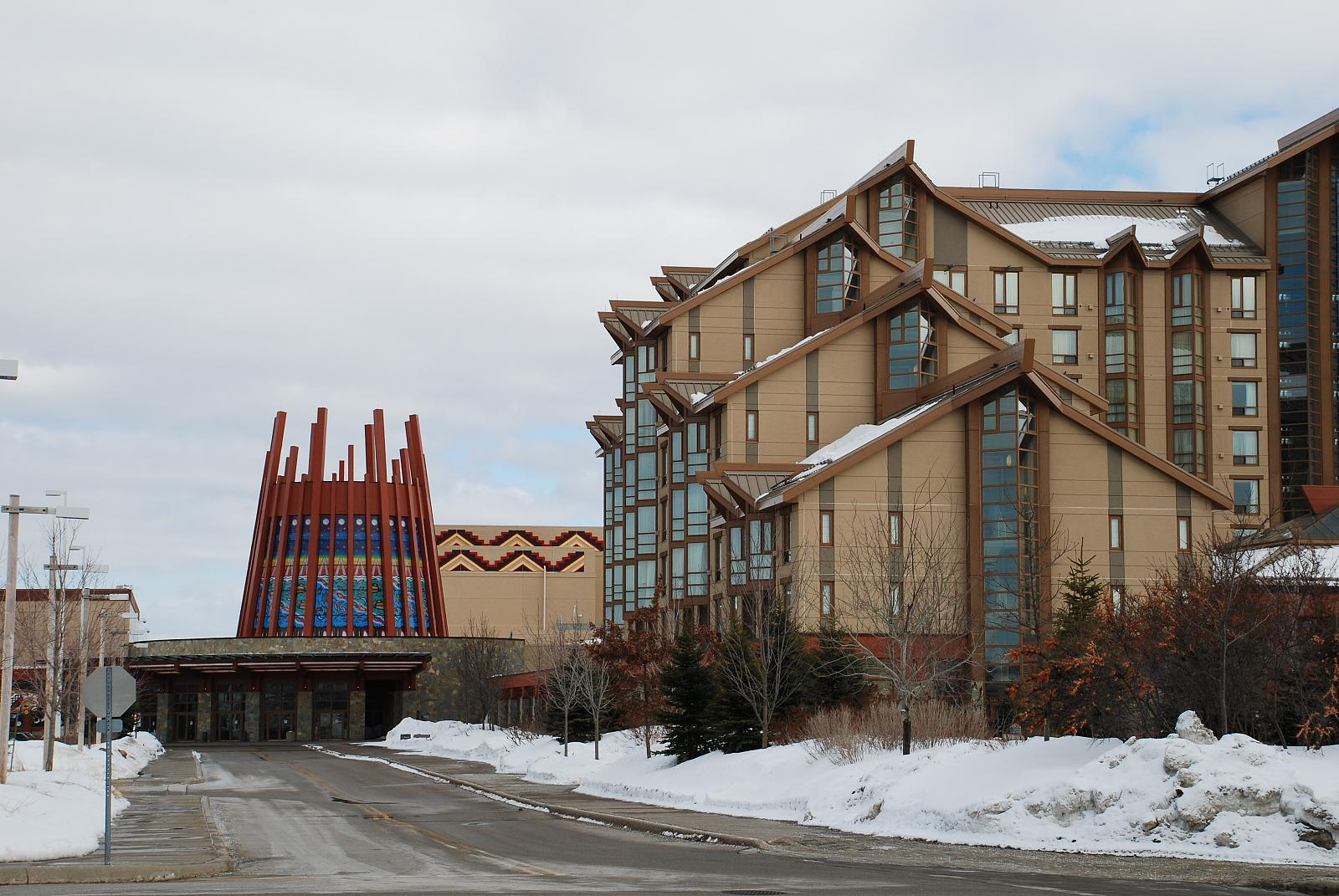
Exterior of the resort's casino and hotel

The resort consists of a 289-room hotel, a casino with a 192,000 sq ft (17,800 m^{2}) floor, the over-5,000-seat Entertainment Centre, and ten restaurants. The casino has 1800 slot machines and 50 table games.

== Events ==
=== Combat sports ===
Casino Rama has hosted a number of live boxing events, titled Rumble at Rama. On April 2, 2011, Casino Rama hosted what was promoted as the first sanctioned mixed martial arts (MMA) event in Ontario, taking place 4 weeks before UFC 129 in Toronto. This was not entirely correct, as an MMA event was held in the Six Nations of the Grand River First Nation 3 years prior, where Dan Severn defeated Ian Asham in the main event; 7 MMA events were staged before the event at Casino Rama. In July 2011, it hosted a Bellator Fighting Championships event.

=== Concerts ===
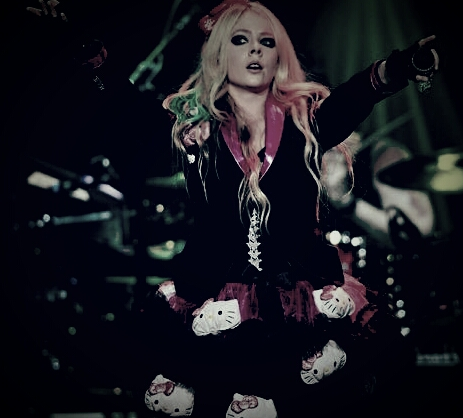
Canadian singer Avril Lavigne performing at Casino Rama in 2014

Over the years, the roughly 5,000-seat Casino Rama Entertainment Centre has hosted a variety of international musicians, with performances by the likes of Tony Bennett, Dolly Parton, Diana Ross, Olivia Newton-John, Gloria Estefan, Lionel Richie, Mariah Carey, Michael Bolton, Ricky Martin, Avril Lavigne, Christina Aguilera, Jewel, Alicia Keys, New Kids on the Block, John Legend, Kelly Clarkson, and many others.

The Irish music ensemble Celtic Thunder filmed two concert specials at the venue; acclaimed Cape Breton Island (Nova Scotia) fiddler Natalie MacMaster has performed at Casino Rama along with her husband, fiddler Donnell Leahy (member of fiddle group Leahy).

Various comedians, such as Jay Leno, Wayne Brady, Jerry Seinfeld, Tom Segura, Howie Mandel, Tim Allen, Larry the Cable Guy, Bill Cosby, and Jeff Foxworthy, have all performed there, as well as magician and illusionist David Copperfield.

Numerous musicians, bands and singer-songwriters, from an array of countries and genres, have performed at Rama:

• Rock—3 Doors Down, Air Supply, Alice Cooper, Bad Company, Big & Rich, Chicago, Creed, Creedence Clearwater Revival, Deep Purple, Extreme, George Thorogood, The Guess Who, Hall & Oates, Heart, Huey Lewis & The News, Journey, Judas Priest, Kiss, Men at Work, Ringo Starr, The Searchers, Steve Miller, Stone Temple Pilots, Styx, Weezer, Whitesnake, ZZ Top.

• Country—Blake Shelton, Brad Paisley, Carrie Underwood, Clint Black, Doc Walker, Faith Hill, Gretchen Wilson, Joe Nichols, Kellie Pickler, LeAnn Rimes, Miranda Lambert, Sugarland, Trace Adkins, Vince Gill, Wynonna Judd.

• Vocalists & songwriters: Art Garfunkel, Eric Burdon, Neil Sedaka, Johnny Mathis, Laura Pausini, Petula Clark, Roger Hodgson, Orietta Berti, Smokey Robinson, Tom Jones, Terra Naomi, Rick Springfield, Donny Osmond, Engelbert Humperdinck, Colin James, Burton Cummings.

Additionally, many Hong Kong–based performers and media personalities of the Cantopop genre have held concerts and other events at Rama, such as:

- Vivian Chow, 2013
- Elisa Chan and Maria Cordero, 2013
- Sandy Lam, 2013
- Raymond Lam, 2012
- Joey Yung, 2012
- Twins, 2011
- Miriam Yeung, 2004 and 2008
- Sammi Cheng, 2000 and 2011

== See also ==
- List of casinos in Canada
- Ontario Lottery and Gaming Corporation
- List of integrated resorts
