= Shorelines Casino Thousand Islands =

Coordinates: 44.34217°N 76.14332°W

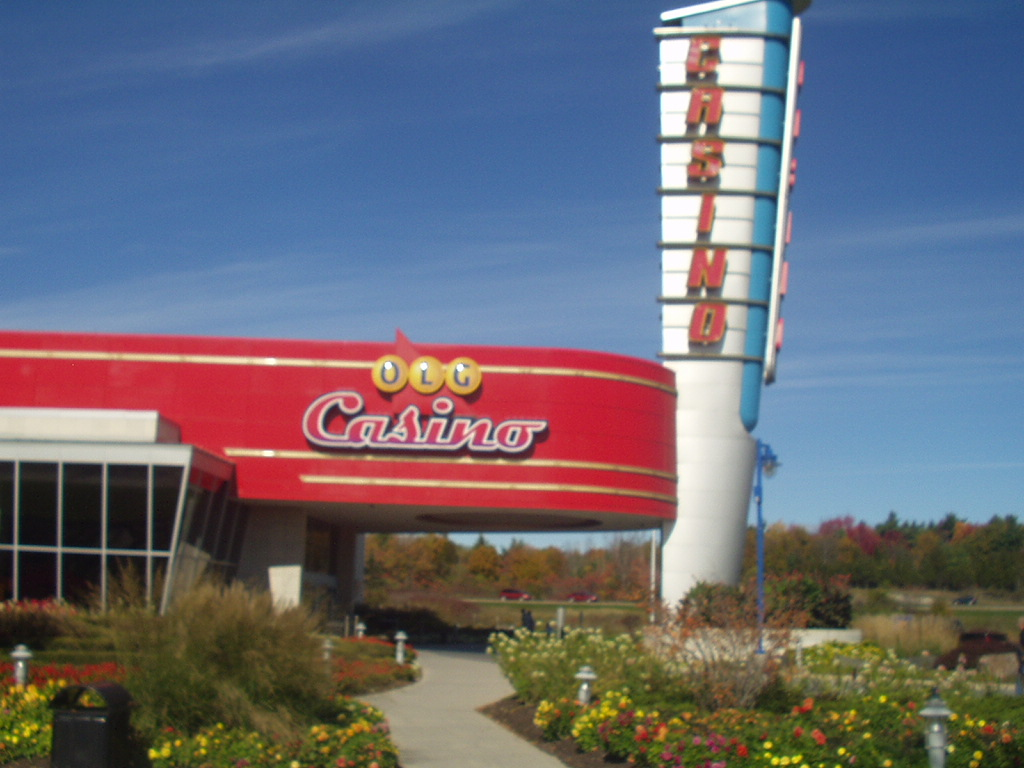
- The casino in the daytime with its former signage
- Interactive map of Shorelines Casino Thousand Islands
- Location: Gananoque, Ontario, Canada; 380 Highway 2 Gananoque, Ontario K7G 2V4
- Opened: June 2002
- Gaming space: 15,000 square feet (1,400 m^{2})
- Permanent shows: None
- Notable restaurants: Getaway Restaurant
- Casino type: Private
- Owner: Great Canadian Entertainment
- Operating license holder: Shoreline Casinos

The Shorelines Casino Thousand Islands, formerly known as the OLG Casino Thousand Islands, the Thousand Islands Charity Casino and the Thousand Islands Casino, is a small casino located in Gananoque, Ontario. It is owned by Great Canadian Entertainment.

The casino was announced in 2000, and opened in June 2002. In 2016, Great Canadian took over operation of the casino.

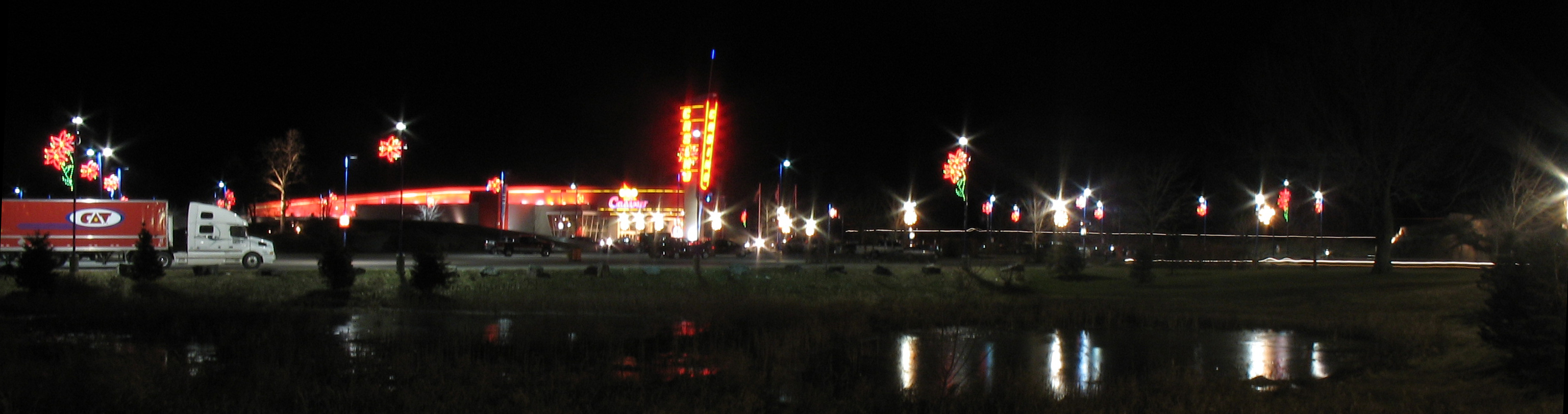
The Thousand Islands Casino at nights with past logo

== See also ==
- List of casinos in Canada
