= List of casinos and horse racing tracks in Alberta =

This is a list of casinos and horse racing tracks in Alberta. The province of Alberta has given out many licences for small casinos but few have attached hotels and none are major resorts. A partial exception to this rule is the River Cree Resort and Casino which is located on the Enoch Cree Indian Reserve and owned by the Enoch Cree Nation (and therefore partially exempt from provincial jurisdiction). In addition to these casinos there are temporary casinos set up during major festivals such as K-Days, large "gaming room" full of VLTs in many bars, and approximately 50 bingo halls throughout the province. The largest casino operator in Alberta is Indigenous Gaming Partners.

== Casinos ==
Several casinos operate in Alberta mainly within the major population centers.

=== Calgary ===
- ACE Casino Airport
- ACE Casino Blackfoot
- Cowboys Casino
- Deerfoot Inn & Casino
- Elbow River Casino
- Pure Casino Calgary

=== Tsuu T'ina First Nation ===
- Grey Eagle Casino & Bingo

=== Camrose ===
- Camrose Resort Casino

=== Cold Lake ===
- Casino Dene

=== Edmonton ===
- Pure Casino Yellowhead
- Pure Casino Edmonton
- Century Casino & Hotel Edmonton
- Grand Villa Casino Edmonton
- Starlight Casino

=== Enoch Cree Nation ===
- River Cree Resort & Casino

=== Fort McMurray ===
- Rivers Casino & Entertainment Centre

=== Grande Prairie ===
- Great Northern Casino

=== Kananaskis ===
- Stoney Nakoda Resort & Casino

=== Lethbridge ===
- Pure Casino Lethbridge

=== Medicine Hat ===
- Copper Coulee Casino - Medicine Hat Lodge

=== Red Deer ===
- Red Deer Resort & Casino
- Cash Casino

=== St. Albert ===
- Century Casino St. Albert

=== Alexis Nakota Sioux Nation ===
- Eagle River Casino and Travel Plaza

== Horse racing tracks ==
Alberta has four racing entertainment centres or (RECs).

=== Balzac ===
- Chinook Downs Racetrack

=== Grande Prairie ===
- Grande Prairie Regional Agricultural & Exhibition Society (Evergreen Park)

=== Leduc County ===
- Northern Mile Racetrack

=== Lethbridge ===
- Rocky Mountain Turf Club (Whoop-Up Downs)
