= Casino New Brunswick =

Canadian casino

Coordinates: 46.1286°N 64.8790°W

- Casino Nouveau-Brunswick (French)
- Interactive map of Casino New Brunswick
- Location: 21 Casino Drive Moncton, New Brunswick E1G 0R7
- Opened: May 4, 2010
- Gaming space: 24,000 square feet (2,200 m^{2})
- Signature attractions: "no info available" The Compass Room
- Notable restaurants: The Hub City Pub; Buffet Restaurant
- Owner: Great Canadian Entertainment
- Website: casinonb.ca

Casino New Brunswick is located in the Magnetic Hill Area of Moncton, New Brunswick, Canada.

== Casino Complex ==
On May 8, 2008, Sonco Gaming New Brunswick Limited Partnership was selected as the successful proponent for the New Brunswick Destination Casino Project. The agreement with the New Brunswick Lotteries and Gaming Corporation (NBLGC) was signed on July 15, 2008, and construction of the complex was underway in October 2008 by Atlantic Canada's Marco Group at a cost of around $90-million. The complex contains a casino, hotel, entertainment center, and dining establishments. The casino opened in 2010.

In May 2015, Sonco Gaming agreed to sell the casino to Great Canadian Gaming for $95 million.

== Incidents ==
On March 4, 2023, a 56-year-old casino manager was assaulted while working and later died in the hospital as a result of his injuries on March 28. The perpetrator, a 50-year-old man, was later charged with manslaughter. The victim's family subsequently sued the perpetrator as well as the parent company of the casino.

== See also ==
- List of casinos in Canada
