= Canad Inns =

Canadian hotel chain

Canad Corporation of Manitoba Ltd.
- Type: Private
- Traded as: Canad Inns
- Industry: Hospitality
- Founded: 1980s in Winnipeg, Manitoba
- Headquarters: Winnipeg, Manitoba
- Number of locations: 11
- Key people: Leo Ledohowski (President and Founder) Ron Ledohowski (Vice President, brother and Co-founder)
- Number of employees: 3,500
- Website: www.canadinns.com

Canad Corporation of Manitoba Ltd. is a Winnipeg-based hospitality company. It owns or operates ten hotels in Canada and one in the United States, with all but one of its properties (a Radisson hotel in downtown Winnipeg) operating under the Canad Inns Destination Centre branding.

Alongside its hotels, it also operates a number of restaurant, tavern, and event venues—most of which co-located as part of Canad Inns locations.

== Company overview ==
Canad Inns operates a total of 10 properties in the province and one in the US. Canad Inns also operates restaurants, pubs, night clubs, water parks, and first class banquet and conference facilities within its hotel complexes, which are branded as "destination centres."

Several of Canad Inns destination centres are located adjacent to larger venues. Canad Inns Brandon is located adjacent to the Keystone Centre, one location is attached to Winnipeg's Club Regent Casino, while the Grand Forks, North Dakota location is connected to the Alerus Center. In 2013, Canad Inns opened a $40 million location at Winnipeg's Health Sciences Centre.

The company also owns the historic Metropolitan Theatre building in downtown Winnipeg and has converted it into a multi-purpose entertainment and banquet facility.

The chain employs more than 3,500 people and is the 14th largest hotel chain in Canada and the largest in Manitoba.

In 2000, Canad Inns was named one of "Canada's 50 Best Managed Companies." In 2009 and 2010, Canad Inns was named one of Manitoba's Top 25 Employers as published by the Winnipeg Free Press.

== Sponsorships ==
In 2001, the company purchased the naming rights to Winnipeg Stadium, home of the Winnipeg Blue Bombers of the Canadian Football League, after which the stadium became known as Canad Inns Stadium. The stadium was demolished in 2013.

== Litigation ==
In 2007, Lake Louise Limited Partnership filed suit alleging that Canad inflated management fees owed to it for operating Club Regent Casino Hotel and Canad Inns Brandon by including every dollar deposited in video lottery terminals (VLTs) as gross revenue.

In November 2014, the receiver for the failed Crocus Investment Fund petitioned a court to dissolve and liquidate the parent company of Canad Inns, alleging Canad Corporation assets to have been wrongfully diverted for company president Leo Ledohowski's benefit. In November 2019, the court-appointed receiver Deloitte reached an agreement to resolve the lawsuit, under which Canad agreed to pay $4 million—accounting for most of the fund's original investment.

In December 2014, the company was also sued by former chief operating officer Antonio Ventresca and his wife for wrongful dismissal, alleging that Ledohowski sexually harassed her while the pair were working for the company, and that it "engaged in a course of reprisal" after she refused Ledohowski's advances over a year-long period—leading to their firing.

A lawsuit against Leo Ledohowski, Canad Inns Group and Fillmore Riley LLP was filed by Leo's brother, former Vice President, working partner and Co-founder commenced in June 2021 and remains active.

https://web43.gov.mb.ca/Registry/FileNumberSearch/SearchResults?FileNumber=CI21-01-31687

== Properties ==
=== Hotels ===
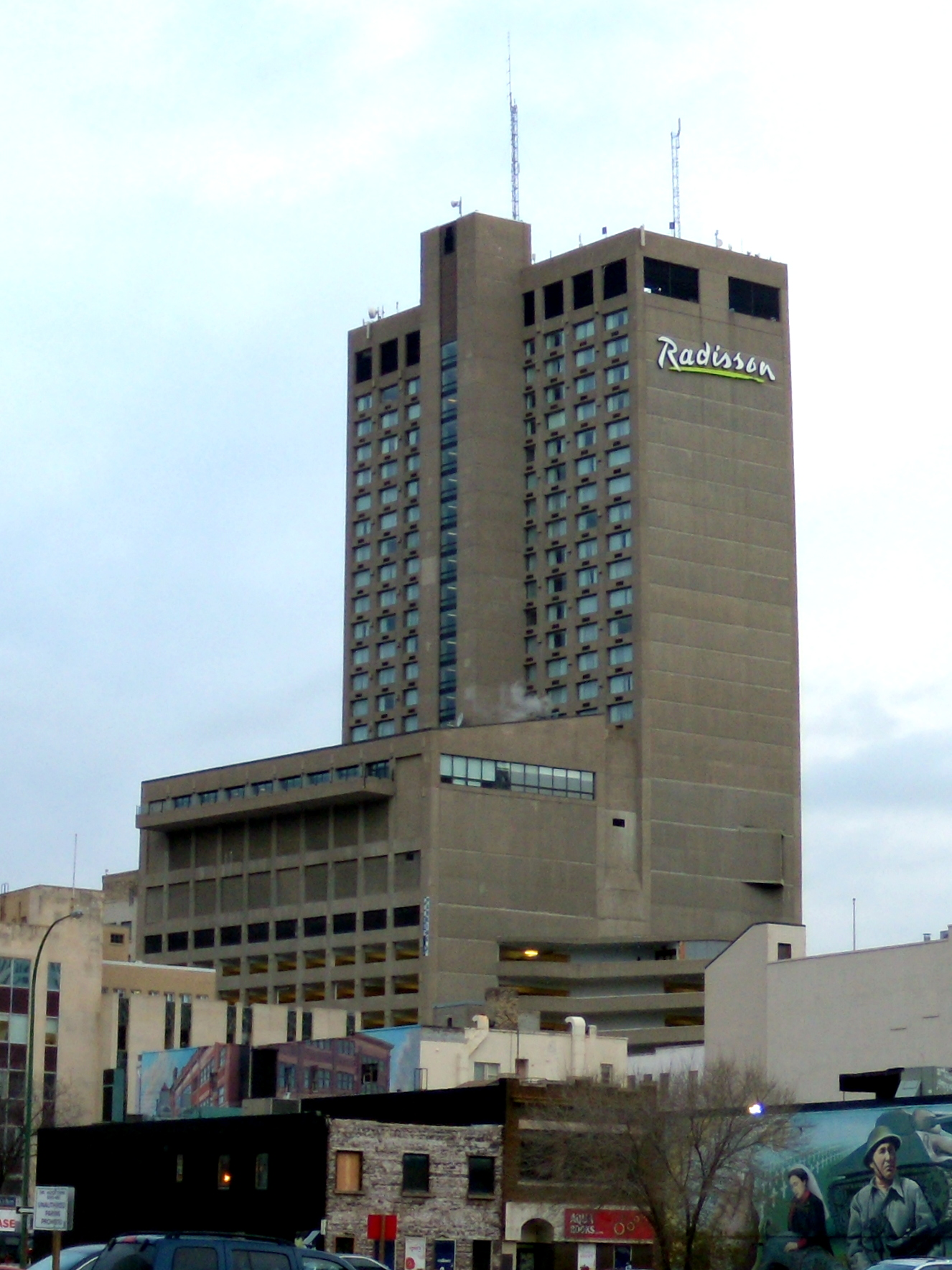
The Radisson Hotel Winnipeg Downtown

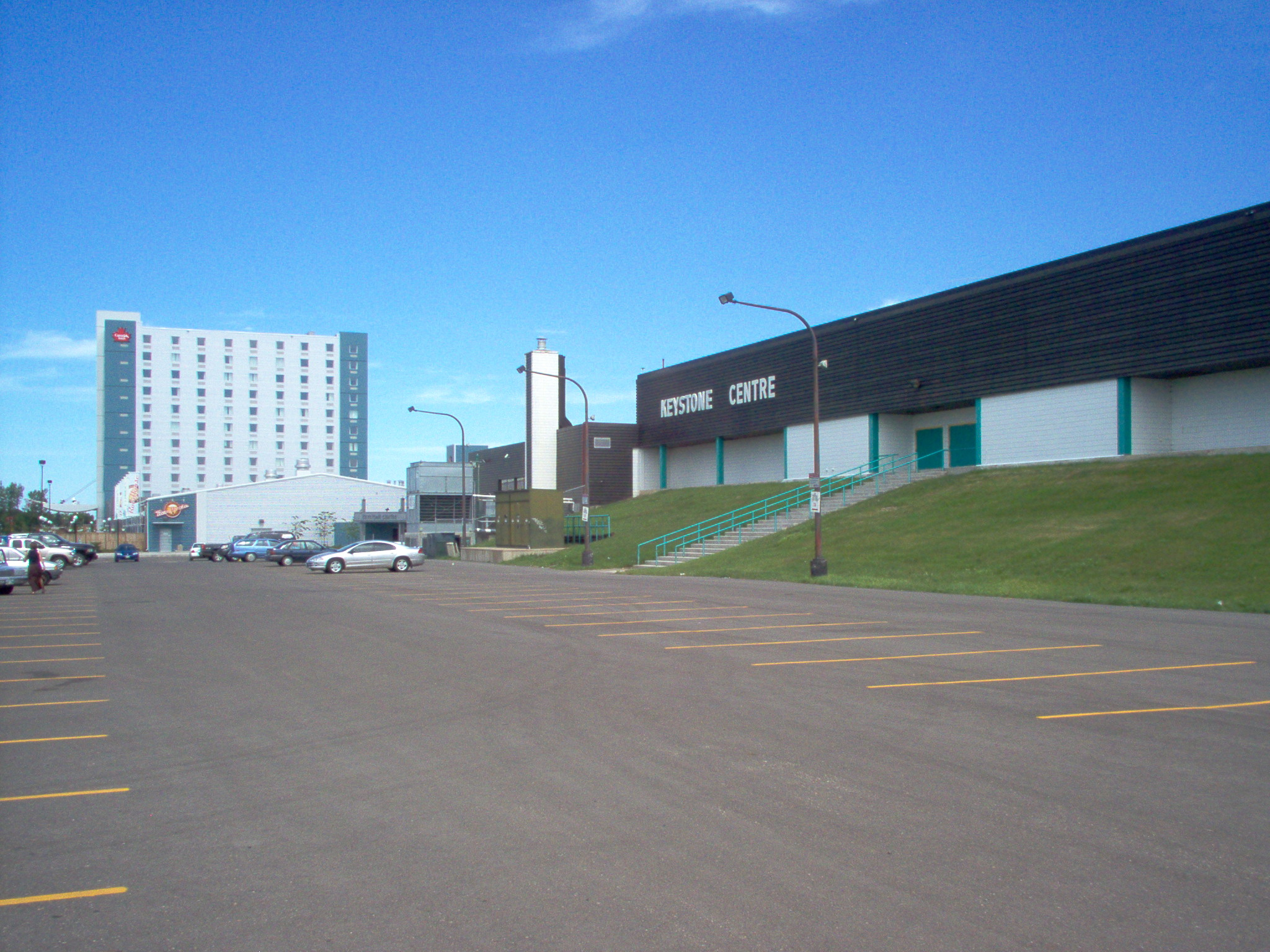
The Keystone Centre in Brandon, Manitoba with a Canad Inns hotel tower in the background

- Winnipeg, Manitoba
  - Club Regent Casino Hotel
  - Radisson Hotel Winnipeg Downtown
  - Polo Park
  - Windsor Park
  - Transcona
  - Garden City
  - Fort Garry
  - Express Fort Garry (Sold in 2018)
  - Health Sciences Centre
- Portage la Prairie, Manitoba
- Brandon, Manitoba (Keystone Centre)
- Grand Forks, North Dakota (Alerus Center)

=== Other ventures ===
- Food and Beverage
  - Aaltos – buffet restaurants at Canad Inns hotels.
  - Tavern United – sports bars at Canad Inns hotels. Also included one standalone downtown Winnipeg location on Graham Avenue in the Powerhouse Building, which closed in July 2026.
  - 'l Bistro
  - Garbonzo's Pizza & Arcade
  - Garbonzo's Sports Pub
  - Resto 12 – restaurant located at the Radisson Winnipeg.
  - 2 Starbucks locations
- Entertainment
  - Splasher's Indoor Water Park – indoor pools located at Canad Inns hotels.
  - Playmaker's—video lottery terminal (VLT) parlors at Canad Inns hotels.
  - Metropolitan Entertainment Centre
- Event centres
  - Essence Event Center
  - Nashville's
  - Cowboys
  - TYC Event Center
  - Reign Nightclub (closed/demolished in 2018)
  - The Great Western Roadhouse
- Ambassador Banquet & Conference Centre
