= Gateway Casinos =

Canadian gaming and entertainment operator

Gateway Casinos & Entertainment Limited
- Company type: Private
- Industry: Gaming
- Founded: 1992; 34 years ago
- Headquarters: Burnaby, British Columbia
- Products: Entertainment, Gambling, Food and Beverage, Hotel
- Revenue: Over $200.0 million
- Number of employees: 7,000
- Website: gatewaycasinos.com

Gateway Casinos and Entertainment is a Canadian gaming and entertainment operator. It operates 31 casinos in British Columbia, Alberta, and Ontario. The corporate offices of Gateway Casinos and Entertainment are located in Burnaby, British Columbia. It is owned by The Catalyst Capital Group Inc., a private equity investment firm founded in 2002.

== History ==
Gateway Casinos & Entertainment Limited is one of the largest casino and entertainment companies in Canada and has grown from 2 facilities with 150 employees to 31 facilities with over 7,000 employees.

Starting in 1992, Gateway Casinos has provided operational services for casinos in the Greater Vancouver Regional District of British Columbia. In April 1992, Gateway Casinos acquired two casino operations in the Vancouver area: a 5,000 square foot facility on the second floor of the Mandarin Centre in Vancouver’s Chinatown and a smaller 4,000 square foot operation on the top floor of the Royal Towers Hotel in New Westminster, BC.

In March 1994, Gateway Casinos purchased a third casino, located in Maple Ridge, British Columbia with the intention of relocation in the future, which ultimately became Gateway’s Burnaby Casino.

June 1994 saw the Gateway relocation of the Vancouver casino from the small premises on the second floor of the Mandarin Centre to newly renovated premises in the same building. At this time, Mandarin Centre was the largest casino in British Columbia. In January 1996, Gateway Casinos relocated its operation in New Westminster from the top floor to expanded premises within the hotel.

Gateway Casinos ceased operating the casino in Maple Ridge in November 1996. The new operation was opened on the second floor of the parkade across from the now Grand Villa Casino in Burnaby, British Columbia.

November 1999 saw the Gateway acquisition of the Palace Casino (now Starlight Casino) in Edmonton, Alberta where an extensive renovation which more than doubled the size of the facility, was substantially completed in October 2001.

The year 2002 was pivotal for Gateway due to the acquisition of the Baccarat Casino in Edmonton, Alberta, in June and the August purchase of the Lake City Casinos in Penticton, Kelowna, Kamloops and Vernon.

In May 2005 Gateway Casinos opened the Cascades Casino in the heart of Langley, British Columbia which brought about a new era of gaming for the company, boasting over 60,000 square feet of gaming space, 77-room hotel and more than 25,000 square feet of convention space operated by Coast Hotels & Resorts Limited.

The Starlight Casino and Grand Villa Casino were opened in 2007 and 2008 respectively and are currently operating as Gateway Casinos & Entertainment Limited’s flagship properties. In 2011 Gateway Casinos & Entertainment Limited purchased three existing Community Gaming Centres located in Squamish, Mission and the Newton Surrey area. In April 2015 Gateway Casinos & Entertainment revealed its plans to build brand new casino located in the Edmonton Arena District.

In December 2015 Gateway casinos bought Playtime Gaming Inc. expanding their properties with 4 new CGC (community gaming centers) and 2 commercial bingo halls making them the largest casino company in British Columbia.

In December 2016, Gateway casinos purchased 11 Casinos from OLG in Ontario ranging from Thunder Bay to London with rights to build in Kenora and North Bay hereby now employing 6000+ people and making its way into the Ontario market.

In March 2018, Gateway was selected as the service provider for OLG's Central Gaming Bundle, which includes management of Casino Rama and slot operations at Georgian Downs, and the rights to build a new casino in Collingwood or Wasaga Beach. Wasaga Beach was selected as the site of the proposed new casino in April 2019.

At the beginning of 2019 Gateway acquired Chances Casino Kamloops. The acquisition made Gateway the sole gaming provider in Kamloops, as the operator of both Cascades Casino Kamloops and Chances Kamloops. In the spring, Gateway followed with the acquisition of Chances Signal Point in Williams Lake. This allowed Gateway to expand its footprint into the Cariboo region of the Central Interior of British Columbia. Also in 2019, Gateway launched its Playtime Casino brand in Ontario with the transformed Playtime Casino Hanover opening its doors on April 11th.

On July 21, 2021, Gateway announced the expansion of its food and beverage operations. It now includes mobile restaurant service with the launch of two “Match on the Move” food trucks – one operating in the Lower Mainland and one operating in Southwestern Ontario. The vision for “Match on the Move” is to bring the Match brand of pub tastes to the streets of the communities they operate with the familiarity of the bricks & mortar experience.

In 2022, Gateway celebrated the official opening of two new Cascades Casino branded locations. The first on April 21 in North Bay, Ontario and the second on September 29 in Delta, BC. the addition of these two locations represents an investment of million into each community as well as the creation of hundreds of new jobs.

Wasaga Playtime Casino opened on November 23, 2022. The casino represents a $34.3 million investment in the community of Wasaga Beach and has created 140 new jobs.

=== 2023 Cyberattack ===
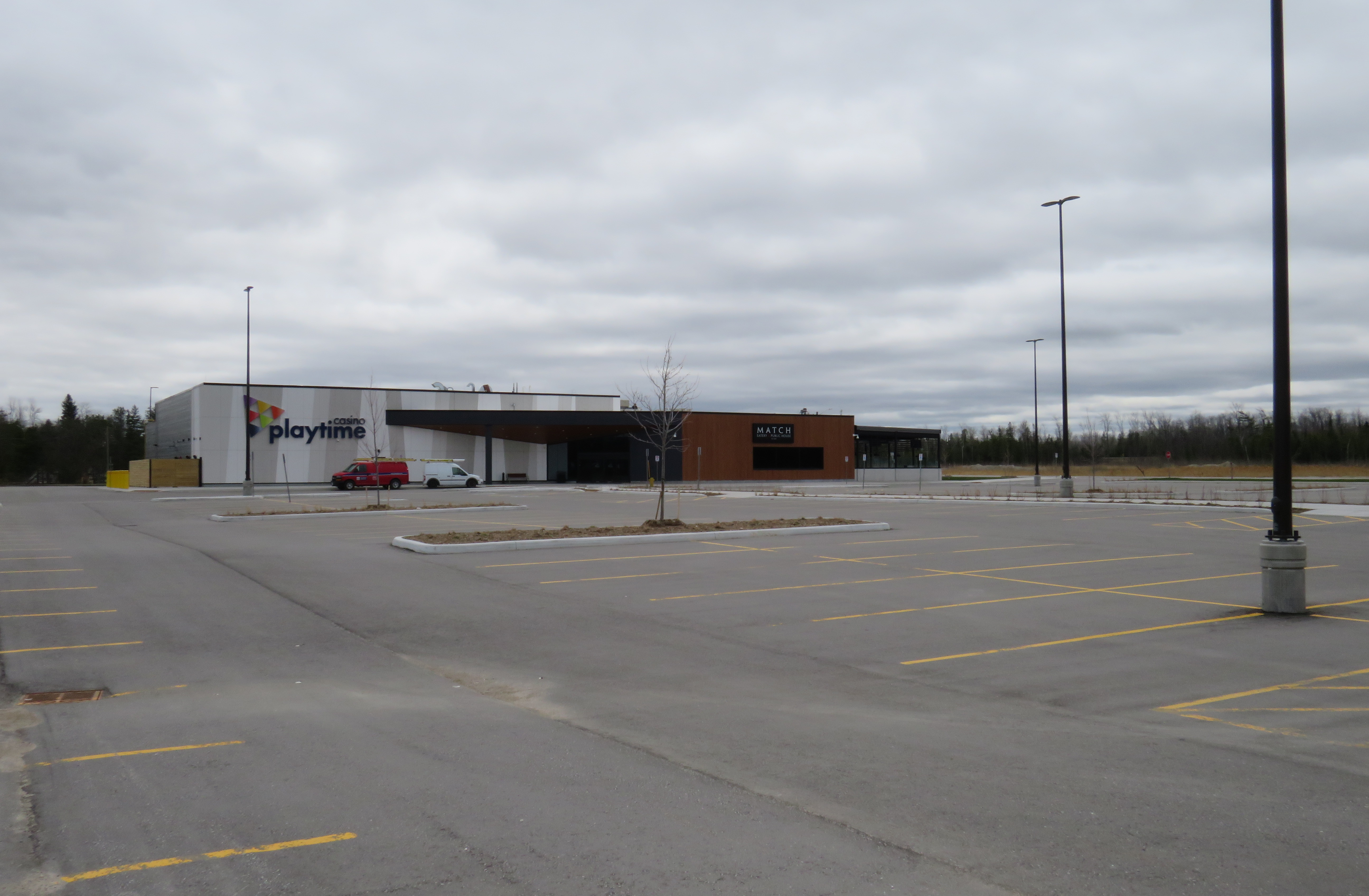
Playtime Casino Wasaga in Wasaga Beach, Ontario closed during the 2023 cyberattack, with repair crews on site

On April 16, 2023, the company was the victim of a cyberattack, which resulted in the closure of its casinos and most of their associated restaurants and other facilities in Ontario. As of May 2, casinos were being re-opened.
