= Ajax Downs =

Horse racing track in Ontario, Canada

Coordinates: 43.87089°N 79.00285°W

Ajax Downs is a Quarter Horse race track located in Ajax, Ontario, a suburb east of Toronto, Ontario, Canada. Opened in 1969 as "Picov Downs" the name was changed in 2006 with the establishment of a new slot-machine gaming facility. The slots facility is known as Casino Ajax. A full 6 furlongs (1.2 km) oval racetrack was completed in 2009. Racing is held at the track from May through October.

== History ==
The founder of Ajax Downs, Alex Picov, came from Ukraine in 1921 and is widely credited for establishing Quarter Horse racing in Ontario. The Picovs built Picov Downs, which opened in 1969, on their family farm. The track was known as the "J" Track. The track was renamed in 2006 to Ajax Downs with the creation of the new slots facility. A six-furlong oval racetrack was completed in 2009.

Ajax Downs is home to many stakes races, including qualifying events for the AQHA Bank of America Racing Challenge program. The Alex Picov Memorial is run yearly at Ajax Downs. It is the richest Quarter horse race in Canada.
