= Great Canadian Entertainment =

Canadian gaming company

- Formerly: Great Canadian Gaming Corporation
- Type: Private
- Industry: Gaming and hospitality
- Founded: 1982
- Headquarters: North York, Toronto, Ontario, Canada
- Number of employees: 9,400 (2018)
- Parent: Apollo Global Management
- Website: greatcanadian.com

Great Canadian Entertainment is a Canadian gaming, entertainment and hospitality company. Prior to its acquisition by Apollo Global Management in September 2021, the company was listed on the Toronto Stock Exchange and was part of the S&P/TSX Composite Index.

== Overview ==
Great Canadian operates gaming properties in Canada, consisting of casinos, horse race tracks (with slot machines), and smaller-scale gaming centres. It also runs hotels, restaurants, and entertainment facilities associated with its properties. As of the third quarter of 2017, 67% of revenue was from gaming. As of 2018, it had 9,400 employees. In 2016, 61% of revenues were from British Columbia, 17% were from Ontario, 15% were from Atlantic Canada, and the rest were from the United States. In total, Great Canadian properties include 16,000 slot machines, 386 table games, 80 dining establishments and 500 hotel rooms.

In 2017, the company's gross gaming revenue was about $1.2 billion, with net earnings for 2017 of $85.7 million.

== History ==
The company was founded in 1982 as the Great Canadian Casino Company. It initially operated charity casinos and a casino at Vancouver's Pacific National Exhibition. In 1986, it opened its first permanent casino in Vancouver. It held an IPO on the TSX Venture Exchange in 1992, and renamed itself the Great Canadian Gaming Company in 1997. In 2004, it listed on the Toronto Stock Exchange. In 2005, it acquired a number of casinos in Ontario and Nova Scotia. As a result of these acquisitions, it breached debt agreements in March 2006.

Great Canadian has been investigated for money laundering that allegedly took place at their River Rock Casino Resort. The company has released a statement saying that it has followed all the necessary procedures.

In August 2017, Great Canadian (in cooperation with Brookfield Property Partners) won a bidding process to take over the slots facility at Woodbine Racetrack in Toronto from the OLG. It also took over the slots at the Ajax Downs track and the Great Blue Heron Casino. The then-opposition Ontario PCs called for the deal to be halted due to the money laundering allegations.

In December 2017, Great Canadian (in cooperation with Clairvest Group) won a process to take over four more OLG facilities.

In January 2021, president and CEO Rodney Baker resigned after he and his wife were discovered to have booked a private plane to travel to Beaver Creek, Yukon and deceived medical personnel by saying they were local motel workers to obtain doses of a COVID-19 vaccine intended for the indigenous community.

In September 2021, the company was acquired by Apollo Global Management in an all-cash deal and its shares were delisted from the Toronto Stock Exchange.

In 2024, Great Canadian began to pull out of the British Columbia market, having sold almost all of its casinos (aside from Chances Dawson Creek) to local First Nations communities.

== Properties ==
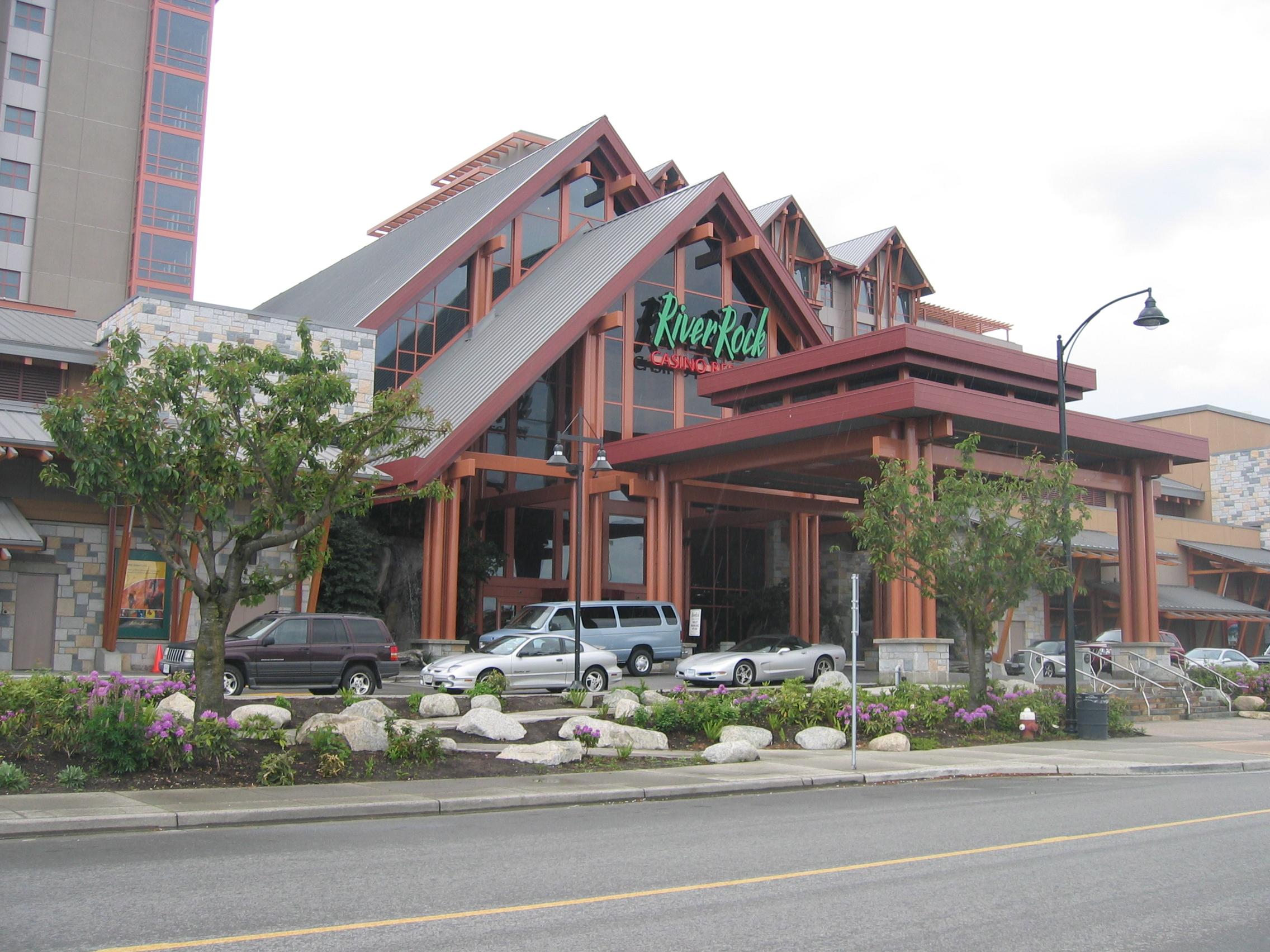
River Rock Casino Resort in Richmond, British Columbia

=== British Columbia ===
- River Rock Casino Resort in Richmond, the largest casino in British Columbia. The property also includes a theatre and two hotels. This casino was opened in 2004, replacing a previous casino on the site.
- Great Canadian Casino Vancouver in Coquitlam, which also includes a theatre. The casino originally opened as Boulevard Casino in 2001, and re-branded itself in 2013.
- Hastings Racecourse in Vancouver, which also includes 600 slot machines. The company acquired the race track's operations in 2004.
- Elements Casino Surrey in Surrey
- Elements Casino Chilliwack in Chilliwack
- Chances Maple Ridge in Maple Ridge
- Chances Dawson Creek in Dawson Creek

=== Ontario ===
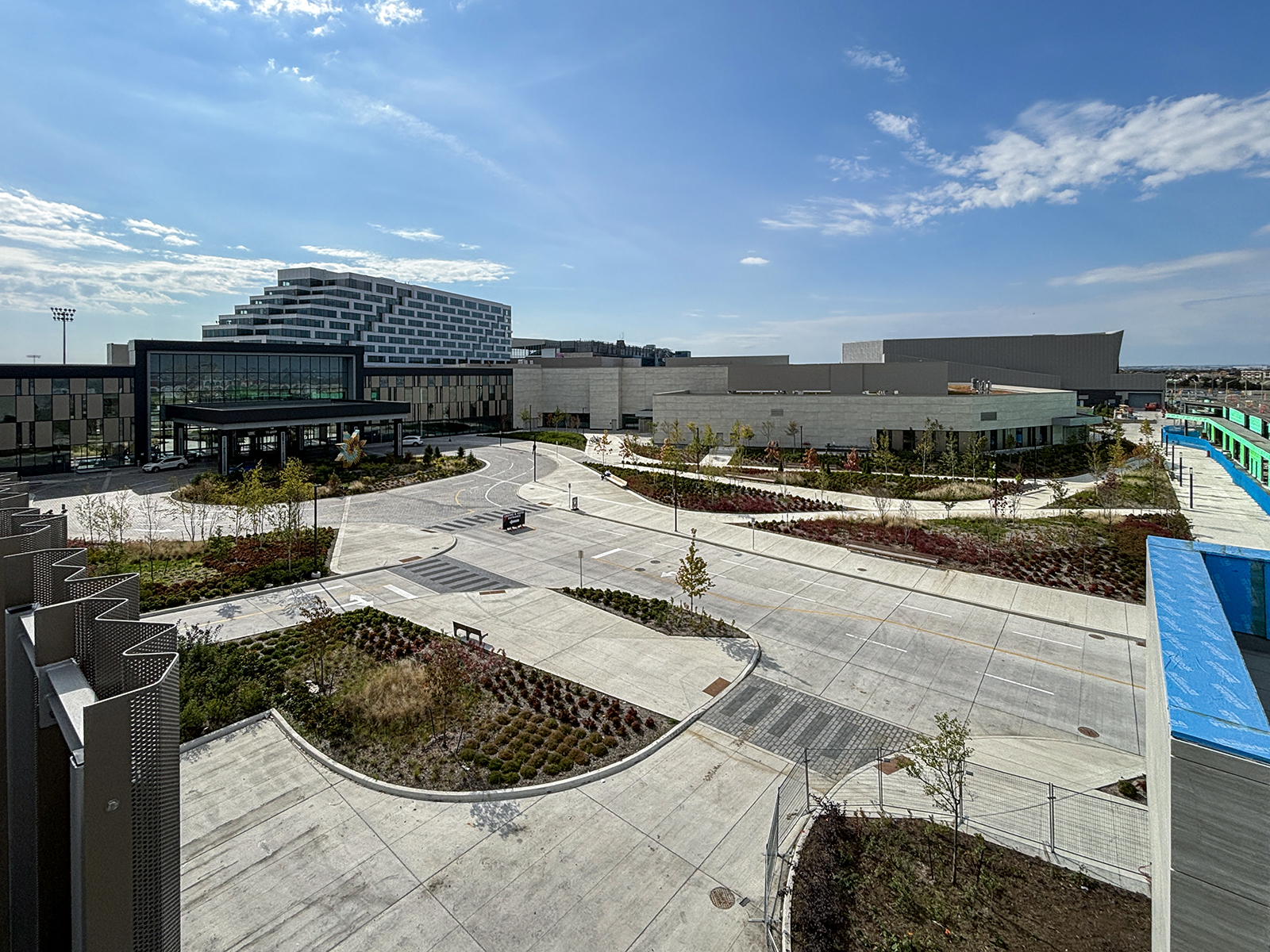
Great Canadian Casino Resort Toronto opened in 2023

- Casino Ajax at Ajax Downs in Ajax
- Great Canadian Casino Resort Toronto at Woodbine Racetrack in Toronto
- Great Blue Heron Casino on Scugog Island First Nation
- Pickering Casino Resort in Pickering
- Shorelines Casino Thousand Islands in Gananoque
- Shorelines Slots at Kawartha Downs, a race track in Fraserville, south of Peterborough. This track has been reopened in spring 2019 with only 150 slots and racetrack since the opening of the new 75,000 ft^{2} (7,000 m^{2}) Shorelines Casino in Peterborough.
- Shorelines Casino Belleville in Belleville. This casino opened on January 11, 2017, and was the first new casino in Ontario since 2006.
- Shorelines Casino Peterborough in Peterborough, opened in 2018
- Georgian Downs, a race track in Innisfil, acquired in 2005
- Elements Casino Flamboro at Flamboro Downs, a race track in Hamilton, acquired in 2005
- Elements Casino Brantford, formerly OLG Casino Brantford, acquired in 2018
- Elements Casino Grand River at Grand River Raceway, formerly OLG Slots Grand River
- Elements Casino Mohawk at Mohawk Racetrack, former OLG Slots Mohawk

=== Atlantic Canada ===
- Casino Nova Scotia Halifax, acquired in 2005
- Casino Nova Scotia Sydney, acquired in 2005
- Casino New Brunswick in Moncton, acquired in 2015
