= Indigenous Gaming Partners =

Industry organisation in Nova Scotia

- Type: Private
- Industry: Gaming and hospitality
- Founded: 2024
- Headquarters: Edmonton, Alberta, Canada
- Key people: Michael Peters (Chairperson)
- Number of employees: 1,800 (2026)
- Website: indigenousgamingpartners.ca

Indigenous Gaming Partners (IGP) is a Native American gaming operator in Canada. Owned by a consortium of five Mi'kmaq groups in Nova Scotia (the Glooscap First Nation, Annapolis Valley First Nation, Millbrook First Nation, We'koqma'q First Nation, and Paqꞌtnkek First Nation) in partnership with Sonco Gaming, the company primarily owns casinos in the province of Alberta.

It was first established in 2024 via their acquisition of Edmonton-based Pure Canadian Gaming and its four properties. In 2026 it acquired three more casinos and three hotels by taking publicly traded Gamehost, private.

== History ==
IGP was founded in 2024 as a partnership between the Glooscap First Nation, Annapolis Valley First Nation, Millbrook First Nation, We'koqma'q First Nation, and Paqꞌtnkek First Nation in Nova Scotia, and Indigenous casino management company Sonco Gaming. That year, the company acquired Edmonton-based Pure Canadian Gaming from ONCAP, giving it ownership of its four casinos in Calgary, Edmonton, and Lethbridge, Alberta. The company acquired the leases to the properties, which are owned by Vici Properties.

In March 2026, via its subsidiary Pure Casino Entertainment, IGP announced its intent to acquire Gamehost Inc. and its casino and hotel properties, including Calgary's Deerfoot Inn & Casino, Rivers Casino and Entertainment Centre in Fort McMurray, and Great Northern Casino in Grand Prairie. As part of the acquisition, the casinos' properties will all be sold to Vici Properties in a sale-and-leaseback agreement. In June 2026 IGP announced it completed the acquisition of Gamehost and now operates seven casinos in Alberta.

In 2026 it applied to operate an iGaming, online casino called Pure Casino.

== Governance ==
IGP is governed by a board of directors, which includes representatives from each of the five First Nations. The current chairperson of IGP is Michael Peters of Glooscap . Leadership decisions are made collaboratively, with input from all member communities.

Sonco Gaming Inc manages the casinos on behalf of the partners.

== Properties ==
IGP currently owns seven casinos and three hotels in Alberta via its subsidiary Pure Casino Entertainment.

- Pure Casino Calgary
- Pure Casino Edmonton
- Pure Casino Yellowhead
- Pure Casino Lethbridge
- Deerfoot Inn & Casino
- Rivers Casino & Entertainment Centre
- Great Northern Casino
- Service Plus Inn & Suites
- Encoure Suites Grand Prairie
