= Red Robinson =

Canadian radio host (1937–2023)

Red Robinson OBC
- Born: Robert Robinson; March 30, 1937; Comox, British Columbia, Canada
- Died: April 1, 2023 (aged 86)
- Occupation: Radio/television personality
- Years active: 1953–2023
- Website: www.redrobinson.com

Robert "Red" Robinson OBC (March 30, 1937 – April 1, 2023) was a Canadian disc jockey. He was the first disc jockey to play rock and roll music in Vancouver, British Columbia.

Robinson died on April 1, 2023, at the age of 86.

== Honours ==
- In July 2016, Robinson was appointed to the Order Of British Columbia, the highest form of recognition by the BC government.
