= Club Regent Casino =

Casino in Winnipeg, Manitoba, Canada

Coordinates: 49.8950°N 97.0283°W

- Interactive map of Club Regent Casino
- Location: 1425 Regent Ave W, Winnipeg, MB
- Opened: 1993
- Notable restaurants: McDonald's
- Owner: Manitoba Liquor & Lotteries

Club Regent Casino is a casino located in Winnipeg, Manitoba. It is one of two casinos in the city—the other being the McPhillips Street Station Casino—both of which are owned and operated by the Manitoba Liquor & Lotteries Corporation, and thus the Government of Manitoba.

Connected to the casino is the Canad Inns Club Regent Hotel, as well as the Club Regent Event Centre, which opened in 2014.

Club Regent is located in the Winnipeg neighborhood of Transcona on Regent Avenue, and is 15 km (25-minute drive) from the Winnipeg International Airport. The casino opened in 1993, after an assessment regarding the distribution of gambling revenue was released.

The casino contains a McDonald's restaurant, as well as a concert stage, on which regular comedy, and musical performances are scheduled.

== Casino ==
Club Regent has approximately 1,200 slot machines.

The gaming area of the casino is divided into two main areas, which are connected via a decommissioned aquarium tunnel that used to contain exotic saltwater fish. The first area (which is entered from the south or east entrance), contains a large amount of VLT and slot machines. The second area contains another section of VLTs, slot machines, and a table game area, which includes such games as Blackjack, Red Dog, Texas Hold'em Bonus Poker, Roulette, Baccarat, Pai gow poker, and Let it ride. Three card poker was offered until early 2009, when it was replaced with Red Dog. Next to the table games is a large poker area, which contains multiple 10-seat poker tables.

In this second area of the casino, there is a large bamboo-styled spiral staircase, which leads downstairs. Prior to 2007, the poker area was located downstairs; while the poker area was downstairs, the Manitoba Gaming Control Commission only allowed the casino to run Fixed-Limit poker games. Shortly after its move upstairs, the Commission approved the casino to run No-Limit poker games. Currently, the poker area runs $1/$2 No-limit Texas hold 'em games, but higher limits are available upon player request. Aside from the cash poker games facilitated, the casino also runs regular Poker Tournaments.

== Hotel ==
The Club Regent Casino Hotel is owned and operated by Canad Inns, a Winnipeg hotel chain. The hotel contains 146 guest rooms, as well as a fitness centre. The hotel has a 3-diamond rating from AAA/CAA, and a 4-star rating from Canada Select. The hotel also has a 3-Green Key rating from the Hotel Association of Canada's Green Key Eco-Rating Program.

== See also ==
- List of casinos in Canada
- List of casinos
