= McPhillips Station Casino =

Casino in Winnipeg, Manitoba, Canada

- Interactive map of McPhillips Station Casino
- Location: 484 McPhillips St, Winnipeg, MB; 49.9197°N 97.1712°W
- Opened: 1993
- Notable restaurants: McDonald's
- Owner: Manitoba Liquor & Lotteries

McPhillips Station Casino (formerly the McPhillips Street Station Casino) is a casino located in Winnipeg, Manitoba. It is one of two casinos in the city (the other being the Club Regent Casino), both are owned and operated by the Manitoba Liquor & Lotteries Corporation, and in turn, the Government of Manitoba.

The casino opened in 1993, after an assessment regarding the distribution of gambling revenue was released.

In December 2015 the casino announced a $45-million renovation plan.

== See also ==
- List of casinos in Canada
- List of casinos
