= Tropicana =

Tropicana may refer to:

== Companies ==
- Tropicana Entertainment, a former casino company that owned several Tropicana-branded casinos
- Tropicana Products, a Chicago-based food company known for orange juice

== Hotels and nightclubs ==
- Tropicana Casino & Resort Atlantic City, Atlantic City, New Jersey
- Tropicana Club, a nightclub in Havana, Cuba
- Tropicana Evansville, now Bally's Evansville, a casino hotel in Evansville, Indiana
- Tropicana Laughlin, a casino hotel in Laughlin, Nevada
- Tropicana Las Vegas, a demolished former casino hotel on the Las Vegas Strip

== Music ==
- "Tropicana", a 1983 song by Gruppo Italiano
- "Tropicana", a song by Moka Only and Chief from the album Crickets, 2011
- "Tropicana" (Boomdabash and Annalisa song), 2022
- "Tropicana" (RAF Camora and HoodBlaq song), 2023

== Places ==
- Tropicana, Weston-super-Mare, a now-derelict outdoor swimming pool in Somerset, England
- Tropicana Avenue, a street in Las Vegas, Nevada
- Tropicana Field, a baseball stadium in St. Petersburg, Florida
- Tropicana Gold Mine, a major gold mine in Western Australia
- Tropicana LRT station, a transit station in Malaysia
- Tropicana Aman, a township in Malaysia

== Sports ==
- Tropicana 400, a NASCAR race, now known as the Camping World 400
- Tropicana Twister 300, a NASCAR race, now known as the Chicagoland 300

== Other uses ==
- Tropicana Short Film Festival, former name of Tropfest, held in Sydney, Australia

== See also ==
- "Club Tropicana", a song by Wham! from their album Fantastic
