= Casino Aztar =

Casino Aztar may refer to either of two casinos originally opened by the Aztar Corporation:

- Casino Aztar Caruthersville, now Century Casino Caruthersville — Caruthersville, Missouri
- Casino Aztar Evansville, now Bally's Evansville — Evansville, Indiana
