= Aztar =

Former hospitality company

Aztar Corporation
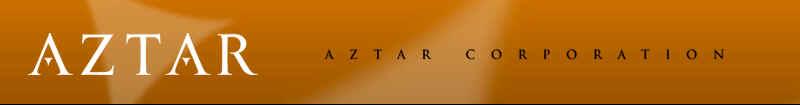
- Industry: Gaming and Hospitality
- Predecessor: Ramada Inn, Inc.
- Founded: 1989; 37 years ago
- Defunct: January 4, 2007; 19 years ago
- Fate: Acquired by Columbia Sussex
- Headquarters: Phoenix, Arizona, U.S.

Aztar Corporation was a hospitality company based in Phoenix, Arizona, focused on resort hotels and casinos. In 2005, the company had revenues of more than $915 million and earnings before interest and taxes of $212 million. During 2006 the company became the subject of a bidding war for ownership, with Columbia Sussex winning.

== History ==
Aztar was formed in 1989 as part of a restructuring of Ramada Inn, Inc. Ramada's gaming businesses, including the Tropicana Atlantic City and the Tropicana Las Vegas, were spun off as Aztar Corporation, which was given to Ramada's shareholders, while Ramada's restaurant and non-gaming hotel businesses remained with the original company, which was immediately acquired by Hong Kong-based New World Development. Aztar took its name as a portmanteau of "Aztec" and "star".

In 1995, the new Aztar Corporation expanded its operations to include riverboat casinos in Caruthersville, Missouri and Evansville, Indiana. On March 5, 2002 Aztar acquired full ownership of the 34-acre (140,000 m^{2}) Tropicana location in Las Vegas by purchasing the 50% share held by Chicago's Jaffe family. During 2005, the company acquired a site in Allentown, Pennsylvania with the intention of securing a gaming license and then developing a casino.

On March 13, 2006, Aztar announced plans to be acquired by Pinnacle Entertainment for $2.1 billion. Subsequent bids were made by Colony Capital, LLC, Columbia Sussex and Ameristar Casinos. As of April 26, 2006, all four companies were engaged in bidding over Aztar, with Pinnacle increased its bid to $45 per share, matching Ameristar's bid; Columbia Sussex had previously bid $47 per share. Later, Columbia Sussex increased its bid to $50 a share, all in cash. Aztar management determined on May 1 that the latest bid was preferred over Pinnacle's late increase to $48 a share, in cash and stock.

On May 4, 2006, Ameristar announced that it was pulling out of the bidding for Aztar. Additionally, Colony apparently lost interest, having failed to increase its bid beyond $41 a share and making no public comment for several weeks. Since Columbia Sussex eventually outbid Pinnacle, the latter company was paid a $50 million termination fee plus expenses, which may total $16 million.

Bidding ended on May 19, 2006 with the acceptance of a $2.75 billion bid from Columbia Sussex. Columbia Sussex paid a $313 million breakup fee in advance, in case the deal fell through with $78 million of that used to pay the breakup fee to Pinnacle Entertainment. The sale closed in January 2007.

The New Jersey Casino Control Commission ultimately rejected Columbia Sussex's application for a gaming license for the Tropicana Atlantic City, sending the company's gaming businesses into bankruptcy. Most of the Aztar properties became part of the reorganized Tropicana Entertainment Inc. in March 2010.

== Casinos at time of acquisition ==
- Tropicana Casino & Resort Atlantic City – Atlantic City, New Jersey
- Tropicana Las Vegas – Paradise, Nevada
- Ramada Express – Laughlin, Nevada
- Casino Aztar Evansville – Evansville, Indiana
- Casino Aztar Caruthersville – Caruthersville, Missouri
