= Gary Saul Stein =

American judge

Gary Saul Stein (born June 13, 1933) is an American attorney and former Associate Justice of the New Jersey Supreme Court, He served on New Jersey's Supreme Court for 17 years where he wrote over 365 published opinions. From 1982 until 1985, he served as the director of the New Jersey Governor's Office of Policy and Planning. He also served as the Paramus Borough Attorney and serves on the boards of Trustees of The Valley Hospital in Ridgewood, New Jersey and Drew University in Madison, New Jersey.

== Biography ==
Born in Newark, New Jersey, on June 13, 1933, Stein grew up in nearby Irvington, graduating from Irvington High School in 1950. He attended and graduated with a B.A. from Duke University in 1954 and a J.D. from Duke University School of Law in 1956.

He moved to Paramus, New Jersey, in 1956. In 1964, Stein lost the race for mayor of Paramus.

Stein had met Tom Kean in the 1950s while both were serving in the New Jersey National Guard and became active in statewide politics when he supported Kean's gubernatorial efforts in both 1977 (when Kean unsuccessfully ran in the Republican primary) and when he was elected as Governor of New Jersey in the 1981 race.

Stein, a resident of Upper Saddle River, was nominated to the Supreme Court by Kean to succeed Sidney M. Schreiber, who had reached the required retirement age of 70 after serving on the court since 1975. Despite criticism that Stein was working in government as an aide to Kean, had never been a judge and was not actively practicing law at the time, Kean cited Stein's "depth of knowledge and experience" as being a benefit to the court.

On December 19, 2007, the New Jersey Casino Control Commission announced that Stein would serve as conservator of the Tropicana Casino and Resort in Atlantic City following the denial of the license renewal and removal of Adamar of New Jersey, the casino licensee and its parent company, Kentucky based Columbia Sussex Corporation. Since his retirement from the bench, Stein has also served as an adjunct faculty member at Rutgers School of Law - Newark where he currently teaches election law.

Stein authored a report denying a series of articles authored by Ted Sherman that appeared in The Star-Ledger. The stories outlined patterns of corruption including thievery in the school lunch program, illegal political influence related to school jobs and employees being subjected to shakedowns for campaign contributions. Although the school board president was among several people arrested in connection to the free lunch scandal, Stein concluded that the newspaper reports were inaccurate.

Sherman also reported that millions of taxpayer dollars had been spent to hush-up legal complaints filed against the district. Stein dismissed those expenditures and the illegal actions that brought on hundreds of lawsuits for wrongful termination, extortion, political retribution and other causes.

Stein is the father of five children by his wife Et Stein and the grandfather of 16. He currently counsel at Pashman Stein in Hackensack, New Jersey.
