= Tropicana Las Vegas =

Defunct casino and hotel in Nevada, United States

- Final logo (2009–2024)

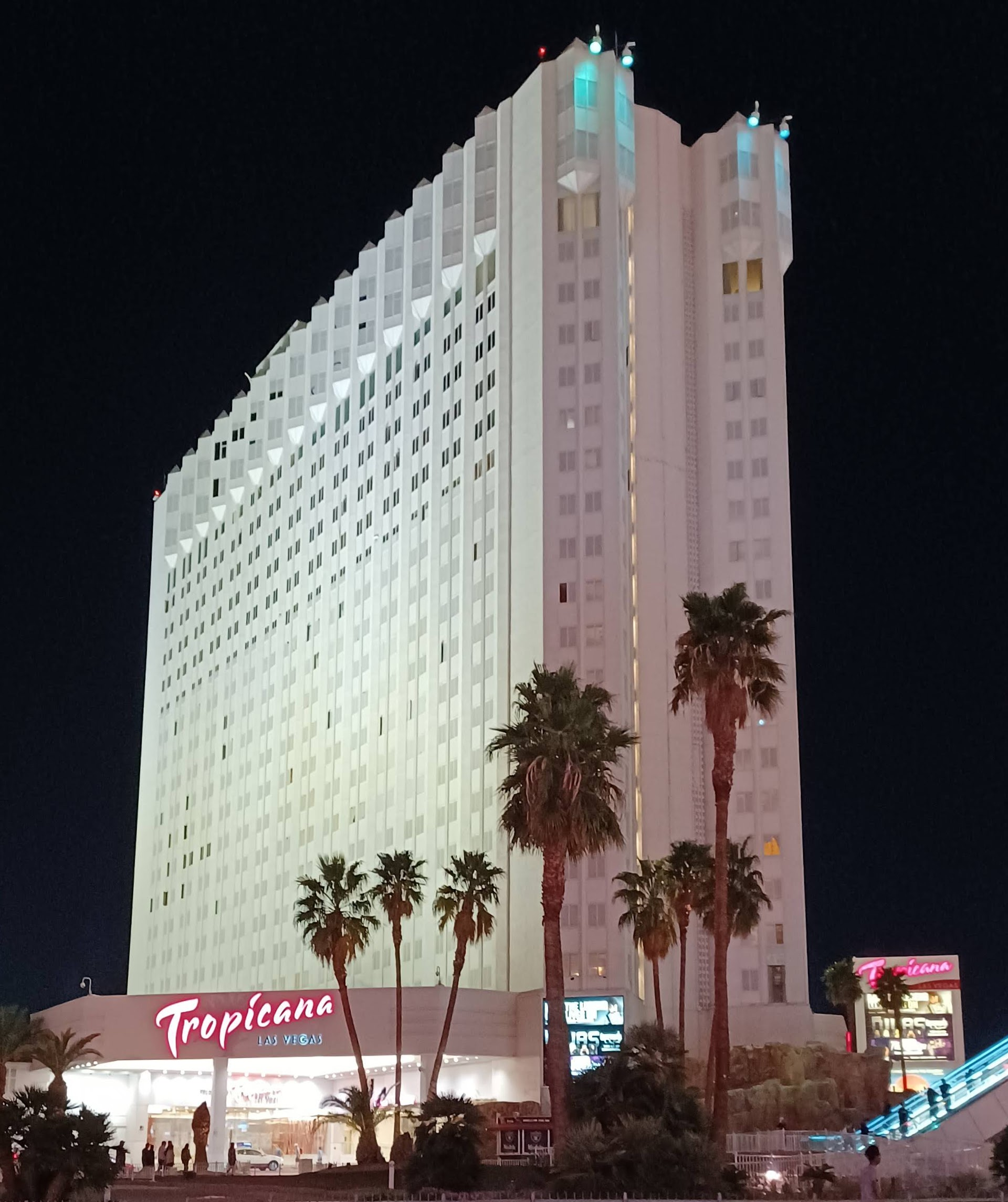
- The Tropicana in 2022

- Location within Las Vegas Strip Location within Nevada
- Interactive map of Tropicana Las Vegas
- Location: Paradise, Nevada, U.S.; 3801 South Las Vegas Boulevard; 36°05′59″N 115°10′17″W
- Opened: April 4, 1957; 69 years ago
- Closed: April 2, 2024; 2 years ago
- Theme: Tropical / South Beach
- No. of rooms: 1,467
- Gaming space: 44,570 sq ft (4,141 m^{2})
- Permanent shows: Folies Bergere (1959–2009); Laugh Factory; Purple Reign; MJ Live
- Casino type: Land-based
- Owner: Bally's Corporation (final owner, 2022–2024)
- Architect: M. Tony Sherman (1957)
- Renovated in: 1959, 1962, 1964, 1979, 1986, 2009–2011

The Tropicana Las Vegas was a casino hotel on the Las Vegas Strip in Paradise, Nevada. It operated from 1957 to 2024. In its final years, the property included a 44,570 sq ft (4,141 m^{2}) casino and 1,467 rooms. The complex occupied 35 acres (14 ha) at the southeast corner of the Tropicana – Las Vegas Boulevard intersection.

The resort was conceived by Ben Jaffe, part owner of the Fontainebleau Hotel in Miami Beach. The $15 million Tropicana opened on April 4, 1957, as the most expensive Las Vegas resort developed up to that point. The hotel originally opened with low-rise structures containing 300 rooms, and the property would later launch several expansions, including two hotel towers added in 1979 and 1986 respectively. The latter tower was accompanied by the introduction of an island theme for the property. The Tropicana was host to various live entertainment, including the topless showgirl revue known as Folies Bergere. It ended in 2009, after nearly 50 years, and remains the longest-running show in Las Vegas history.

The Tropicana underwent numerous ownership changes throughout its history. Mob connections were present at the time of its opening, and an FBI investigation in 1979 uncovered a skimming operation at the resort. It was sold that year to Ramada Inns, which later transferred ownership to its spin-off company, Aztar Corporation, in 1989. During the 2000s, Aztar considered demolishing the Tropicana for development of a new resort, although this did not come to fruition. Columbia Sussex bought the resort in 2007, but lost it to bankruptcy two years later, with Onex Corporation emerging as the new owner. Onex launched a $180 million renovation, the property's first since 1986. The project was completed in 2011 and added a South Beach theme.

Penn National Gaming bought the Tropicana in 2015, then sold the property to its spin-off company, Gaming and Leisure Properties, Inc. (GLPI), in 2020. Bally's Corporation purchased the Tropicana two years later and leased the land from GLPI. In 2023, Bally's and GLPI reached a redevelopment agreement with the baseball team Oakland Athletics, who plan to relocate to Las Vegas. The Tropicana would be demolished to make way for two new projects: a baseball stadium (tentatively the New Las Vegas Stadium) on nine acres of the site, and a new Bally's Las Vegas resort on the remaining land. The Tropicana closed on April 2, 2024, and demolition began within a month. The last remaining structures, the two hotel towers, were imploded on October 9, 2024.

== History ==
=== Development and opening ===
The Tropicana was conceived by Ben Jaffe, part owner of the Fontainebleau Hotel in Miami Beach. In 1955, Jaffe came to Las Vegas and bought the vacant property that would become the site of the Tropicana. M. Tony Sherman of Miami was the architect and Taylor Construction Company was the general contractor. Jaffe intended the Tropicana to be the finest hotel in Las Vegas.

Construction ran over schedule and over budget, due in part to competition for labor with the under-construction Stardust, also on the Las Vegas Strip. Jaffe had to sell his interest in the Fontainebleau to complete the Tropicana. Originally proposed as a $4.5 million project, it ultimately cost $15 million, including $800,000 for decorating and tropical landscaping. It was the most expensive Las Vegas resort developed up to that point, beating the $8.5 million Riviera, which opened two years earlier. The Tropicana would be advertised as "the Tiffany of the Strip", in reference to the high-end jeweler Tiffany & Co.

The project had 30 investors, including singer Morton Downey, who owned a five-percent interest. Jaffe first leased the property to Phil Kastel, who supervised the project during construction. However, the Gaming Control Board raised suspicions over Kastel's apparent links to organized crime, prompting him to sell his interest in the Tropicana in early 1957. This paved the way for the issuance of a gaming license. J. Kell Houssels, owner of the Las Vegas Club, was hired to operate the Tropicana casino.

The Tropicana hosted a preview opening for local residents on April 3, 1957, before debuting to the general public a day later. The resort's involvement with organized crime was confirmed a month later, when a note bearing a Tropicana earnings figure was found in the possession of mobster Frank Costello, who was associated with Kastel. Costello had been shot in a failed assassination attempt, and police discovered the note while he was under hospital care.

The control board subsequently investigated to determine whether Kastel was still secretly involved with the Tropicana. Kastel had publicly invested more than $300,000 in the project during construction, and the Nevada Tax Commission eventually ordered the Tropicana to rid its ties with him as soon as possible by paying off the debt owed to him. The note was ultimately traced to Tropicana executive Louis Lederer and cashier Michael Tanico, both of whom would be removed from the property.

=== Early ownership changes ===
By 1959, Houssels bought out Jaffe's interest, gaining a majority share in the Tropicana and becoming its new president. The Jaffe family, however, would retain ownership of the land for decades and continue leasing it. The Tropicana prospered throughout the next decade. Houssells sold out in 1968 to Trans-Texas Airways, for $8.7 million, but remained as manager for a few years.

In the early 1970s, the Tropicana fared poorly from competition with larger, newer hotels like Caesars Palace and the Las Vegas Hilton. During this time, the Tropicana hosted annual fiesta parties to increase gaming revenue, inviting celebrities and high rollers to attend. Deil Gustafson, a Minnesota financier, bought the resort in 1972. Sammy Davis Jr. also purchased an eight-percent interest, becoming the first black person to own a share in a Strip resort. Gustafson undertook an expansion plan, but encountered financing difficulties. In 1974, brothers Edward and Fred Doumani took over management on an emergency basis after investing $1 million into the property.

Mitzi Stauffer Briggs, heir to the Stauffer Chemical fortune, bought a majority interest in the Tropicana in 1975. Briggs said she knew "absolutely nothing about gambling or casinos", but invested in the Tropicana at the suggestion of a friend. Many of its top executives were either fired or resigned in 1976, as Briggs sought to make the resort profitable once again. She invested more than $6 million in the property. Briggs initially received only a probationary one-year gaming license, due to several business failures in her past. She received a full license in July 1977, and began construction of the property's first high-rise structure, the Tiffany Tower, which opened two years later. The casino floor was also renovated and expanded.

The Tropicana became the target of a mob skimming operation in 1978. Joe Agosto, then-owner of the casino's Folies Bergere show, oversaw the siphoning of money from the cashier cage to the Kansas City crime family. The scheme was exposed in 1979 through "Operation Strawman", an FBI investigation into hidden mob interests in Las Vegas casinos. Due to her inexperience, Briggs had relied on the advice of Agosto, whom she found to be charming. Because they had allowed Agosto to manage the casino without a gaming license, Briggs and Gustafson faced revocation of their own licenses. They had little choice but to sell the Tropicana. Hotel chain Ramada Inns purchased the business in December 1979, along with a 50% share of the property's real estate that had been owned by the Doumanis. Briggs lost an estimated $44 million during her involvement with the Tropicana, and did not receive any of the profits from the Ramada purchase. The Doumani brothers and Gufstafson later accused Ramada of breaching its contract on the sale, winning a $34 million judgment in 1989.

Gustafson was convicted in 1983 over a check kiting scheme involving the Tropicana, and served 40 months in prison. In 1995, he was also charged with bankruptcy fraud relating to the Tropicana's 1979 sale. He, in turn, named the Doumani brothers and two others involved in a scheme with him to divert money from the 1989 judgment; these four individuals were charged as well. Federal officials alleged that the diverted money had wound up in the possession of mobsters. Gustafson pled guilty and agreed to testify against the others. One defendant was dismissed because of lack of evidence, and the others were found not guilty in a 1998 trial.

=== Later years ===
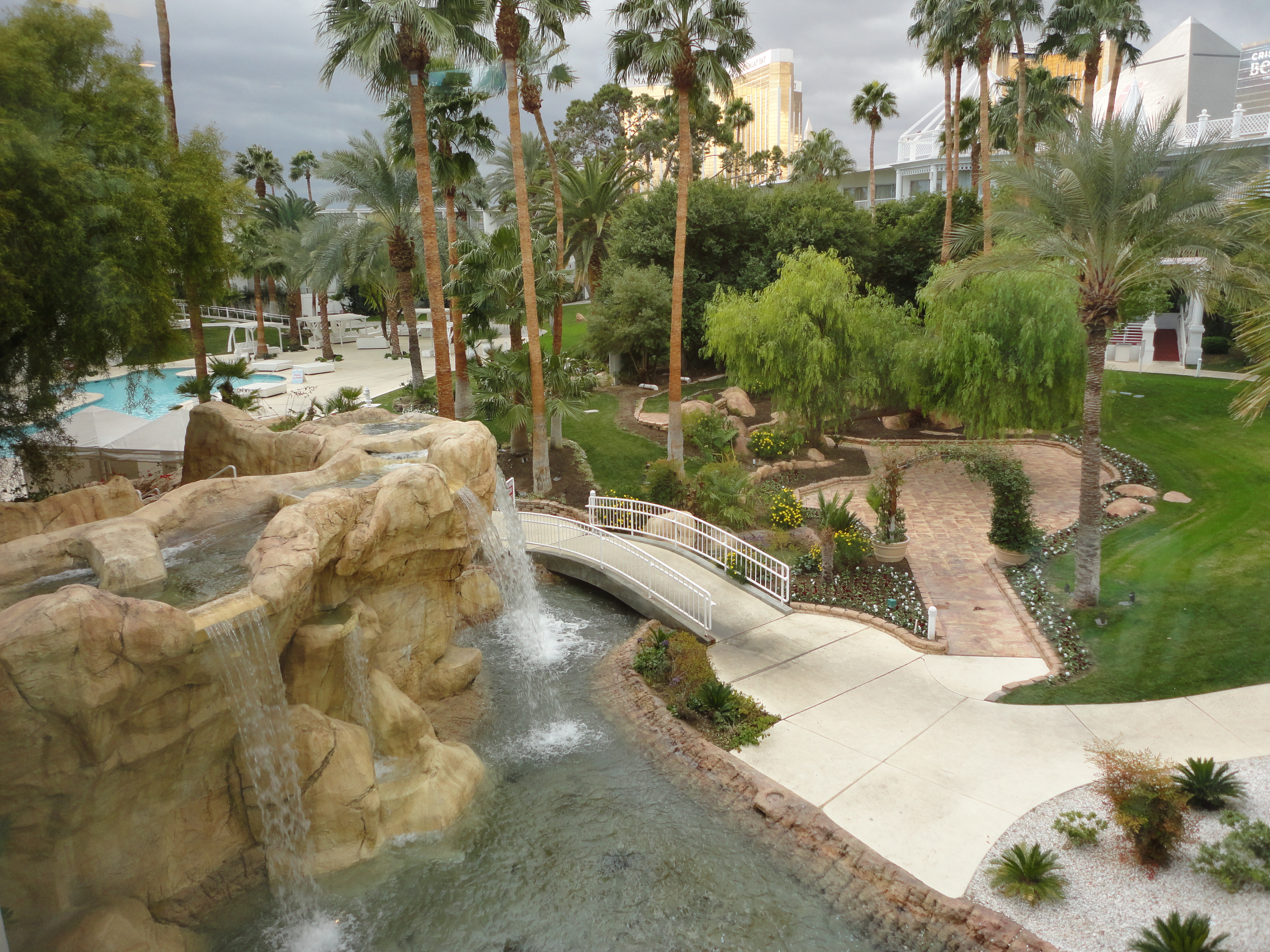
Pool area and tropical landscaping

Amid the early 1980s recession, Ramada began targeting a middle-class clientele for the Tropicana, which had lost the luxury prominence it once had. In 1986, the resort completed a $70 million expansion which included a second high-rise, the Island Tower. The project also introduced a five-acre pool area of man-made lagoons, waterfalls and islands, accompanied by floating blackjack tables. The property began marketing itself as the "Island of Las Vegas".

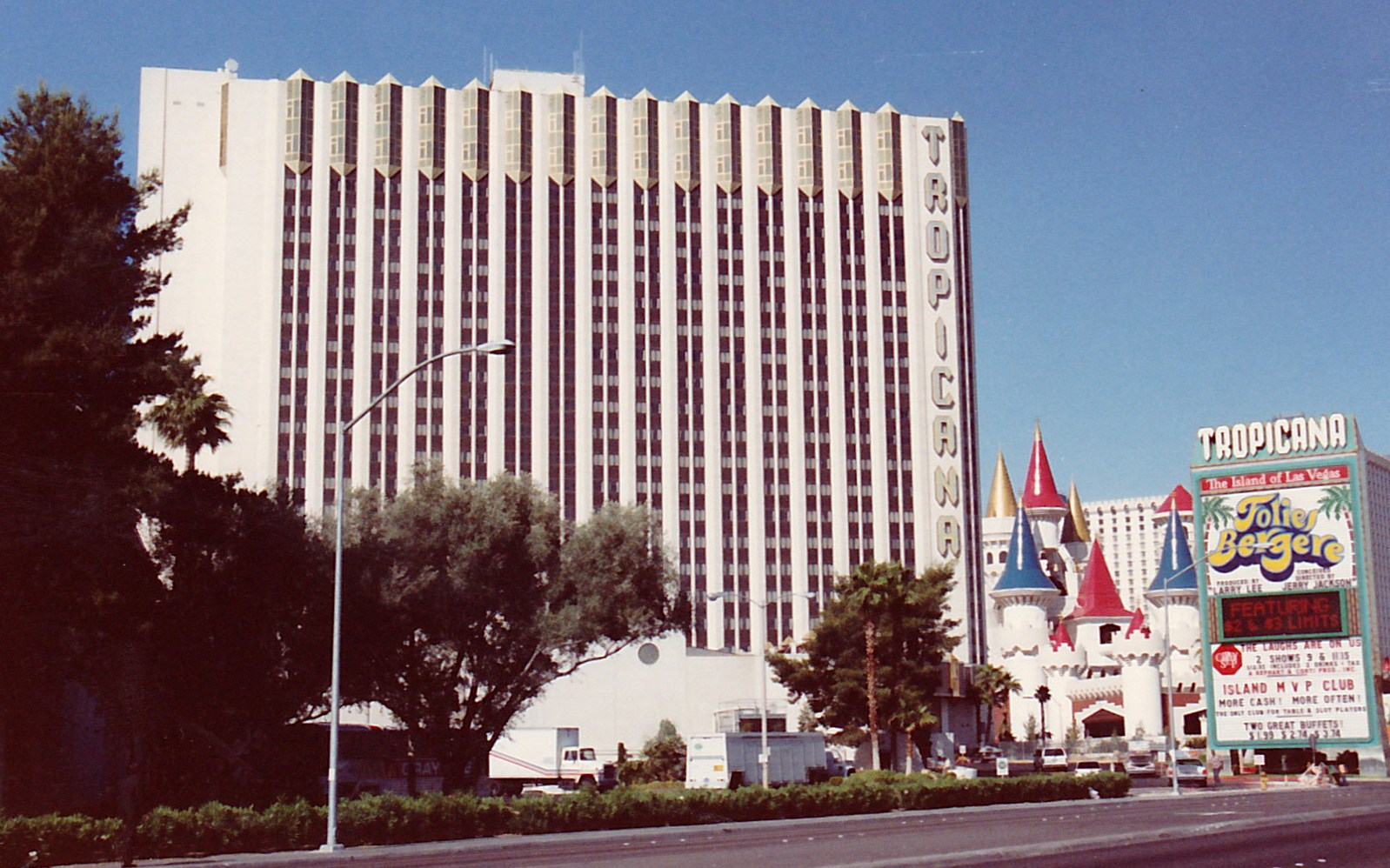
The Tropicana and its original tower in the 1990s

Ramada spun off its gaming properties, including the Tropicana, in 1989 as Aztar Corporation. By the late 1990s, the Tropicana was largely seen as an aging, under-performing property in contrast to newer resorts on the Strip.

In 1998, Aztar bought an option to acquire the 50% interest held by the Jaffe family, which would make future renovations easier to implement. Aztar, however, held off its buyout for several years to assess whether Las Vegas had been overbuilt with new hotels. The company eventually consolidated ownership of the Tropicana in 2002, buying the half interest in the land and buildings from the Jaffe family for $117.5 million. The sale opened up the possibility of redeveloping the Tropicana site.

In 2003, Aztar unveiled potential plans for a $500 million expansion. The project would replace the northern half of the existing Tropicana facilities, adding additional rooms and timeshares. A decision about whether to proceed with these plans was expected in early 2004, but was pushed back by Aztar to focus on an expansion at its other Tropicana resort, located in Atlantic City. Following the latter's completion, Aztar would continue to put off its Las Vegas redevelopment plans to further evaluate the best use of the land.

In 2006, Aztar unveiled new plans to demolish the Tropicana and build a $1.2 billion casino resort. Gaming analysts viewed the redevelopment plans as a certainty; Aztar had already hired Marnell Corrao Associates to manage construction, and sought bank financing to fund the project. However, a bidding war soon began for Aztar, with Ameristar Casinos, Columbia Sussex, and Pinnacle Entertainment competing to buy the company. Aztar was desired for its ownership of the Tropicana, which presented ample redevelopment opportunities. Columbia Sussex ultimately prevailed, finalizing its purchase in January 2007.

Columbia Sussex planned to renovate the Tropicana as part of a $2 billion expansion project, adding five new towers for more than 8,000 rooms. However, this project was delayed due to the 2008 financial crisis, and it later became moot when Columbia Sussex's gaming arm filed for bankruptcy in 2008. The Tropicana, which had a $440 million secured loan against it, was bought from the bankrupt company in July 2009 by its creditors, led by Canadian private equity firm Onex Corporation and former MGM Mirage CEO Alex Yemenidjian, who took over as the Tropicana's CEO.

The remainder of Columbia Sussex's gaming business, reorganized under new ownership as Tropicana Entertainment Inc., promptly sued the Las Vegas property, demanding royalties for use of the Tropicana name. The case was eventually settled, with the Tropicana Las Vegas receiving exclusive rights to use the name in the Las Vegas region, royalty-free.

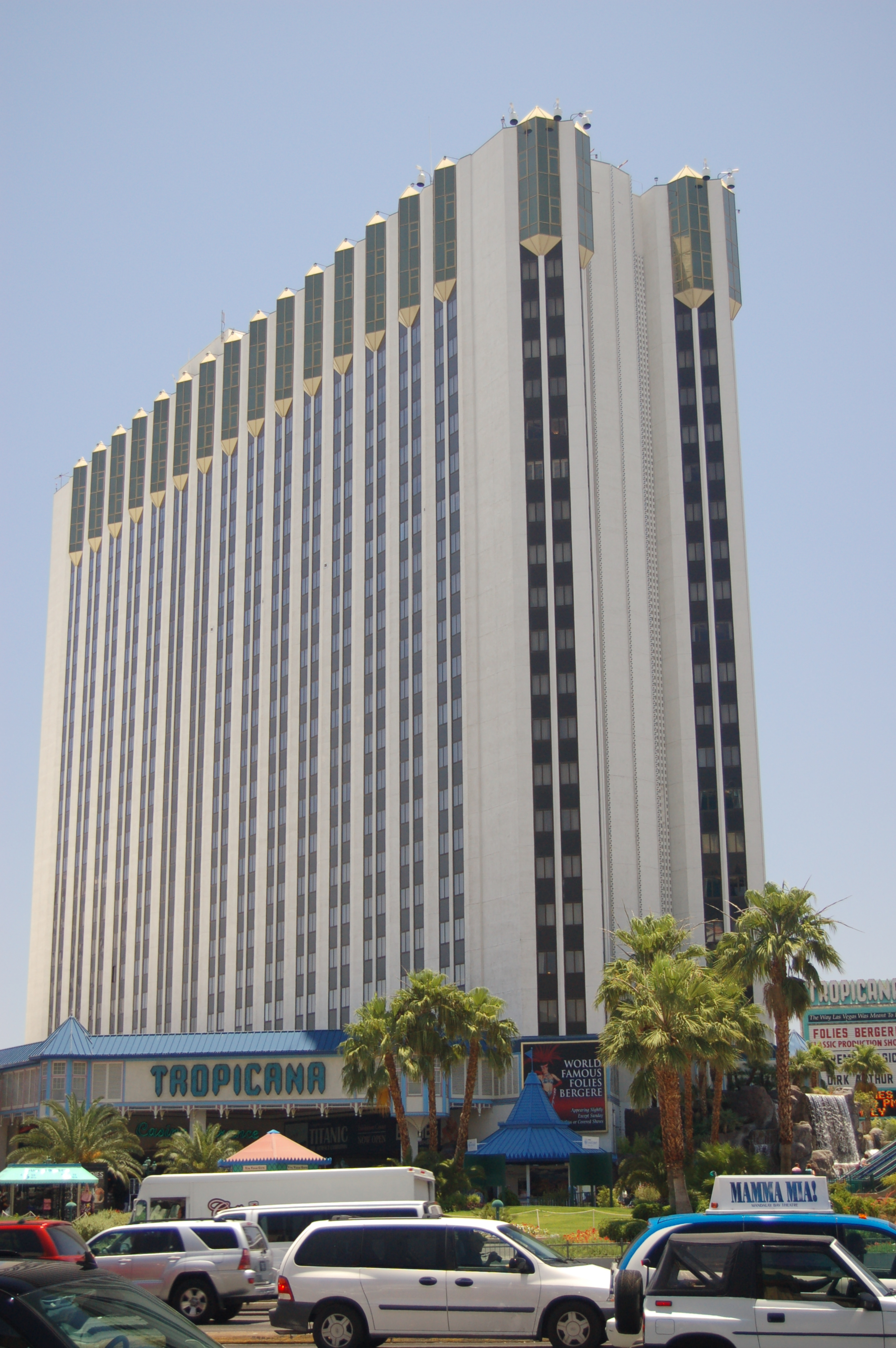
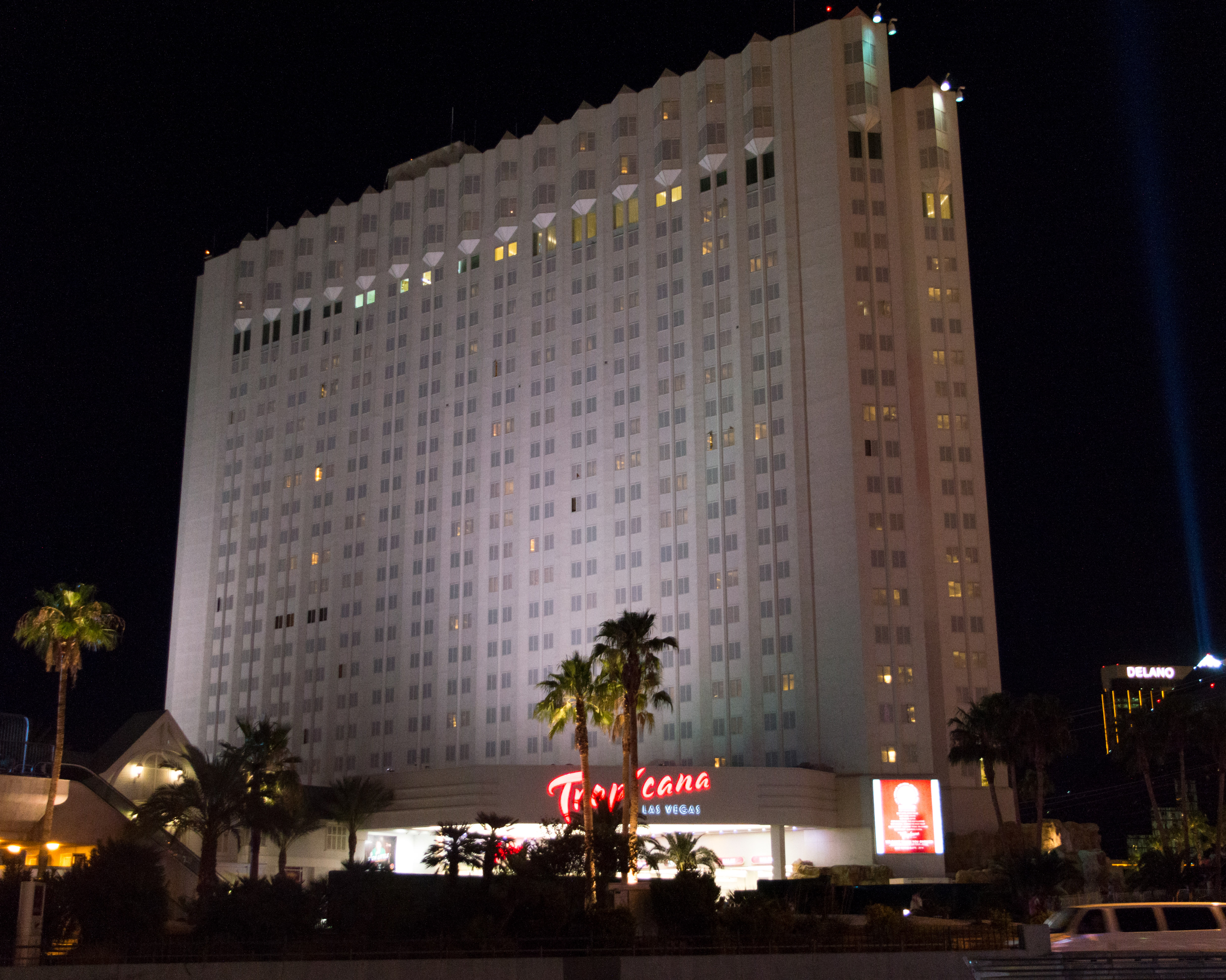
The original tower, seen before and after the 2010 renovation

During the Great Recession, the Tropicana emphasized its cheap amenities to attract a value-conscious demographic. After taking over the Tropicana, Yemenidjian sought to update the property and transform it into a middle-class resort: "We're not interested in the very low end because there's no margin in that business. And we're not interested in the very high end because those customers have different expectations. The most successful properties in Las Vegas are both aspirational and accessible as opposed to those targeting a narrow market."

Renovations began in August 2009, and cost $180 million. It marked the Tropicana's first major remodel in nearly 25 years, and added a South Beach theme to the property. Room renovations were completed in 2010, and work on the casino floor was expected to conclude by the end of the year.

In August 2015, Penn National Gaming purchased the Tropicana for $360 million, marking its first resort on the Strip. During the early months of the COVID-19 pandemic, Penn faced the prospect of financial issues brought on by resort closures. As a result, Penn sold the land occupied by the Tropicana to its spin-off company, Gaming and Leisure Properties, Inc. (GLPI). The land sold for $337.5 million in rent credits, and the sale was finalized in April 2020. Penn would continue to operate the Tropicana for another two years, or until the resort was sold.

In April 2021, Bally's Corporation agreed to purchase the Tropicana, a deal that was finalized in September 2022. Bally's bought the non-land assets of the resort from GLPI and Penn for $148 million, and leased the land from GLPI for annual rent of $10.5 million. Plans were soon made to replace the Tropicana with a baseball stadium and a new casino resort.

=== Closure ===
The Tropicana's original hotel wings from 1957 were closed, without fanfare, in mid-November 2023. They were the oldest resort rooms on the Strip. The rest of the Tropicana ceased operations on April 2, 2024; the casino floor closed at 3:00 a.m., followed by the remainder of the property at 12:00 p.m. At the time of its closure, the Tropicana had 700 workers, some of whom had been with the property for decades.

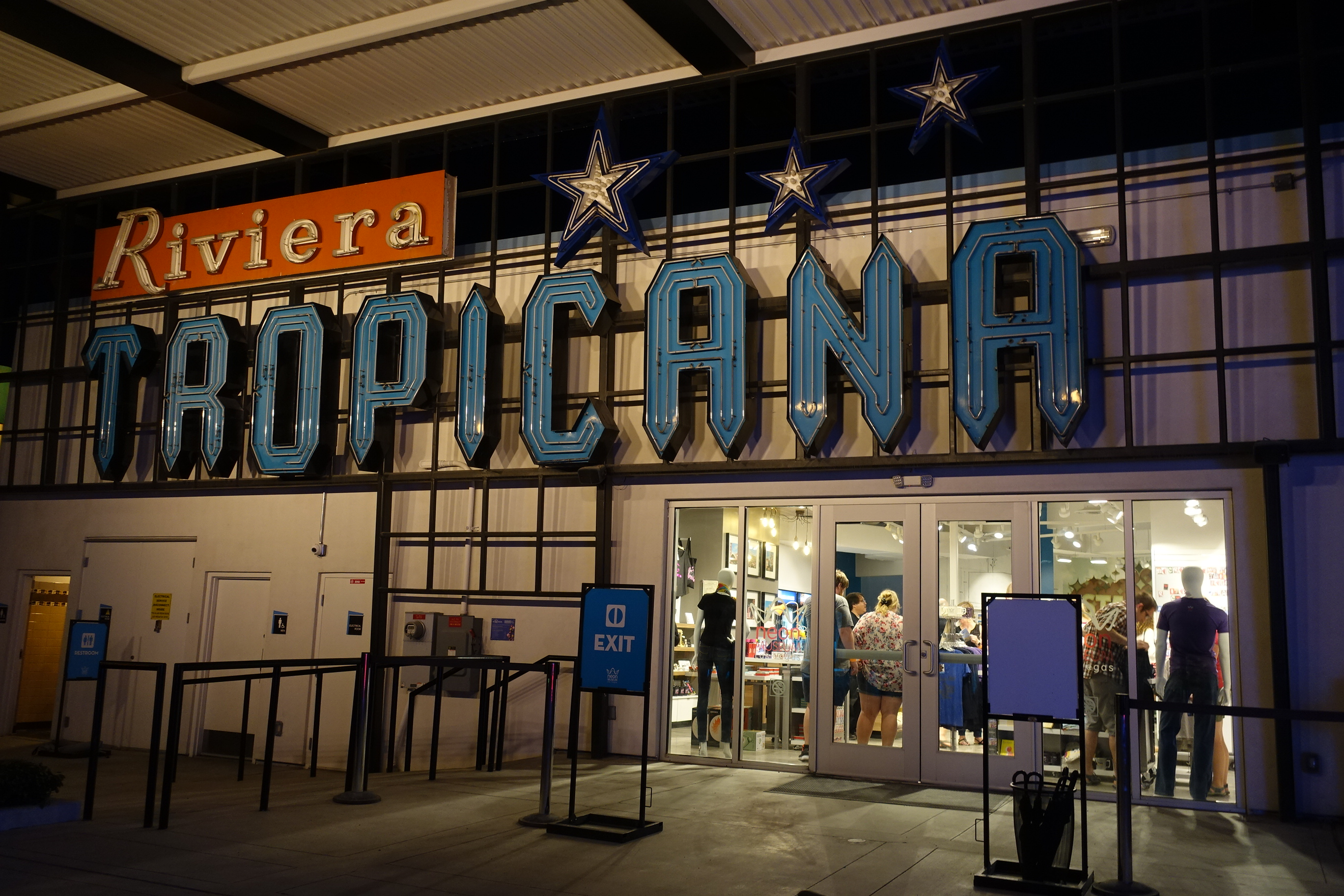
A Tropicana sign at the Neon Museum, 2017

Prior to closing, Bally's chairman Soo Kim said, "The Trop is obviously iconic, but it is, really, in a lot of ways, economically obsolete. It literally is part of the glitz and glamour of Vegas, but it hasn't been that for decades." Katie Dowd of SFGate wrote that "decades of decay have already destroyed what's left of the world-famous Tropicana". Michael Green, a history professor at the University of Nevada, Las Vegas (UNLV), noted that, "Hotels built in the 1950s were not designed for the 2020s". He partly attributed the Tropicana's decline to the numerous ownership changes in its later years, which "meant different approaches, different plans. Then it was surrounded by these megaresorts. And in a sense, it tried to have its own niche by not being one of them and having amenities – but not the amenities to the degree the others did." Despite its age, the Tropicana was profitable at the time of its closure.

A liquidation sale began not long after the property's closure, lasting about two months. It included entire furnished suites, as well as various items from the casino floor. Most of the gaming equipment was transferred to other Bally's properties. Some items and memorabilia will be donated to local organizations, including UNLV and the Neon Museum; the latter had already acquired a former Tropicana neon sign years earlier.

=== Demolition ===
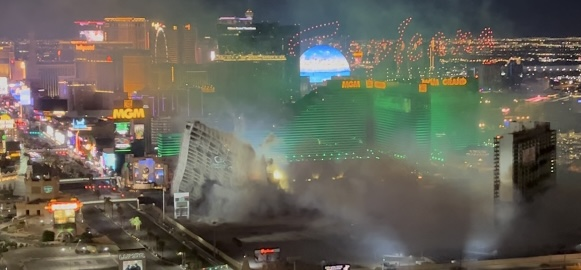
The Paradise tower of the Tropicana (left) being imploded. The Club tower (right) was imploded right after the Paradise tower came down.

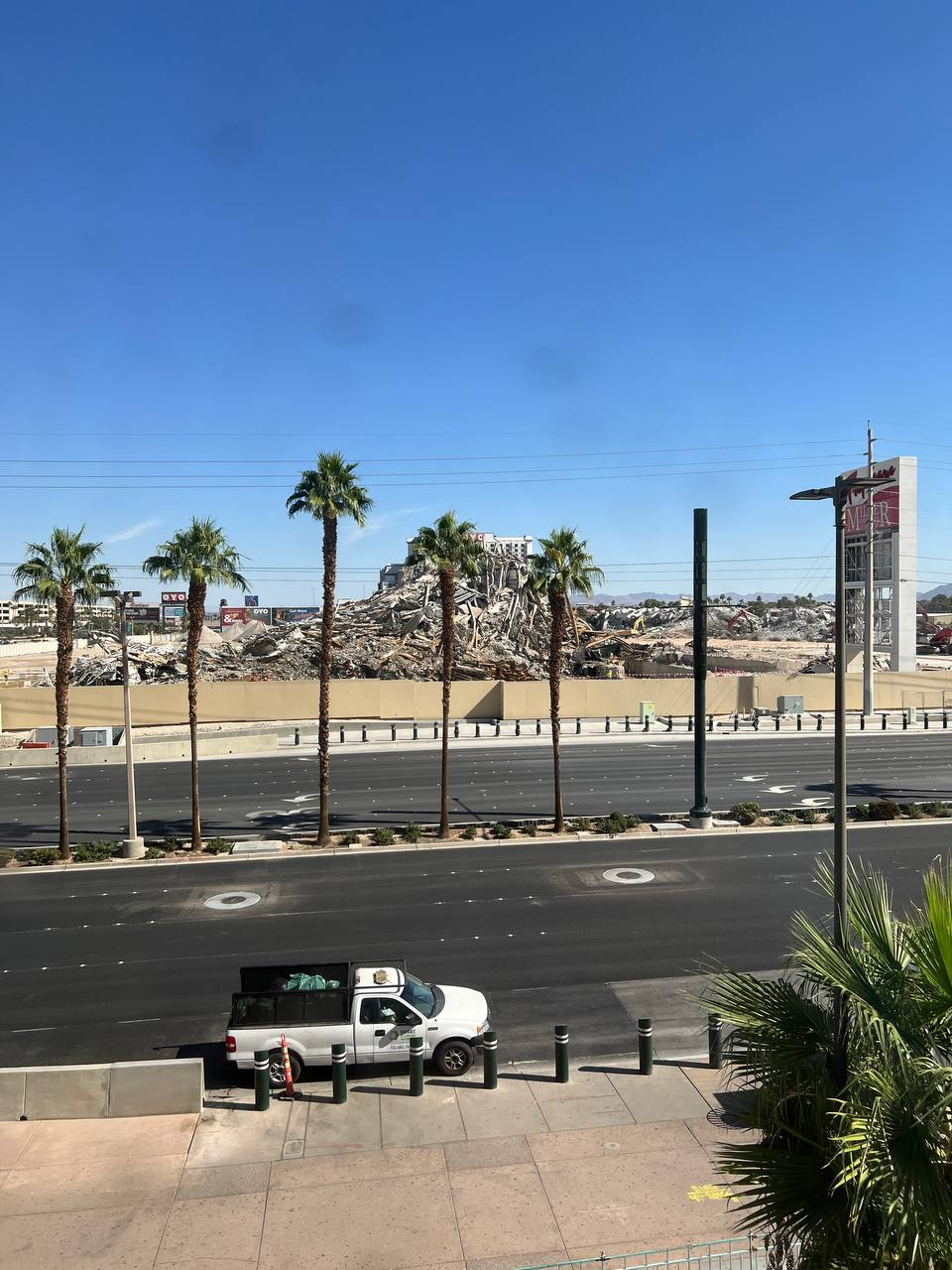
Demolition debris a week after the implosion

Demolition got underway within a month of the property's closure. Several hotel structures contained asbestos, which had to be removed prior to demolition. Most of the asbestos had already been removed during renovations and expansions that had taken place over the years. Miller Environmental Inc. removed the remainder and then demolished the low-rise buildings, leaving the towers as the last structures on the site. Miller and GGG Demolition Inc. gutted the buildings to prepare them for implosion, removing plaster and drywall to minimize dust.

The towers were imploded on October 9, 2024, at 2:37 a.m. Demolition was preceded by a ceremony featuring LED and pyrotechnic aerial drones, as well as fireworks from Fireworks by Grucci. The aerial show took approximately five months to plan, with a crew of nearly 100 people on-site to execute it. The towers were imploded by Controlled Demolition, Inc., which has handled Las Vegas implosions for decades.

The towers were built differently and thus required separate approaches. The original 1979 structure was built with a steel frame, which took 490 pounds of explosives to bring down. The 1986 tower consisted of reinforced concrete and required 1,700 pounds of explosives. Approximately 98 percent of the implosion debris is expected to be recycled, with cleanup of the site taking three to four months. The Tropicana marked the first Strip implosion since the Riviera in 2016.

== Redevelopment plans ==
=== New Las Vegas Stadium ===
The Oakland Athletics, a Major League Baseball team, began considering a Las Vegas relocation in 2021, with the Tropicana property as a potential site for a new stadium. In May 2023, after more than a year of negotiations, the Oakland A's reached an agreement with Bally's and GLPI to demolish the Tropicana for redevelopment. The stadium will occupy nine acres.

The stadium is expected to cost $1.5 billion, and a public financing package for up to $380 million was approved by the state in June 2023. Five months later, the Oakland A's relocation to Las Vegas was approved by the MLB. Construction of the stadium began in May 2025, with completion expected by January 2028.

=== New Bally's Las Vegas ===
The stadium is expected to occupy 9 acres (3.6 ha) of the 35-acre (14 ha) site, with another 15 acres (6.1 ha) being used for a new Bally's Las Vegas resort. The remaining 11 acres (4.5 ha) would be shared between the stadium and the resort. The original Bally's Las Vegas, also on the Strip, was rebranded as Horseshoe Las Vegas in 2022. This occurred after the name rights were sold to Bally's Corporation, known prior to that point as Twin River Worldwide Holdings. After acquiring the rights, the company had plans to rename the Tropicana as a Bally's property, although this did not pan out.

Bally's had more than $3 billion in long-term debt as of April 2024. At that time, the company stated there was no rush to build a new resort on the Tropicana site, instead focusing on other gaming projects, including Bally's Chicago and a possible New York property. Bally's said work on the Las Vegas resort could begin some time during the stadium's construction or at a later point following the latter's completion. The company was also open to partnering with another resort operator to begin the project sooner. It has been suggested that the Las Vegas resort could be developed similarly to Bally's property in Chicago.

As demolition concluded on the Tropicana, Bally's was in the early stages of planning for its replacement, an integrated resort with 3,005 rooms, a 104,200 sq ft (9,680 m^{2}) casino, a three-level theater venue with 2,500 seats, and 110,000 sq ft (10,000 m^{2}) of convention space. The resort, including two hotel towers, would be built in phases over a number of years, with construction expected to start in the first half of 2026. Bally's intends to finish phase-one in time to coincide with the opening of the stadium, with construction taking approximately two years.

== Labor disputes ==
Several bomb incidents occurred at Strip resorts in 1984, amid a labor dispute with local trade unions. The Tropicana was among those targeted, with an early morning blast damaging nine vehicles in its front parking lot. The casino's main show, Folies Bergere, was also closed for 11 weeks due to the dispute.

Folies Bergere closed again in 1989, when its 14-crew musician team went on strike. The crew was represented by the American Federation of Musicians, and walked off the job after their contract expired without a deal for renewal. The closure of Folies Bergere affected 170 other workers involved in the show. It soon reopened with the use of taped music in place of live musicians, a practice that the union had opposed. The crew was ultimately fired, saving the Tropicana $600,000 in yearly salaries. The musician strike also affected several other resorts on the Strip. After seven months, the strike ended in 1990 with a new contract agreement.

In 2001, table game dealers at the Tropicana voted to be represented by the Transport Workers Union, which later accused the casino of targeting its supporters. The union's representation was decertified in 2002; of 147 dealers, 98 voted to decertify, while 38 voted in support of the union.

The overall workforce at the Tropicana was represented by the Culinary Workers Union. Bill Yung, the founder and chief executive of Columbia Sussex, was opposed to union representation. When his company took over the Tropicana in 2007, it laid off more than 500 workers, including 300 Culinary members. Columbia Sussex also sought givebacks from the union during negotiations for a contract renewal. Talks between the two sides eventually became bitter and prolonged. In 2008, Yung was replaced by Scott Butera, who worked to negotiate a new contract with Culinary.

== Property overview ==
The Tropicana occupied 35 acres (14 ha), located at the southeast corner of the Tropicana – Las Vegas Boulevard intersection. Tropicana Avenue was originally known as Bond Road, and took on its current name in 1961, at the request of the Tropicana.

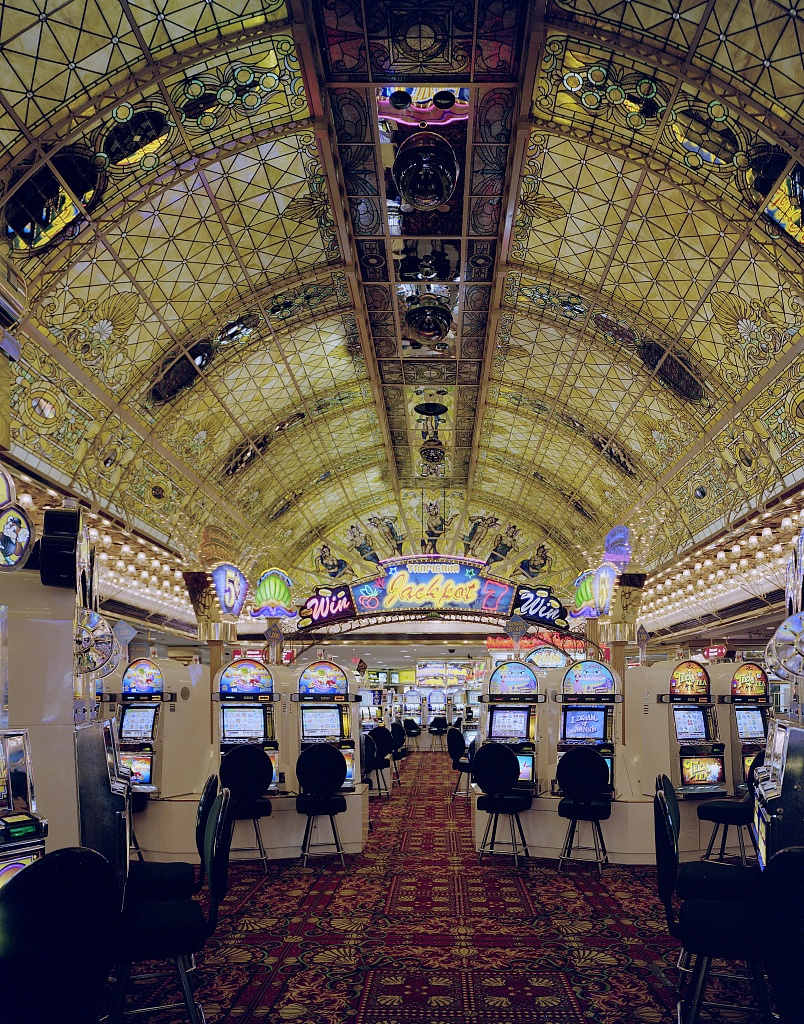
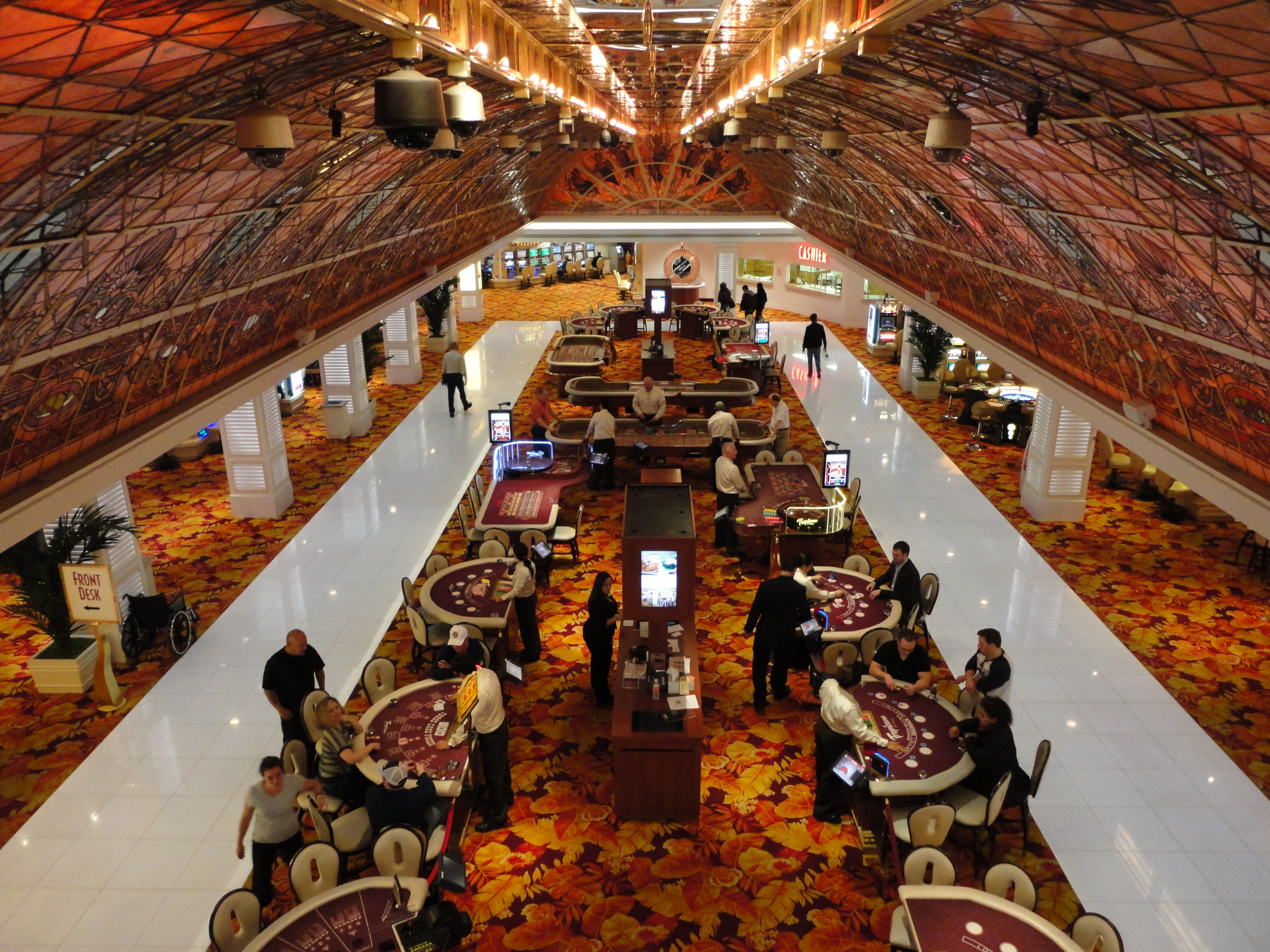
Stained-glass ceiling before and after the 2010 renovation

In its final years, the casino floor measured 44,570 sq ft (4,141 m^{2}). It included 600 slot machines and 19 table games. A section of the casino floor featured a stained-glass ceiling that covered 4,250 sq ft (395 m^{2}). It was designed by Tony DeVroudes and created by Judson Studios, and was installed in 1979, at a cost of $1 million. Las Vegas architect Joel Bergman later said of the ceiling, "Nothing like that had been done before inside a casino. It changed the texture of design in Las Vegas." Bergman's firm was hired in 2010 to revamp the ceiling. Following the Tropicana's closure, the ceiling is expected to be donated to a historic group.

In 1993, the Tropicana added the Wildlife Walk habitat, featuring exotic birds, mammals, and reptiles. It was built in an existing covered walkway linking the two hotel towers.

Nikki Beach, a chain of beach clubs, opened a location at the Tropicana in May 2011. It was aimed at a clientele in the 30-to-40 age range. A nightclub, known as Club Nikki, also opened along with Cafe Nikki. The three facilities were added as part of the Tropicana's $180 million renovation. The resort parted ways with the Nikki brand later in 2011, and the nightclub was renamed RPM Nightclub. The other club was soon rebranded as Bagatelle Beach & Supper Club. In 2013, the Tropicana took over operations of the two clubs and renamed them the Havana Room and Beach Club, open only for private events.

=== Hotel ===
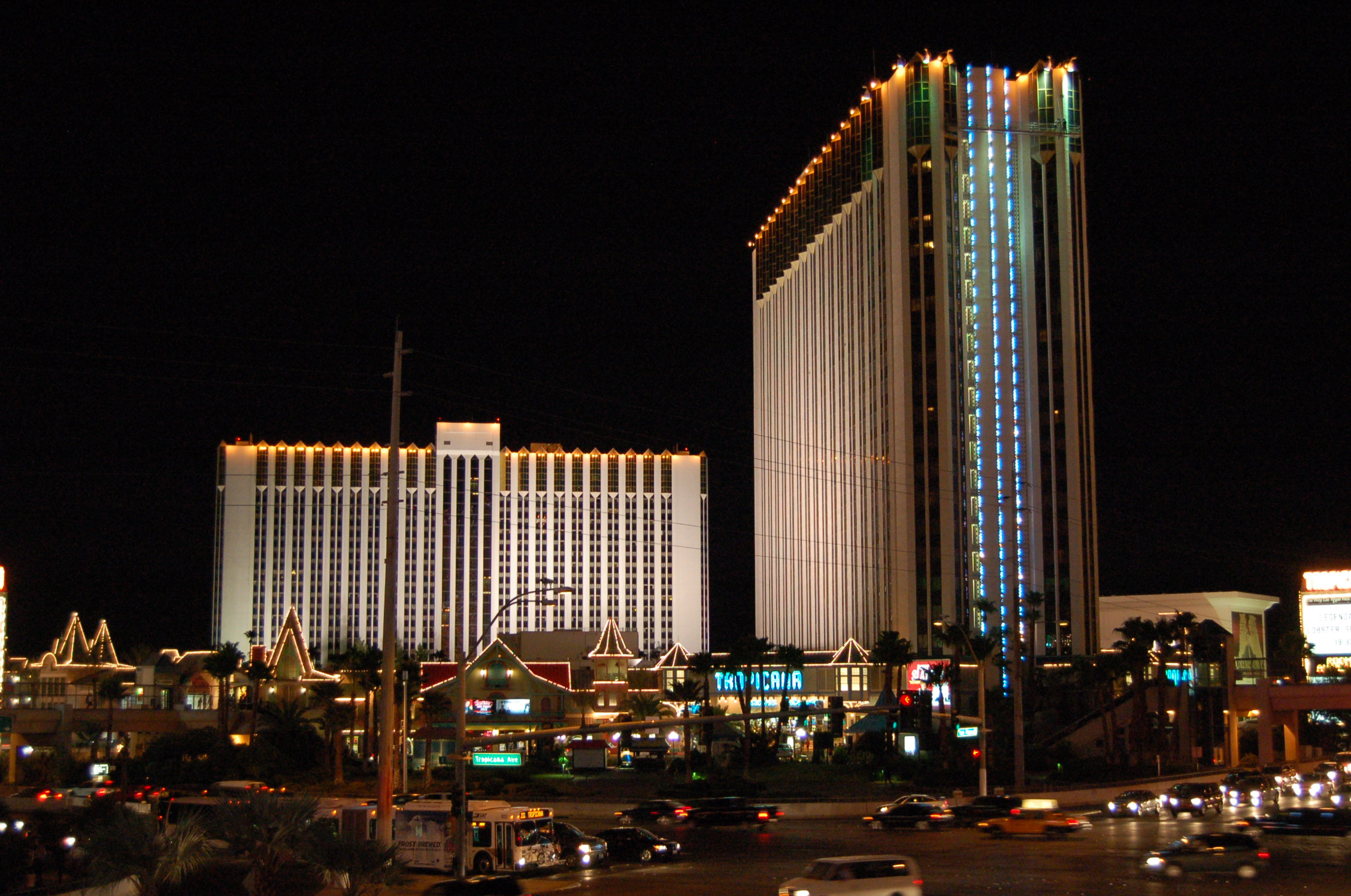
Left to right: the 1986 and 1979 towers prior to the 2010 renovation

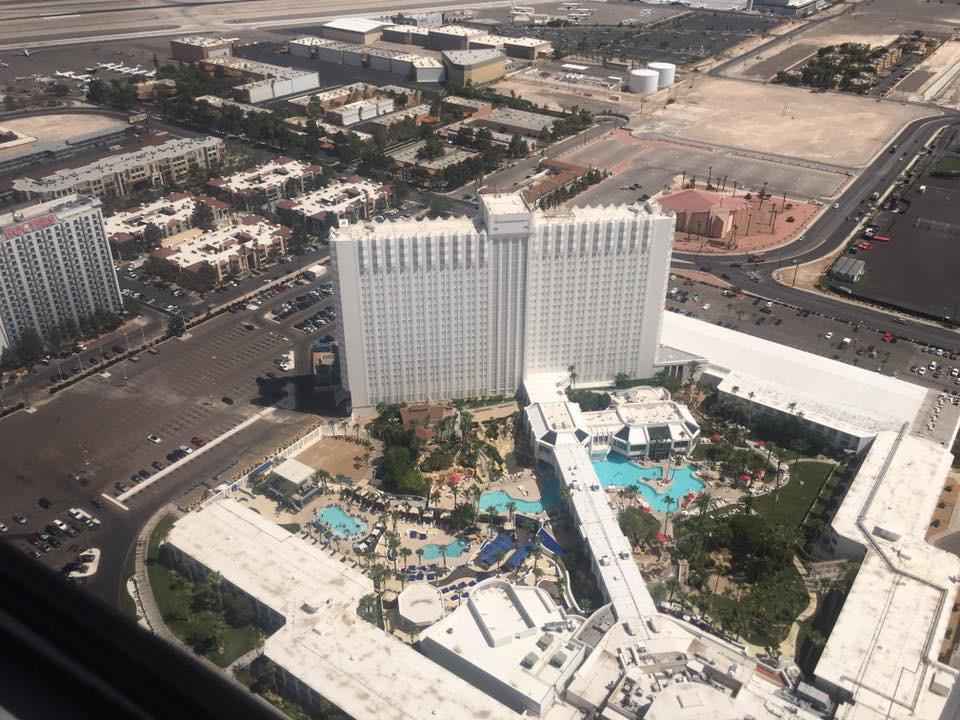
Overlooking the 1986 tower and low-rise structures in 2017

The Tropicana originally opened with a three-story hotel and 300 rooms. The resort was built out in a "Y" shape, with its two hotel wings branching outward from the casino building. A three-story wing extension with 150 rooms, designed by architect Homer Rissman, was added in 1959. Another wing was extended in 1962. A four-story addition with 132 rooms, also by Rissman, was added in 1964. Two major hotel expansions would later occur:

- The Tiffany Tower opened in 1979, with 600 rooms. It was renamed the Paradise Tower in 1986.
- The Island Tower opened in 1986, with 806 rooms. It later became the Club Tower.

The first and second towers are designated as 22 and 21 stories respectively, although both skip the 13th floor due to bad-luck superstition among gamblers.

As part of the 2010 renovation, the resort demolished its 1959 and 1964 wings, the latter to make way for a second entrance and additional parking along Tropicana Avenue. The 20th floor of the Paradise Tower was also renovated to include 6 luxury villas, removing 30 regular rooms in the process. As a result of these changes, the hotel was left with 1,467 rooms in total, down from approximately 1,870.

From 2012 until it closed in 2024, the Tropicana's hotel had been affiliated with DoubleTree by Hilton.

=== Dining ===
A $5 million remodeling project was launched in 1978, and included two new restaurants. Others would debut in the late 1990s, including the Savanna Steakhouse. The Tropicana also opened Pietro's, a fine-dining restaurant that would go on to be well received. It eventually closed in 2007 under the resort's new ownership, which found it to be under-performing.

The 2010 renovation added several new dining options, including the Italian restaurant Bacio. Legends Steak & Seafood, a 4,000 sq ft (370 m^{2}) restaurant, was updated to become Biscayne Steak, Sea & Wine. In 2017, it was remodeled again to include a bar and lounge. That year, celebrity chef Robert Irvine opened a restaurant, Robert Irvine's Public House, and the resort also added Oakville Steakhouse.

=== Museums and exhibits ===
From 1999 to 2005, the Tropicana was the home of the Casino Legends Hall of Fame. It displayed artifacts and memorabilia from hundreds of casinos, and held induction ceremonies to honor notable Las Vegas entertainers and gaming industry figures. The 5,000 sq ft (460 m^{2}) facility featured 10,000 items. Upon closing, it was quickly replaced by the Las Vegas Historic Museum, which lasted until 2006.

Convention and exhibit space was added in 1973, and an expansion was completed in 2015. The space hosted several exhibits, including "Titanic: The Artifact Exhibition", which opened in 2005. It was joined in 2006 by "Bodies: The Exhibition", a display of preserved human bodies. The two exhibits, both produced by Premier Exhibitions, closed in 2008 to move to the Luxor.

They were replaced in March 2011 by the Las Vegas Mob Experience, an attraction describing the rise and fall of organized crime in Las Vegas, featuring mob artifacts, holograms of famed gangsters such as Bugsy Siegel and Meyer Lansky, and live actors. After being plagued by technical problems, litigation, and low ticket sales, and going through a bankruptcy and partial closure, the exhibit became known as the Mob Attraction Las Vegas in March 2012. It closed in November 2013.

=== Plaza area ===
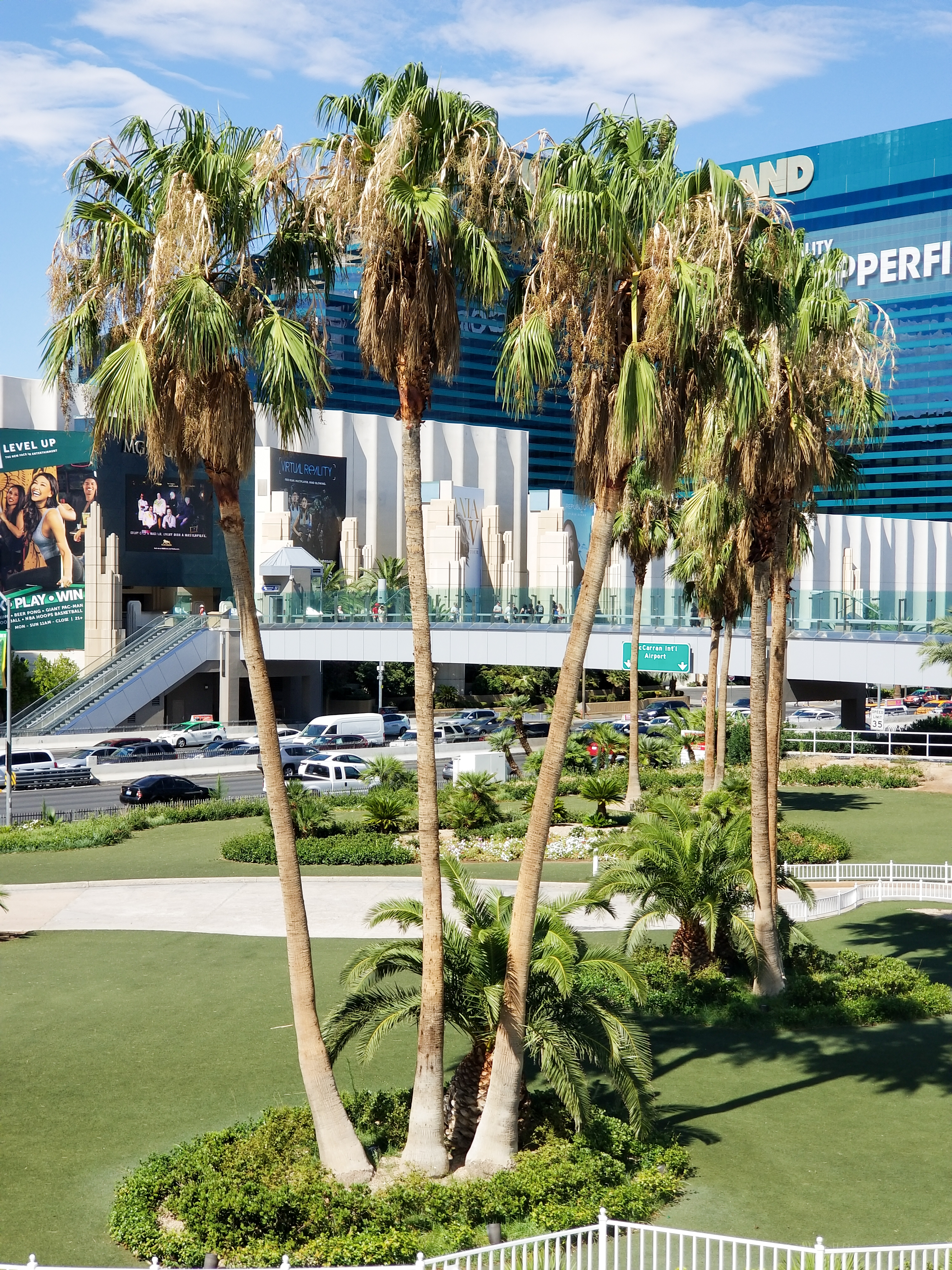
A portion of the plaza area in 2018

A plaza with tropical landscaping was located at the Tropicana – Las Vegas intersection, in front of the resort and facing the Strip. This area originally featured a water cooling tower, which was covered with a tulip-shaped fountain structure. It stood 60 feet (18 m), and was demolished in 1977, as part of renovation work.

The tropical theme was added in 1991, and included two large statues depicting Easter Island heads. The statues were 35 feet (11 m) high and weighed 300,000 pounds each. They were removed in 1996, during a renovation.

The plaza's tropical theme was expanded with a Caribbean village facade, which began construction in 1993 and was finished within a year. In 1994, the plaza debuted a free laser light show, accompanied by music and special effects such as fog. Plans were announced in 2013 to build a two-story shopping area on the plaza land, but this project was later scrapped.

=== Tropicana Country Club ===
The Tropicana Country Club opened in September 1961, on 125 acres (51 ha) of land. It was located north of the resort, across Tropicana Avenue. The site had consisted of vacant desert land, which was transformed into the golf club over a 10-month period. It included a 70-par course measuring 6,481 yards.

MGM Grand Inc. purchased the country club in 1989, and closed it a year later. The land was redeveloped as the MGM Grand resort and MGM Grand Adventures theme park, both opened in 1993.

== Live entertainment ==
The Tropicana opened with the 450-seat Theatre Restaurant, featuring tiered flooring which overlooked a semi-circular stage. It also included glass walls offering a view of the property's tropical gardens. The venue opened with singer Eddie Fisher, who was a regular performer there. In 1980, it became the first ever theater in the Las Vegas Strip to host a televised show, being Las Vegas Gambit, which was treated as both a game show and entertainment spot which was unique to the Tropicana.

Other venues included the Showcase and Blue Room lounges. Jazz performances took place in the latter, which opened in 1965. The Blue Room seated more than 400 people. Notable performers there included Louis Armstrong, Erroll Garner, Benny Goodman, Al Hirt and the Ramsey Lewis Trio.

The Tropicana Holiday, a striptease revue starring Jayne Mansfield, opened in 1958. Later that year, the Stardust resort opened on the Strip along with the show Lido de Paris, featuring topless showgirls. Inspired by the show's success, the Tropicana debuted its own topless revue in 1959, titled Folies Bergere. The show was imported from Paris. Aside from the showgirls, Folies Bergere also featured other acts, including the Las Vegas debut of magicians Siegfried & Roy (1967) and Lance Burton (1982). The show ran at the Tropicana until 2009, closing shortly before its 50th anniversary. As of 2023, it remains the longest-running show in Las Vegas history.

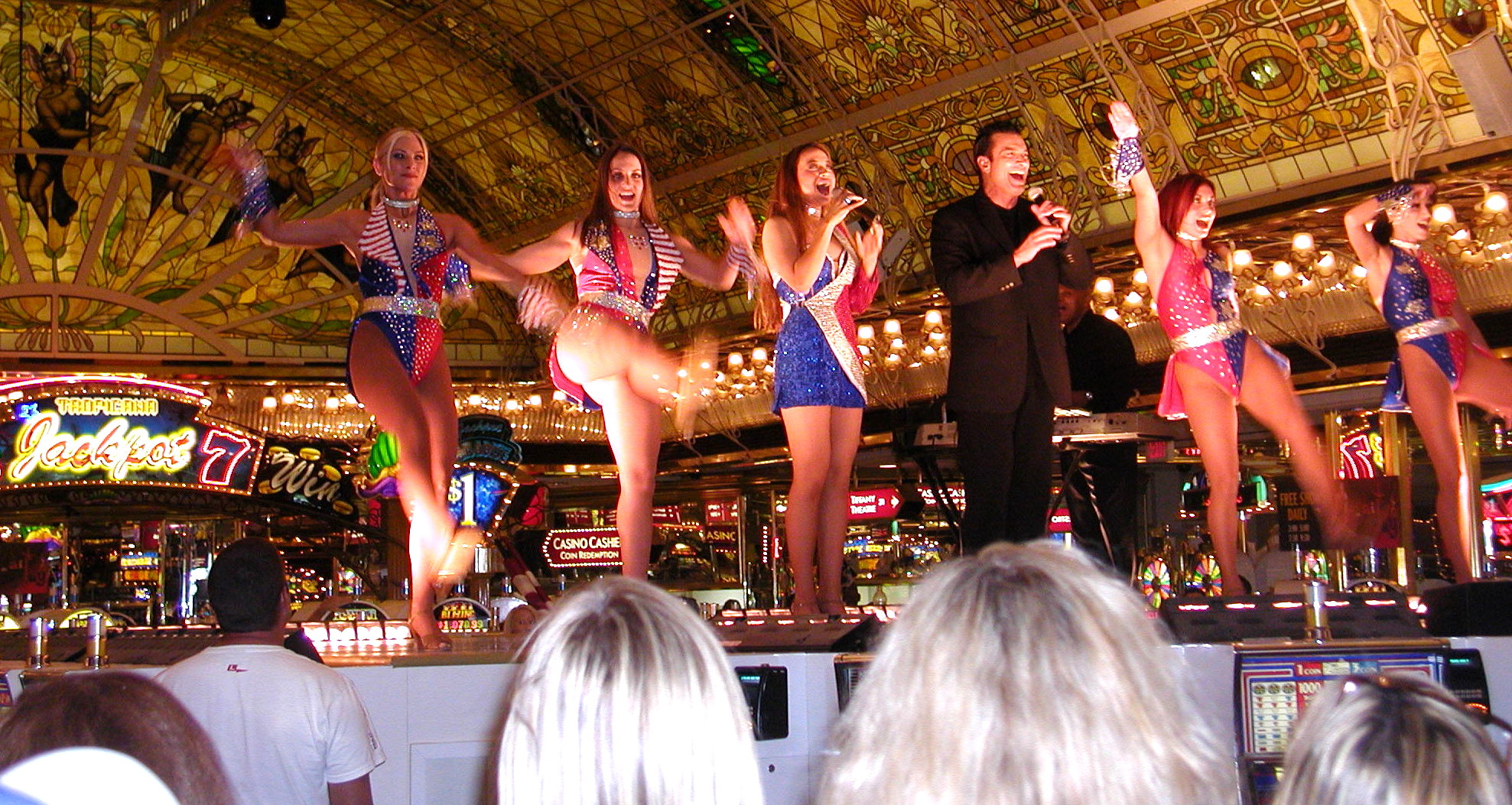
A performance of Air Play in 2003

Several live albums were recorded at the Tropicana, including Kenton Live from the Las Vegas Tropicana (1959) by Stan Kenton, Jackpot! (1966) by Dave Brubeck, Standing Ovation (1969) by Count Basie, Keep the Customer Satisfied (1970) by the Buddy Rich Big Band, and America! America! America! (1978) by Pink Lady.

In 2002, the casino floor debuted Air Play, a free show performed several times daily. It featured various entertainers – including jugglers, singers and dancers – who performed on a stage atop a bank of slot machines, with the casino's stained-glass ceiling as a backdrop. As part of the show, a track was also installed along the ceiling for acrobatic performances.

=== Main theater ===
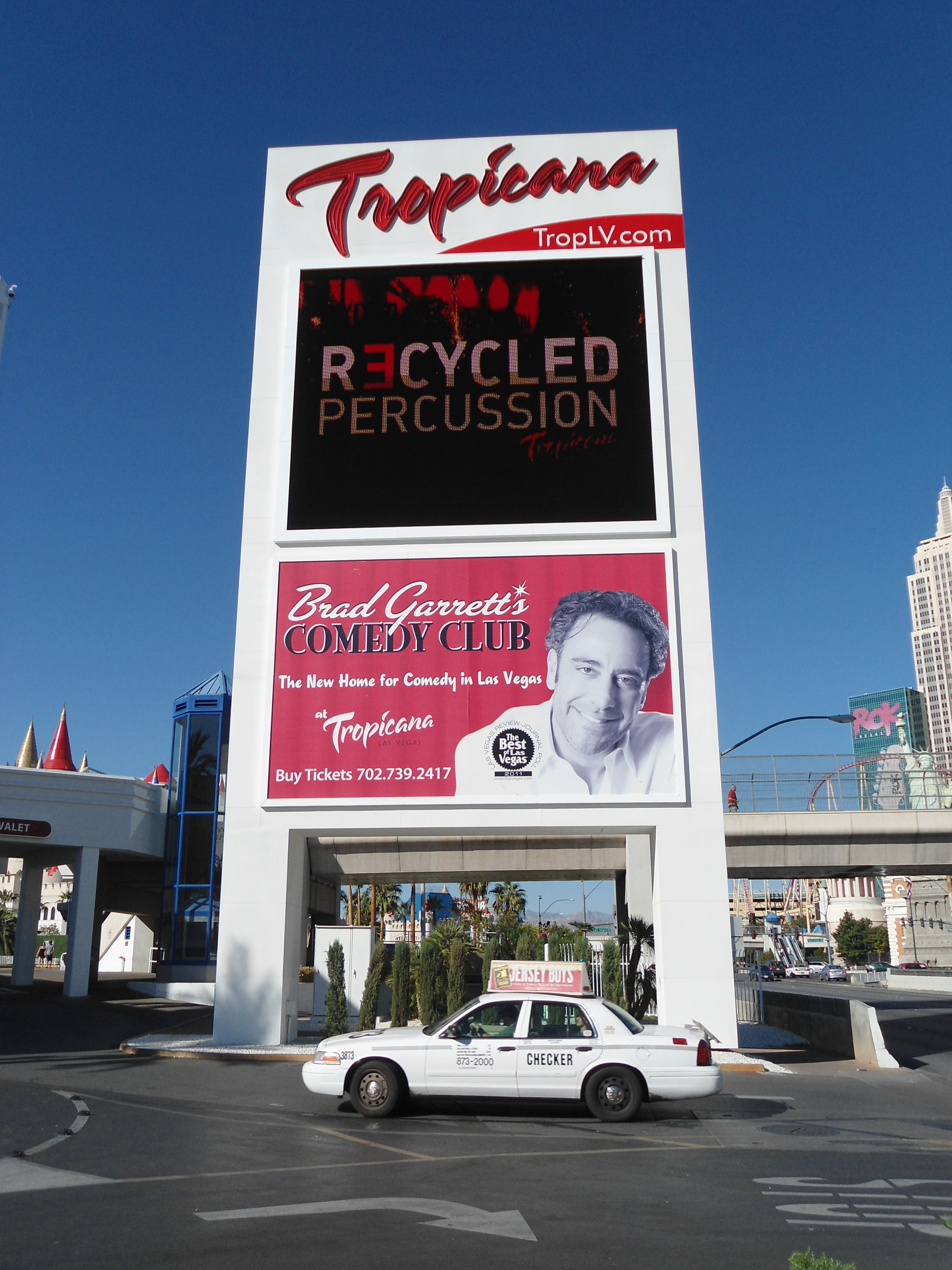
Sign along Tropicana Avenue, advertising the resort's entertainment offerings in 2011

The largest venue at the property was the 1,100-seat Tropicana Theater, which featured the Prince tribute show Purple Reign (since 2017) and the Michael Jackson tribute show MJ Live (since 2022). The venue opened in 1973 as the Superstar Theater, built to the specifications desired by Sammy Davis Jr. It was renamed as the Tiffany Theatre in 1975. In 2011, it became the Gladys Knight Theater when the singer began a residency at the venue. It was renamed as the Tropicana Theater later that year, after Knight's departure. From 2019 to 2022, it hosted the celebrity impersonator revue Legends in Concert and was named the Legends in Concert Theater.

Other productions at the theater have included magician Rick Thomas (1997–2005); magician Dirk Arthur (2005–2010); singer Wayne Newton (2009–2010); percussion group Recycled Percussion (2010–2012); a live production of Dancing with the Stars (2012); Mamma Mia!, the Broadway musical based on the songs of ABBA (2014); Raiding the Rock Vault, a musical featuring classic rock songs (2014–2016); illusionist Jan Rouven (2014–2016); and illusionist David Goldrake (2017–2018).

=== Comedy clubs ===
A showroom on the Tropicana's mezzanine level was occupied by the Laugh Factory, a comedy club which offered two nightly stand-up comedy shows, as well as nightly performances by impressionist Rich Little and comic magician Murray Sawchuck. The space opened in 1988 as Rodney's Place, a comedy club associated with Rodney Dangerfield, which closed after six months. It then operated as the Comedy Stop from 1990 to 2009. The venue next became the Bobby Slayton Room, offering regular shows by the comedian and several other performers. It then opened as Brad Garrett's Comedy Club in 2010. Garrett's club departed in 2011 to move to the MGM Grand. The Laugh Factory took over the space in 2012, and continued there until the Tropicana closed in 2024. The Laugh Factory intends to relocate to a new yet-to-be-determined location on the Strip.

== In popular culture ==
The Tropicana made various appearances in popular culture, including films:

- A scene from Folies Bergere is featured in the 1964 Elvis Presley film Viva Las Vegas.
- In the 1971 James Bond film Diamonds Are Forever, 007 stays at the Tropicana, because he has heard it is "quite comfortable".
- The Las Vegas sequence of The Godfather (1972) was filmed at the resort.
- Filming took place at the Tropicana for the 1992 film This Is My Life, while a coffee shop at the resort was recreated on a sound stage for additional filming.

The Tropicana was also featured in television programs:

- The resort was a filming location for a 1978 episode of Charlie's Angels titled "Angels in Vegas".
- A two-part episode of Designing Women, aired in 1992 during season seven, was set at the Tropicana. In the episodes, Anthony meets and marries a showgirl from Folies Bergere.
- In 1998, stunt performer Robbie Knievel jumped a motorcycle across 30 limousines at the Tropicana, for a live two-hour special titled Daredevils Live: Shattering the Records.
- An episode of Seven Days filmed at the Tropicana in 1999.
- The Tropicana was featured on the TV show Angel in the 2002 episode "The House Always Wins", as the casino where the character Lorne had his show.
- The fifth-season premiere of Malcolm in the Middle was filmed at the Tropicana in 2003.

The Tropicana was also used for the taping of several game shows, including Dealer's Choice (1974) and Las Vegas Gambit (1980–81). Let's Make a Deal was revived in 2009, with half of its first season taped at the resort, before moving to Los Angeles.

== See also ==
- Tropicana Atlantic City
- Tropicana Laughlin
