= Chelsea Hotel (Atlantic City, New Jersey) =

Hotel in Atlantic City, New Jersey, US

The Chelsea

General information
- Location: Atlantic City, New Jersey, 111 S Chelsea Ave
- Coordinates: 39.3516°N 74.4474°W
- Opening: 1966, 2008
- Closed: 2017
- Owner: Tropicana Casino & Resort Atlantic City

Other information
- Number of rooms: 358

Website
- the-chelsea.atlantic-city-hotel.net/en/

The Chelsea, also known as Chelsea Hotel, was a hotel located on the Atlantic City boardwalk in Atlantic City, New Jersey. The original hotel was a 400-room Holiday Inn and a 340-room Howard Johnson which was purchased and then renovated in 2008. The property was acquired by the then Eldorado Resorts in 2017 and connected to the Tropicana Atlantic City as an additional hotel tower.

== History ==
The original Chelsea was different hotel in a different location near the Atlantic City shore. The original hotel was opened in 1899 and had 250 rooms. It hosted distinguished guests including William Howard Taft, Woodrow Wilson and Franklin D. Roosevelt. In 1927, twelve stories were added to the hotel. In 1942, during World War II, the hotel was used as housing for army personnel. The hotel would eventually be renamed to Sheraton-Deauville. In 1975, a fire broke out at the Sheraton-Deauville which caused $250,000 in damages and forced the evacuation of 300 guests.

Between 1966 and 1968 seven national hotel chains expanded into Atlantic City. Among them was the "400-room Holiday Inn and 340-room Howard Johnson" which in 2008 would be renamed and become the current Chelsea Hotel. During this time, the original Chelsea then renamed Deauville was again renamed to Sheraton-Deauville.

In 1981, the Tropicana Casino & Resort Atlantic City opened. By the mid-1980s the Tropicana demolished the Sheraton-Deauville to open TropWorld, an amusement center which included a three-story ferris wheel.

In 2008, the Holiday Inn and Howard Johnson was remodeled and opened as The Chelsea after undergoing $100 million in renovation costs. The hotel does not have a casino. The Chelsea closed again in December 2016 after a gaming legalization deal for the hotel collapsed. In 2017, Tropicana Casino purchased the hotel after Carl Icahn purchased The Chelsea's mortgage. The Tropicana built a skyway connecting The Chelsea to the Tropicana. The new property is called "The Chelsea Tower at Tropicana Atlantic City" or simply "Chelsea Tower". The Chelsea reopened in the summer of 2018.

== Hotel ==
The Chelsea is divided into two sections: "the Luxe Tower in the Holiday Inn" building and the "Annex in the Howard Johnson" building. The Luxe rooms contain "animal-print chairs, large desks as white as disco boots and a pair of cockatoo-shaped lamps at bedsides". The hotel offers restaurants such as Chelsea Prime and Teplitzky's deli. The hotel has 358 rooms and has been described by Andrea Sachs as having "an old soul, adopting the history of its buildings' former occupants, the Holiday Inn Atlantic City-Boardwalk and the Howard Johnson". It is two blocks from Tropicana and 2.9 km from the Atlantic City Historical Museum.

As of 2018, the Chelsea Tower has restaurants such as the "Chelsea Five Gastropub, Whiskey Five Bar and Gilchrist’s famous hot cakes". The hotel reopened in summer 2018 and cost $200 million to renovate. The hotel has a ground level pool called Oasis and a rooftop pool and bar called the Cabana Five Bar & Pool Deck.
