= Tropicana Atlantic City =

Hotel and casino in Atlantic City, New Jersey

Coordinates: 39.3523°N 74.4456°W

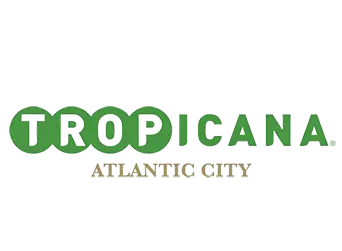

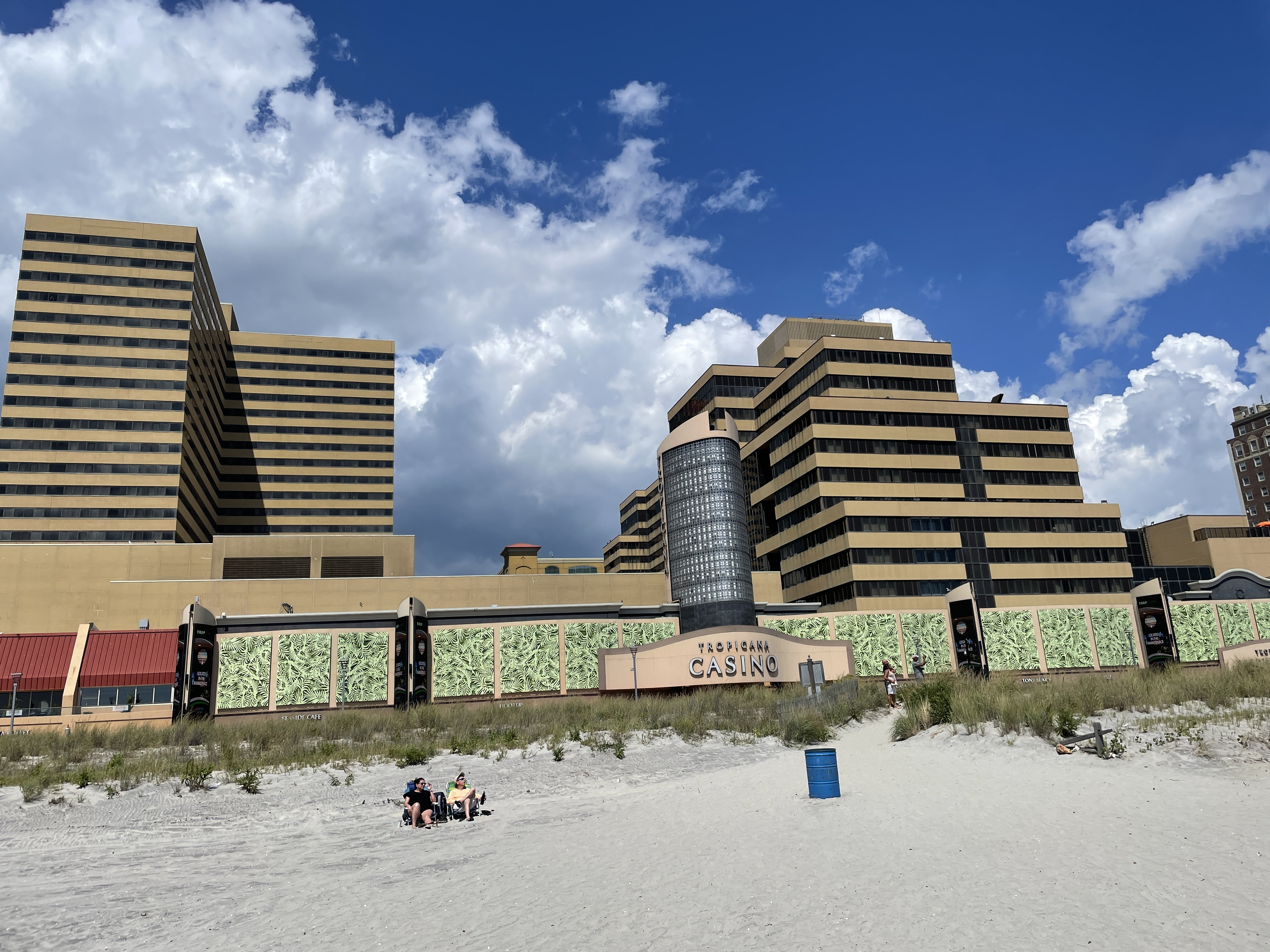
- View of Tropicana from the beach
- Interactive map of Tropicana Atlantic City
- Location: Atlantic City, New Jersey; 2831 Boardwalk
- Opened: November 23, 1981; 44 years ago
- Theme: Old Havana, Modernism (Rooms)
- No. of rooms: 2,364
- Gaming space: 130,000 sq ft (12,000 m^{2})
- Permanent shows: Various
- Signature attractions: The Quarter, IMAX, Two Arcades, Free Multi-Media Light And Sound Show, High Limit Slot Section
- Notable restaurants: Carmine's; The Palm; Chelsea Five; iL Verdi; Cuba Libre Restaurant & Rum Bar; A Dam Good Deli; A Dam Good Sports Bar; Häagen-Dazs; Broadway Burger Bar; Casa Taco & Tequila; Chickie's & Pete's; Hooters; Mrs. Fields; Perry's Pizza; P. F. Chang's China Bistro; Starbucks (2); Tony Luke's; Whiskey Five Bar; Zeytinia; Pizata
- Casino type: Land-based
- Owner: Gaming & Leisure Properties Inc.
- Operating license holder: Caesars Entertainment
- Architect: Various, SOSH Architects (Renovations)
- Previous names: TropWorld Casino And Entertainment Resort
- Renovated in: 1988, 1989, 1996, 2003, 2004, 2007, 2008, 2012, 2013, 2014, 2015, 2016, 2017, 2018, 2021–2022 (West Tower plans in progress), 2021–2023 (Caesars Entertainment Planned Projects) 2025-2026 (Solana Tower Renovations)
- Website: tropicana.net

The Tropicana Atlantic City, often referred to as The Trop, is a resort, casino hotel located on the Boardwalk in Atlantic City, New Jersey. It is owned by Gaming and Leisure Properties and operated by Caesars Entertainment, and is the largest hotel in New Jersey, with just under 2,400 guest rooms and the 200,000-square-foot shopping and entertainment complex, The Quarter. It has over 30 restaurants, 30 shops, 20 bars and lounges, 4 pools, the Tropicana North Tower Showroom, spa and an IMAX Theatre. In 2016, Tropicana completed over $200 million in renovations and additions, including a Multimedia Light and Sound Show, the addition of AtlantiCare LifeCenter Fitness (now Tilton Fitness), Garces restaurants, renovations to over 900 hotel rooms, and casino floor but Tropicana will continue investing. The Tropicana is the largest resort and casino on the boardwalk, with 2,364 rooms, 3,000 slot machines, 30 restaurants, and 30 shops, along with two 2,500-space parking garages, totaling over 5,000 parking spaces. In 2021-2023 Tropicana is said to complete renovations through these years, the renovations will include renovations to all 604 Solana Tower rooms, modernized elevators and escalators, pool enhancements, gaming space enhancements, and more undisclosed renovation projects.

== History ==
=== The Ambassador Hotel (1919–1977) ===
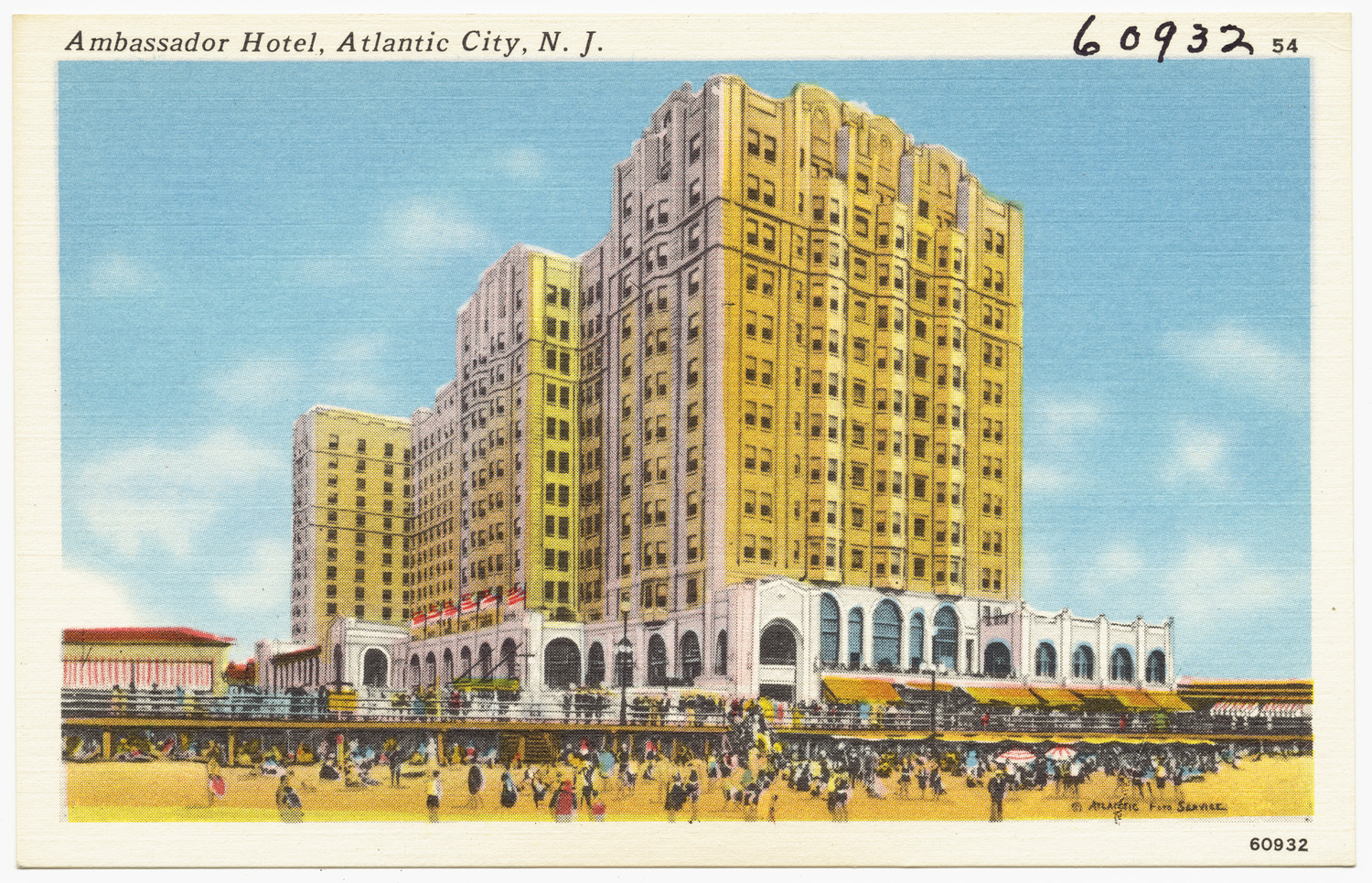
The Ambassador Hotel, 1930s

The Ambassador Hotel, designed by Warren & Wetmore was built in 1919, at a cost of $4 million. It contained 400 rooms, and was soon expanded with a second tower adding another 400 rooms in 1921.

On June 18, 1922, Sir Arthur Conan Doyle and his friend Harry Houdini met at the hotel, for Doyle's spiritualist wife Anna to contact Houdini's late mother in a seance. Although Anna transcribed pages of notes allegedly from her, Houdini later revealed that his mother did not speak English, claimed Doyle's wife was a fraud, and ended his friendship with Conan Doyle.

In 1929, the Ambassador was the site of the infamous Atlantic City Conference, in which a number of organized crime bosses, including Al Capone, Meyer Lansky and Lucky Luciano, negotiated their territorial rights after a wave of violence.

In 1931, as Philadelphia gangster Mickey Duffy slept in the hotel, he was shot and killed by assailants who were never caught. The incident was dramatized in the series Boardwalk Empire, with a character called Mieczyslaw "Mickey Doyle" Kuzik.

The hotel eventually closed in the 1970s.

=== The Phoenix (1978–1980) ===
In 1978, Ramada purchased the derelict Ambassador Hotel building for $35 million, planning to renovate the property and convert it at a further cost of $70 million into The Phoenix, a 549-room hotel and 60,000-square-foot (5,600 m^{2}) casino with amenities including a 1,200-seat theater and a 1,000-seat ballroom. They planned an additional newly built 1000-room hotel adjacent, should The Phoenix be successful.

Executives at Ramada were forced to alter their plans when their design was denied by the New Jersey Casino Control Commission and Governor Brendan Byrne, as both did not want casino operators doing "patch and paint" jobs, instead they preferred the companies building new properties from the ground up. Ramada was ordered to demolish the former hotel and start from the ground up, but the company threatened to appeal the decision in court as Resorts International, the Claridge Casino and Caesars Boardwalk Regency had all been allowed to open in existing structures. Finally, an agreement was reached to only reuse the steel framework of the old Ambassador building, and construction began in October 1979.

=== Tropicana (1981–88) ===
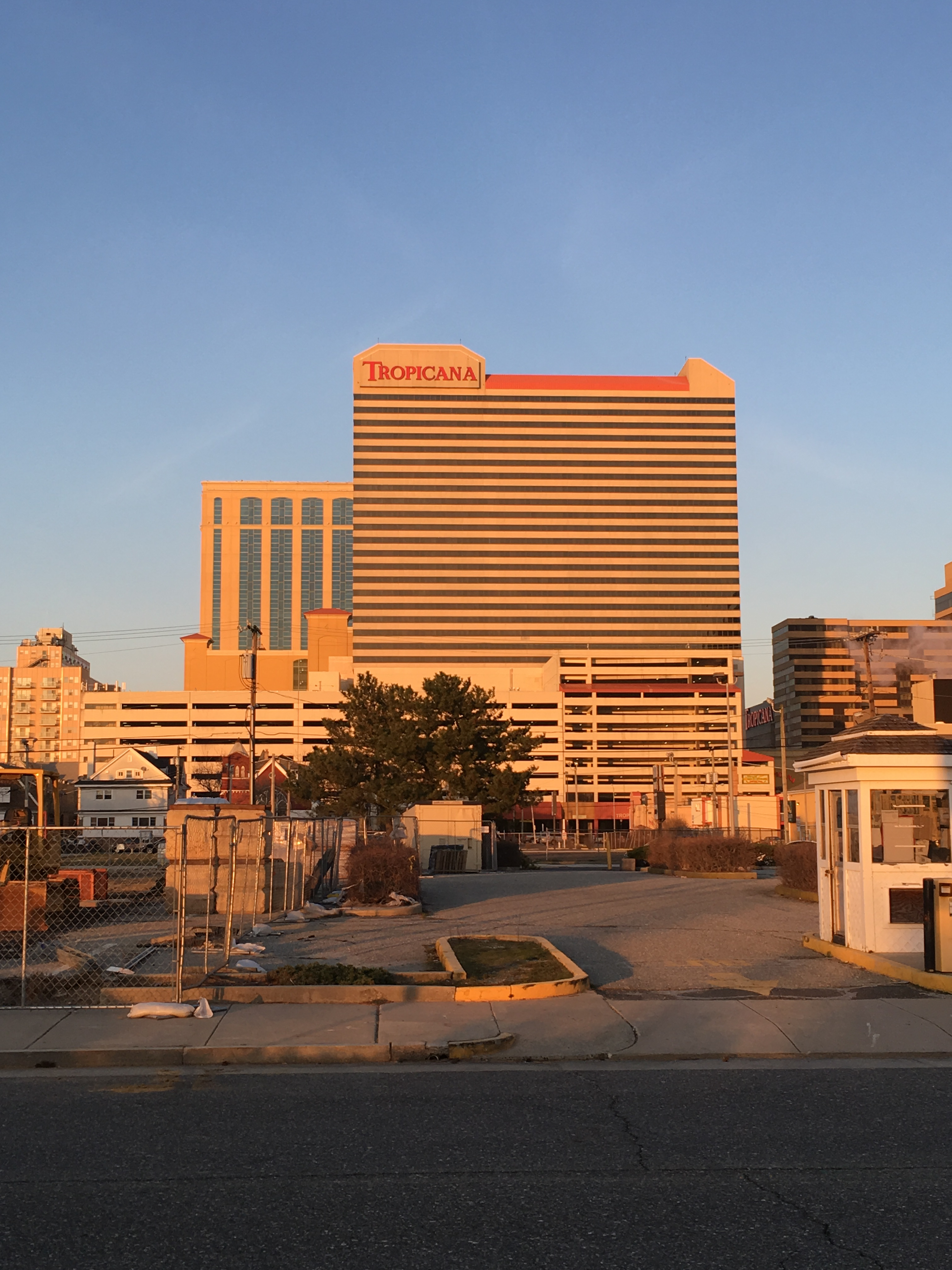
Exterior of the hotel at Tropicana, 2016

After Ramada bought the Tropicana Resort & Casino on the Las Vegas Strip in December 1979 for $70 million, company officials decided to call their new East Coast property Tropicana Atlantic City, as the Tropicana name was already well known in the casino industry. Tropicana Atlantic City officially opened on November 23, 1981, with 521 guest rooms and a large casino. In May 1985, a 1700-seat showroom was added with Wayne Newton serving as the opening act. Other acts have included Patti LaBelle, Jay Leno, Dionne Warwick, The Smothers Brothers, Tom Jones and Tony Bennett.

=== TropWorld Resort (1988–95) ===
In 1988 the property underwent an expansion, with another tower (South Tower) being added as well as the addition of an indoor amusement center called Tivoli Pier. The resort was renamed TropWorld Casino and Entertainment Resort.

In 1989, Ramada hotels split their gaming properties into the Aztar Corporation, and the new division focused much of its projects on the Atlantic City property, which led to the eventual sale of the Las Vegas Tropicana.

=== Tropicana (1996–present) ===
Aztar constructed a new 604-room hotel tower (West Tower) as well as renovations to the existing rooms and casino space in 1995 and 1996. Tivoli Pier was closed during the casino expansions to make way for a new poker, keno and horse racing simulcast area. With the closing of the amusement area, the resort was renamed Tropicana Casino & Resort Atlantic City.

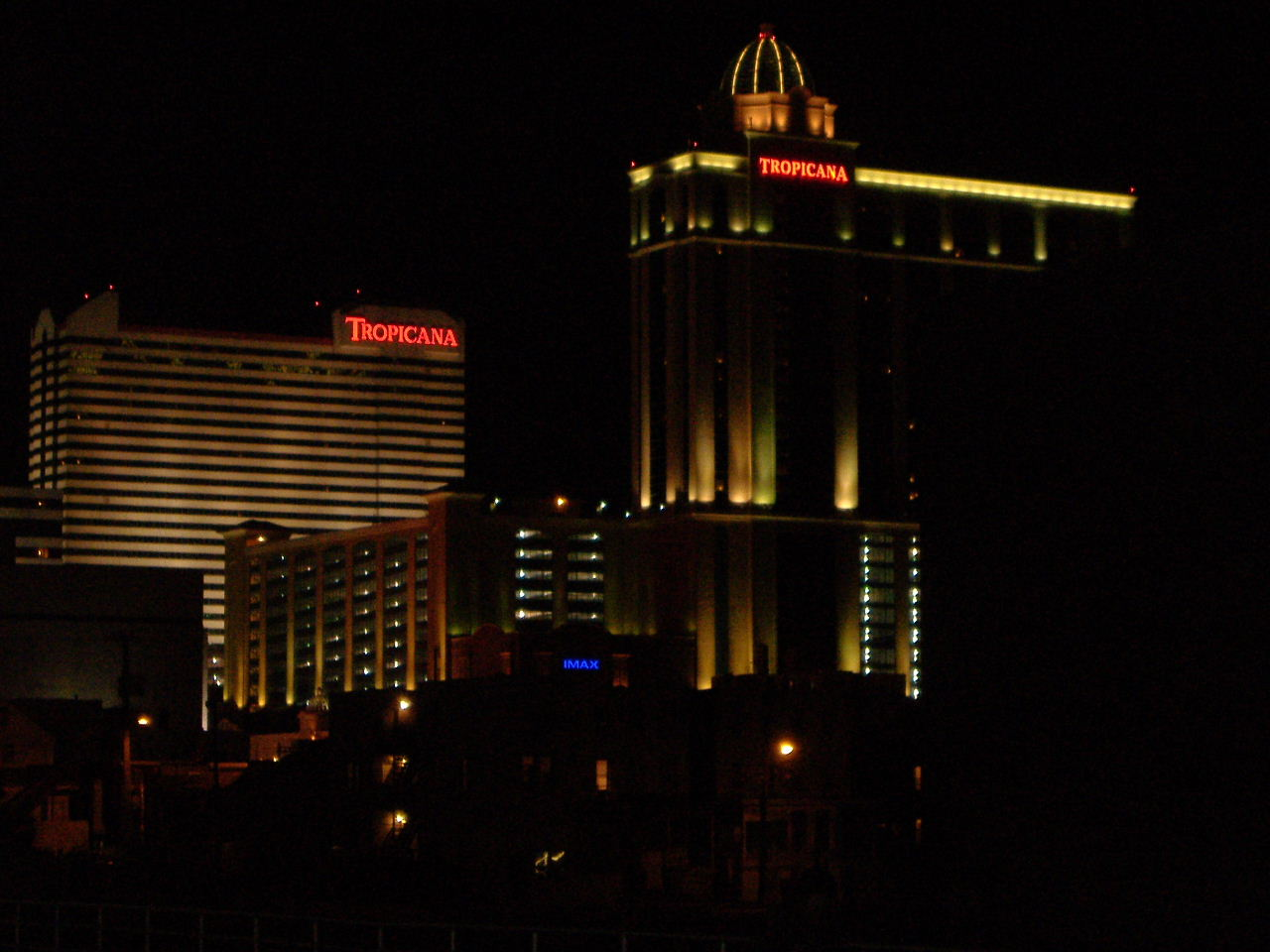
Tropicana at night

Aztar then followed this expansion with another one in 2003 and 2004 that added a 502-room tower (Havana Tower), a 2,400-space parking garage, 22,000 square feet (2,000 m^{2}) of meeting and convention space, and The Quarter at Tropicana, a shopping mall designed in an old Havana theme. The goal of this project was to turn the Tropicana into an integrated casino resort reminiscent of the megaresorts built in Las Vegas during the 1990s, and also to compete with the Borgata, another Las Vegas megaresort-style casino opened in the city in 2003. Guests can not stay in the old West Tower/Casino parking garage, the old parking garage was then restricted to Seven Star Card Level Holders Only.

On October 30th, 2003 at 10:40am the parking structure would collapse, killing four and injuring 32, thanks to cost and time saving shortcuts by the builder (Fabi Construction LLC) that proved to be too essential to eliminate. Ultimately the garage would be rebuilt. The OSHA fines were eventually reduced to less than $10,000, a settlement of $101M was divided between the injured victims, and another undisclosed settlement for the four families of the deceased .

In January 2007, the Aztar Corporation was acquired by Columbia Sussex for $2.75 billion. The New Jersey Casino Control Commission granted Columbia Sussex an Interim Authorization to operate the resort on November 3, 2006. The acquisition concluded in January 2007 with the Aztar properties being merged into Columbia Sussex's gaming subsidiary, which was renamed Tropicana Entertainment LLC. In the first four months after the acquisition, Columbia Sussex reduced the number of employees at the Tropicana by 15 percent.

On November 20, 2007, the New Jersey Casino Control Commission initiated hearings for the renewal of the casino license of Tropicana and whether its parent companies, Adamar of New Jersey and Columbia Sussex, were suitable to hold a casino license. On December 12, 2007, the Casino Control Commission denied the application of renewal for Tropicana. The commission cited the management's "abysmal" regulatory compliance as well as a "lack of business ability... financial responsibility... and a lack of good character, honesty, and integrity." The property was immediately placed under the control of a trustee, former New Jersey State Supreme Court Justice Gary Stein, until it could be sold. This was only the second time in twenty-nine years that the commission denied a license renewal. Lawyers were expected to appeal.

In 2008, a West Tower elevator malfunctioned after 21 individuals boarded it. The elevator plummeted 14 floors at 750 feet per minute due to unbalanced counterweights. It failed to stop at the lobby and landed on the safety buffer in the elevator pit. Some passengers were injured; the most severe injury was a dislocated knee requiring reconstructive surgery. Some of the passengers filed a lawsuit against Tropicana, Motion Control Elevators, Columbia Sussex, and Otis. Otis, the maintenance company for the elevators at the time, took full responsibility and leveled the counterweights and fixed the safety systems in all 4 West Tower elevators.

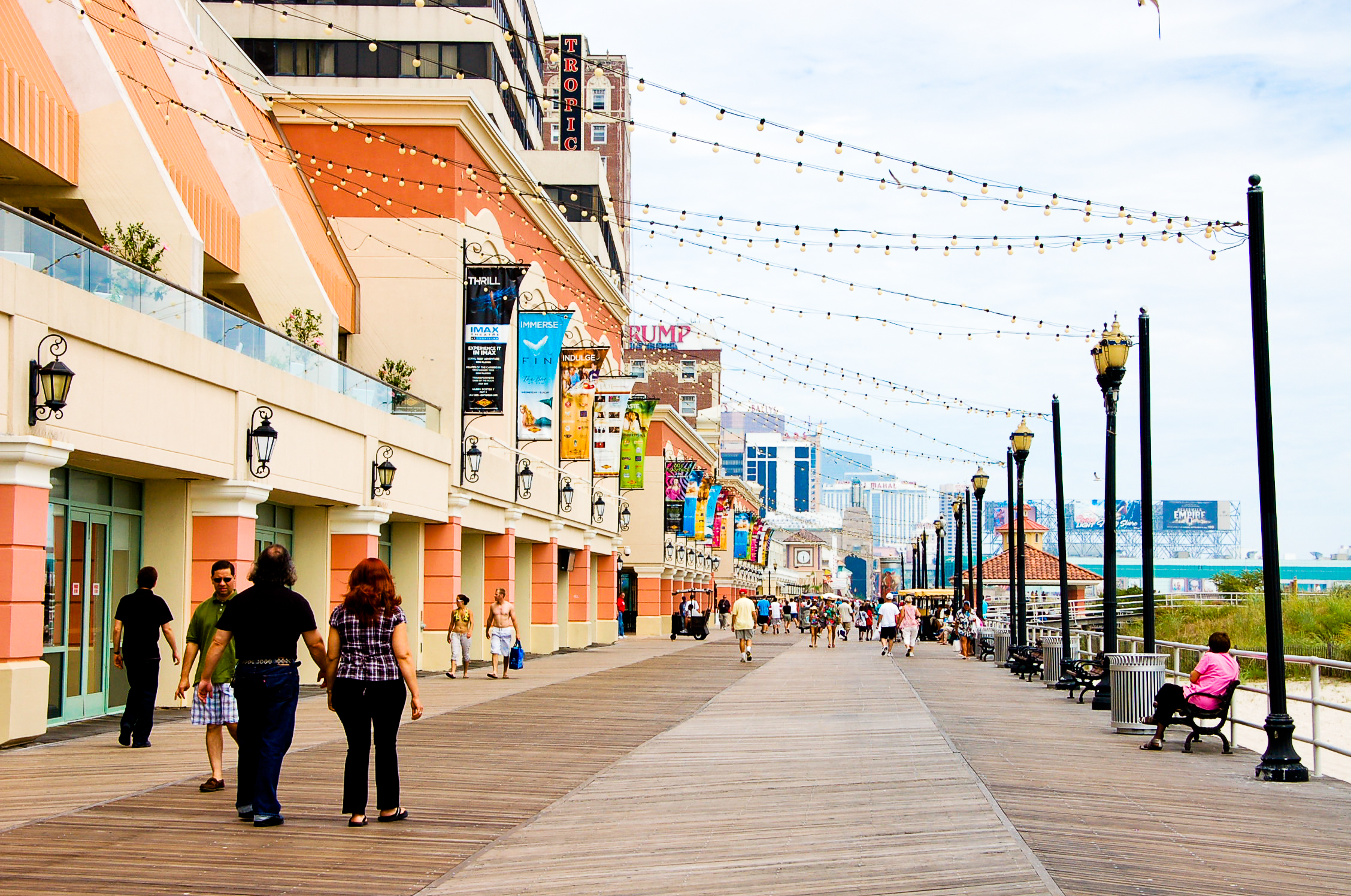
The boardwalk outside of the resort

The bankruptcy sale of the Tropicana Casino and Resort to a group of creditors led by Carl Icahn was approved by a bankruptcy court on June 12, 2009. The acquisition exchanged $200 million of the property's mortgage for equity. On August 26, 2009, the New Jersey Casino Control Commission approved Tropicana Entertainment Inc. as the property's new owner. The Commission stressed that the new owner is not the same company as the former owner, Tropicana Entertainment LLC. The decision enabled the property to operate under the same corporate umbrella as other Tropicana properties in Nevada, Mississippi, Louisiana and Indiana. Tropicana Entertainment Inc. was granted a temporary casino license by the Commission on March 3, 2010. The sale closed on March 8, 2010.

By 2010, The Tropicana has fallen into disrepair, Tropicana Entertainment now owned by Icahn Enterprises (Tropicana was later bought by Caesars Entertainment) invested money into the establishment. The first West Tower Renovation was done in 2012, and the North Tower was renovated in 2014–2015. Most of the Tropicana was renovated in 2015, including a new façade, new painting to the North, Havana, and South Tower, and renovations to the casino floor and over 900 hotel rooms.

In 2018, Gaming and Leisure Properties (GLP) acquired the real estate of the Tropicana and Eldorado Resorts (later Caesars Entertainment) acquired its operating business, under lease from GLP, as part of the two companies' acquisition of Tropicana Entertainment. The Chelsea became a part of the Tropicana, further expanding the mega-large resort and adding a skybridge to it. The South Tower in Tropicana was renovated in 2018, when the Tropicana was the second most successful hotel and casino in Atlantic City. As of 2020, Trop-Advantage is no longer available and instead, Tropicana is part of Caesars Rewards.

In 2026, The West Tower was renovated into the Solana Tower

== Gaming ==
Tropicana Atlantic City has over 3,000 slot machines and over 132 table games throughout its 125,935 square feet of gaming space. Tropicana also hosts daily poker tournaments. Tropicana Atlantic City also has a sportsbook which offers sports betting.

=== Online gaming ===
In 2006, the Unlawful Internet Gambling Enforcement Act (UIGEA) passed. The UIGEA drastically limited the ways that online gaming organizations are legally allowed to accept money. This has stunted the growth of legal, tax-paying cyber gambling businesses. Although since 2013, Tropicana Casino & Resort of Atlantic City teamed up with Governor Chris Christie and Virgin Group, backed by Sir Richard Branson, to take on the online gambling laws. Together, the team was able to legalize cyber gambling within the state of New Jersey. The law instates a 15% Internet gambling tax. New Jersey Senator Ray Lesniak said, "For our casinos and racetracks, it may be the difference between life and death. Both are dying industries."

== Dining ==
Tropicana Atlantic City has over 30 restaurants and eateries.

== Entertainment and the Tropicana North Tower Showroom ==
Tropicana is home to a 2,014-seat showroom which hosts shows as well as an IMAX Theatre. In Spring of 2015, they added a free Multimedia Light and Sound Show on its boardwalk facade. Boxing matches are held at the casino. Various other shows and events are also held at Tropicana Atlantic City. See also a list of New Jersey music venues by capacity.

== Hotel Towers ==
There are seven hotel towers in Tropicana Atlantic City:

- North Tower is the original hotel tower, opening in 1981. It is the second largest in the resort, with 521 rooms. This tower was last renovated in 2014-2015.
- South Tower was built in 1989 and added 379 rooms to the hotel. Its rooms were last renovated in 2018.
- Solana Tower (former West Tower) is the largest tower in Tropicana, containing 604 rooms. It was built in 1996 by Aztar Corporation and was renovated and rebranded as the Solana Tower in 2026.
- Havana Tower opened as part of the 2003 expansion and contains 502 rooms. It was last renovated in 2016.
- Chelsea Tower is the smallest tower in Tropicana with 358 rooms. This, along with the Annex Tower was originally the Chelsea Hotel. In 2018, Caesars Entertainment acquired the property and connected it to the Tropicana via skybridge.
- Annex Tower is the low-rise building in the Chelsea Tower.

Lux Tower is the low rise part of The Chelsea Tower

== The Quarter ==
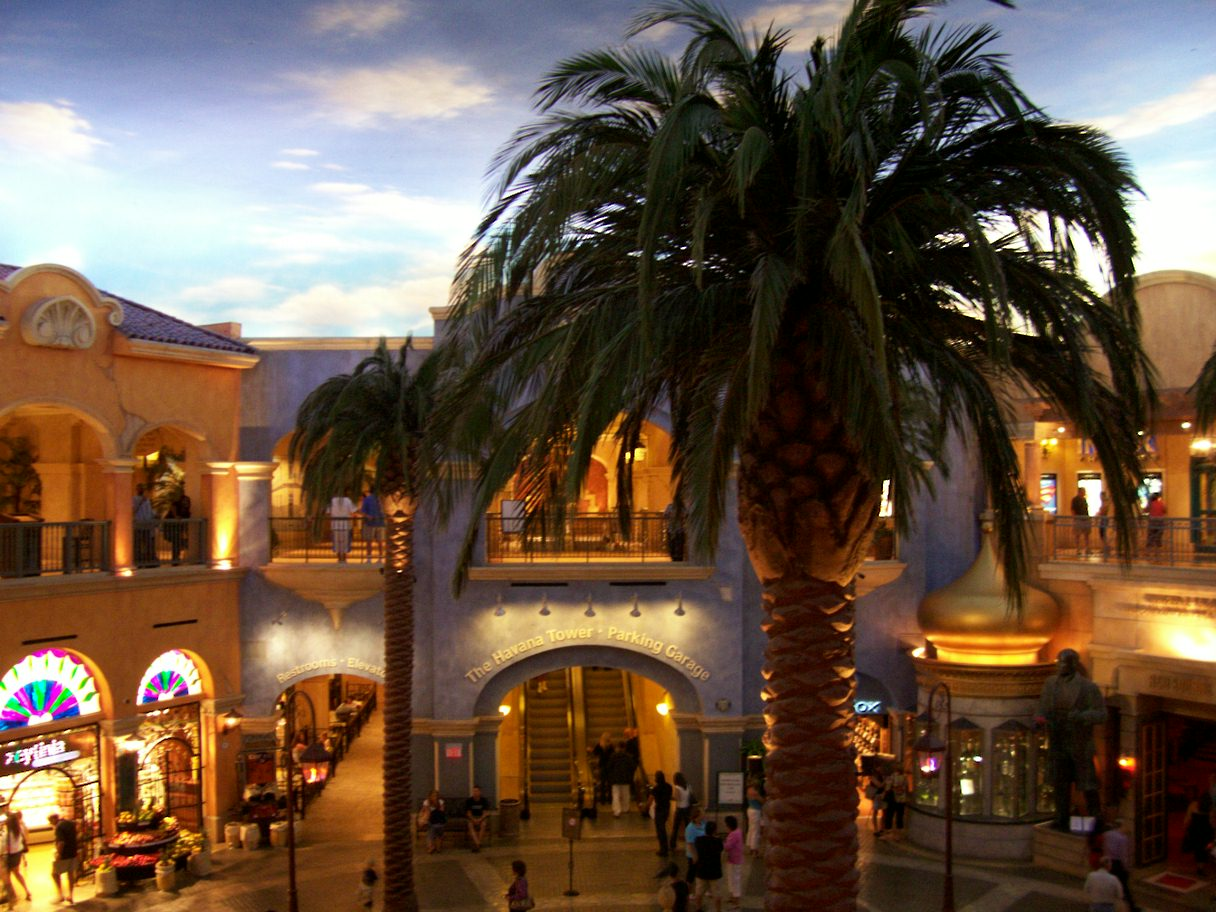
The Quarter

The Quarter at Tropicana is a dining, shopping and entertainment complex. The Quarter features nine restaurants, twenty-one shops, eight nightlife venues, The Zen Spa and the city's only movie theater, an IMAX Theater. The Quarter at the Tropicana is a Mini Shopping Mall.

== Controversies ==
A major controversy involving expansion of the resort occurred in 1995 when the Tropicana Casino And Resort (then known as TropWorld Casino And Entertainment Resort), the Casino Reinvestment Development Authority, and the city attempted to acquire adjacent land owned by Joseph Milano at 1 South Brighton Avenue for a surface parking lot using eminent domain. A lawsuit was filed by Milano and his family in New Jersey Appeals Court (Milano v. Adamar of New Jersey d/b/a TropWorld Casino and Entertainment Resort, Casino Reinvestment Development Authority, City of Atlantic City, et at.) to stop the use of eminent domain. A New Jersey appeals court agreed with the Milano family and issued a restraining order preventing TropWorld and the CRDA from proceeding. As of 2014, Joseph Milano and members of his family still live in the building which was built in 1897 and purchased by his father in 1935.

On October 30, 2003, part of the Parking Garage collapsed during construction. Of the 300-400 workers at the site, over 20 were injured and 4 were found dead and five of the building's ten stories collapsed. The cause of the accident was identified as a result of a failure to provide adequate temporary supports until the concrete dried.

== See also ==
- Gambling in New Jersey
- List of tallest buildings in Atlantic City
- Tropicana Las Vegas
- Tropicana Laughlin
- List of integrated resorts
