= Tropicana Entertainment =

Casino holding company in Las Vegas, Nevada

Tropicana Entertainment Inc.
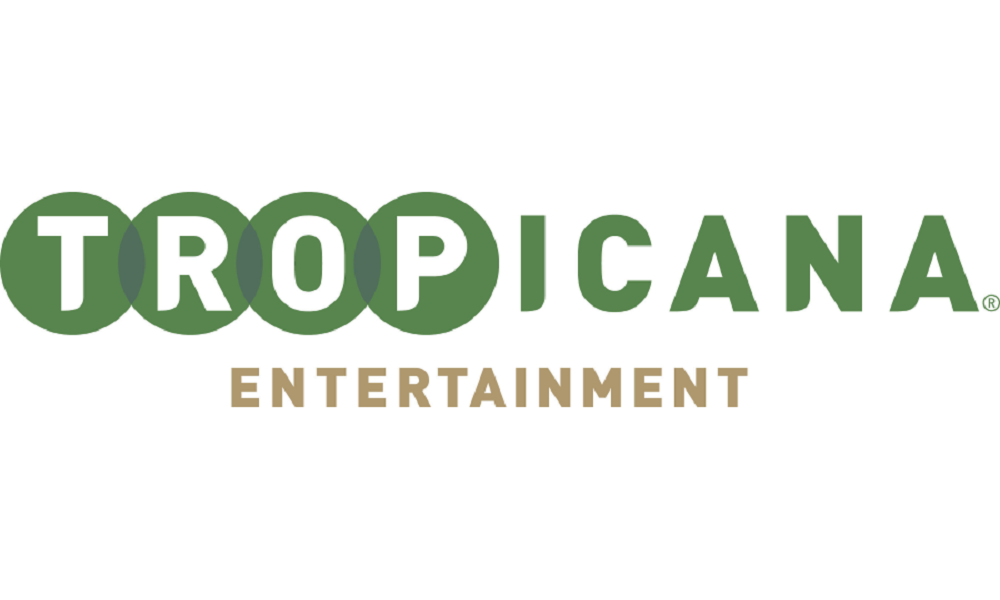
- Company type: Public
- Traded as: OTCQB: TPCA
- Industry: Gaming
- Predecessor: Tropicana Entertainment LLC; Aztar Corporation; Columbia Sussex
- Founded: March 8, 2010; 16 years ago
- Defunct: October 1, 2018; 7 years ago
- Fate: Acquired by Eldorado Resorts and Gaming and Leisure Properties
- Headquarters: Spring Valley, Nevada, U.S.

Tropicana Entertainment Inc. was a publicly traded gaming company that owned and operated casinos and resorts in Indiana, Louisiana, Mississippi, Nevada, Missouri, New Jersey. and Aruba. Tropicana properties collectively had approximately 5,500 rooms, 8,000 slot positions and 270 table games. The company was based in Spring Valley, Nevada, and was majority-owned by Icahn Enterprises. The company was acquired in 2018 by Eldorado Resorts and Gaming and Leisure Properties for $1.85 billion.

== History ==
In January 2007, Columbia Sussex acquired Aztar Corporation, owner of the Tropicana casinos in Las Vegas and Atlantic City, and three other casinos, for $2.1 billion. A new subsidiary, Tropicana Entertainment LLC, was created to hold the combined company's casinos. After losing control of its largest property, the Tropicana Atlantic City, the new company was quickly forced into bankruptcy in May 2008. While in bankruptcy, the Tropicana Las Vegas was split off as a separate entity.

The rest of the company emerged from bankruptcy on March 8, 2010, as Tropicana Entertainment Inc., under the leadership of investor Carl Icahn. On the same day, it regained control of the Tropicana Atlantic City, which Icahn and other investors had bought for $200 million in canceled debt. In approving the transfer, the Casino Control Commission stressed that Tropicana was a "different company" than the company that had lost its license in 2007.

In March 2011, Tropicana sold the Horizon Casino in Vicksburg to a partnership of Tangent Gaming and Great Southern Investment Group, who renamed it as the Grand Station Hotel and Casino.

In 2012, the company closed the Jubilee casino and consolidated its operations into the Lighthouse Point casino, which was expanded and rebranded as the Trop Casino Greenville.

In May 2013, Tropicana agreed to sell the River Palms for $7 million to M1 Gaming, owner of Boomtown Reno, but the sale never went through. In July 2014, Tropicana instead agreed to sell the River Palms for $6.75 million to the owners of Dotty's.

In March 2014, it was announced that the company's lease to operate the Horizon Casino Resort had expired on March 31, 2014, and was not renewed. The Park Companies took over the property under an LLC known as "NevaOne" and closed the property on April 1, 2014, to begin an intense $40 million top-to-bottom makeover.

In April 2014, Tropicana acquired Lumière Place, HoteLumière, and the Four Seasons Hotel St. Louis from Pinnacle Entertainment for $260 million.

The company assumed management of the Trump Taj Mahal in Atlantic City after Icahn Enterprises purchased the casino's parent company. It closed in 2016.

In April 2018, the company agreed to be acquired for $1.85 billion by Eldorado Resorts and Gaming and Leisure Properties (GLP). GLP would pay $1.21 billion to buy the land and buildings of Tropicana's casinos, while Eldorado would acquire Tropicana Entertainment for $640 million, and lease the casinos from GLP. The parties later modified the deal so that the real estate of Lumière Place would be sold to Eldorado instead of to GLP. The sale was completed on October 1, 2018. The Tropicana Aruba was excluded from the deal and was separately sold to Icahn Enterprises.

== Casinos ==
The properties owned by the company at the time of its acquisition were:

- Belle of Baton Rouge – Baton Rouge, Louisiana
- Lumière Place – St. Louis, Missouri
- MontBleu – Stateline, Nevada
- Trop Casino Greenville – Greenville, Mississippi
- Tropicana Aruba – Noord, Aruba
- Tropicana Casino & Resort Atlantic City – Atlantic City, New Jersey
- Tropicana Evansville – Evansville, Indiana
- Tropicana Laughlin – Laughlin, Nevada

=== Previous casinos ===
- Bayou Caddy's Jubilee Casino – Greenville, Mississippi
- Casino Aztar – Caruthersville, Missouri (now Lady Luck Casino Caruthersville)
- Horizon Casino Resort – Stateline, Nevada (now Hard Rock Hotel and Casino (Stateline))
- Horizon Vicksburg Casino – Vicksburg, Mississippi (now Grand Station Vicksburg)
- River Palms – Laughlin, Nevada (now Laughlin River Lodge)
- Tropicana Las Vegas – Las Vegas, Nevada
- Trump Taj Mahal – Atlantic City, New Jersey (management only; closed on October 10, 2016; now Hard Rock Hotel & Casino Atlantic City)
