= Tropicana Laughlin =

Hotel and casino in Laughlin, Nevada

Coordinates: 35°9′28″N 114°34′32″W

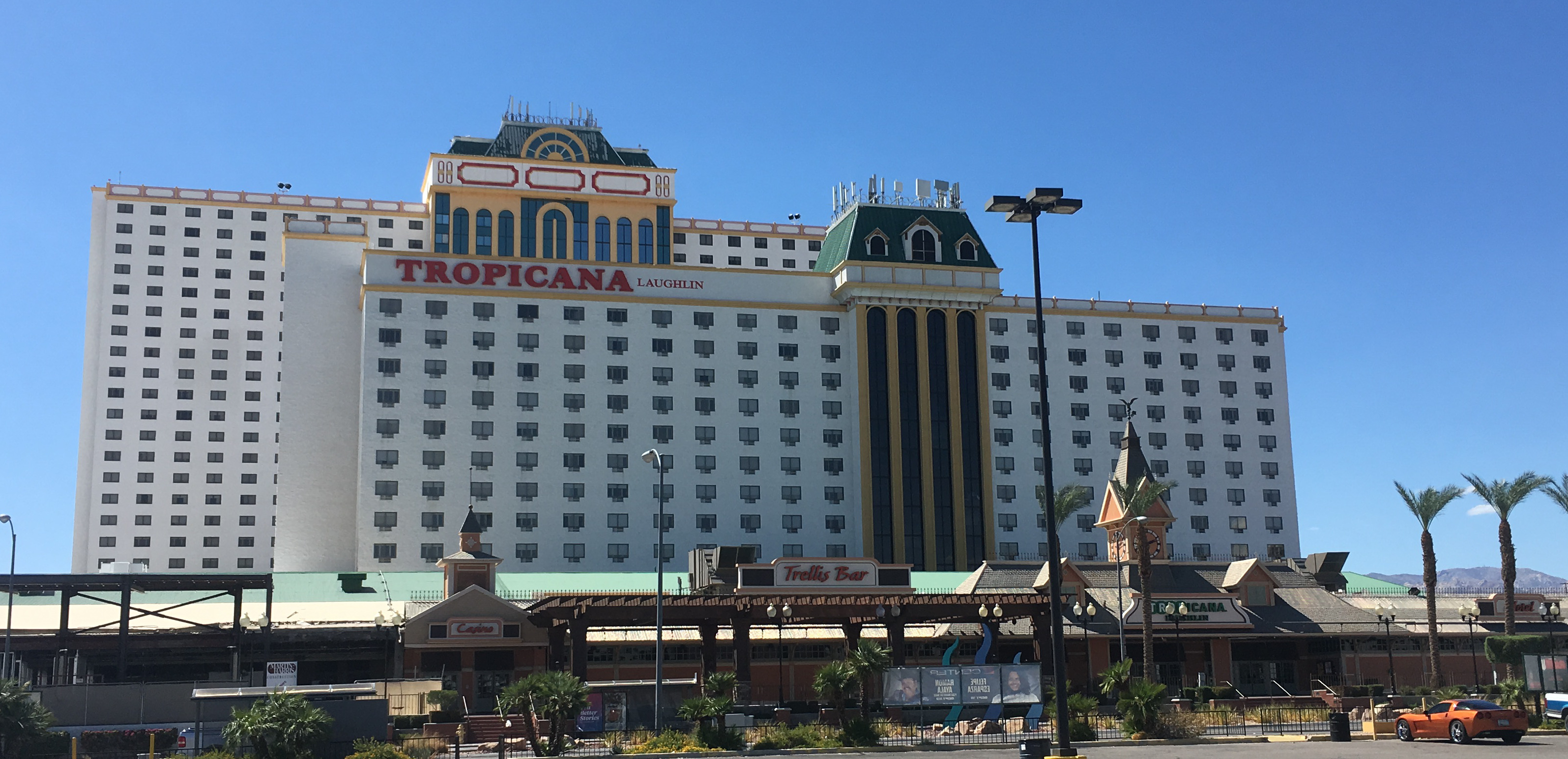
- The property as seen in 2018
- Interactive map of Tropicana Laughlin
- Location: Laughlin, Nevada, U.S.; 2121 South Casino Drive
- Opened: June 1988; 38 years ago
- Theme: Railroad Station
- No. of rooms: 1,498
- Gaming space: 52,840 sq ft (4,909 m^{2})
- Owner: Gaming and Leisure Properties
- Operating license holder: Caesars Entertainment
- Architect: Various, SOSH Architects (Renovations)
- Previous names: Ramada Express (1988–2007); Tropicana Express (2007–2009)
- Renovated in: 1993, 2007, 2009, 2012, 2015, 2017
- Website: troplaughlin.com

The Tropicana Laughlin (formerly Ramada Express and Tropicana Express) is a casino hotel in Laughlin, Nevada. It is owned by Gaming and Leisure Properties and operated by Caesars Entertainment. The hotel has 1,498 guest rooms and suites, located in the 12-story Casino Tower and the 24-story Promenade Tower. The casino has 1,050 slot machines and 21 table games. It includes the restaurants: The Steakhouse, Passaggio Italian Gardens, Carnegie's Café, Taqueria Del Rio, Poolside Café, Dips & Dogs and Victory Plaza.

== History ==
In June 1988, the property opened under the name Ramada Express. In 1993, an expansion was completed that included the Promenade Tower, the Town Square area, additional casino space and restaurants, and a parking garage. In May 2007, Columbia Sussex announced that the Ramada Express would change its name to the Tropicana Express. The hotel opened as the Tropicana Express on July 28, 2007. It was later renamed as Tropicana Laughlin in 2009.

In 2018, Gaming and Leisure Properties (GLP) acquired the real estate of the Tropicana and Eldorado Resorts (later Caesars Entertainment) acquired its operating business, under lease from GLP, as part of the two companies' acquisition of Tropicana Entertainment.

In 2019, the Tropicana's buffet closed permanently.

== Entertainment ==
The Tropicana has the Pavilion Theater, a 9,000-square-foot (840 m^{2}) indoor entertainment venue. It also has Tango's Lounge, which has live entertainment, the Eclipse Bar and a premium slot lounge, the Grand Junction.

== Railroad ==
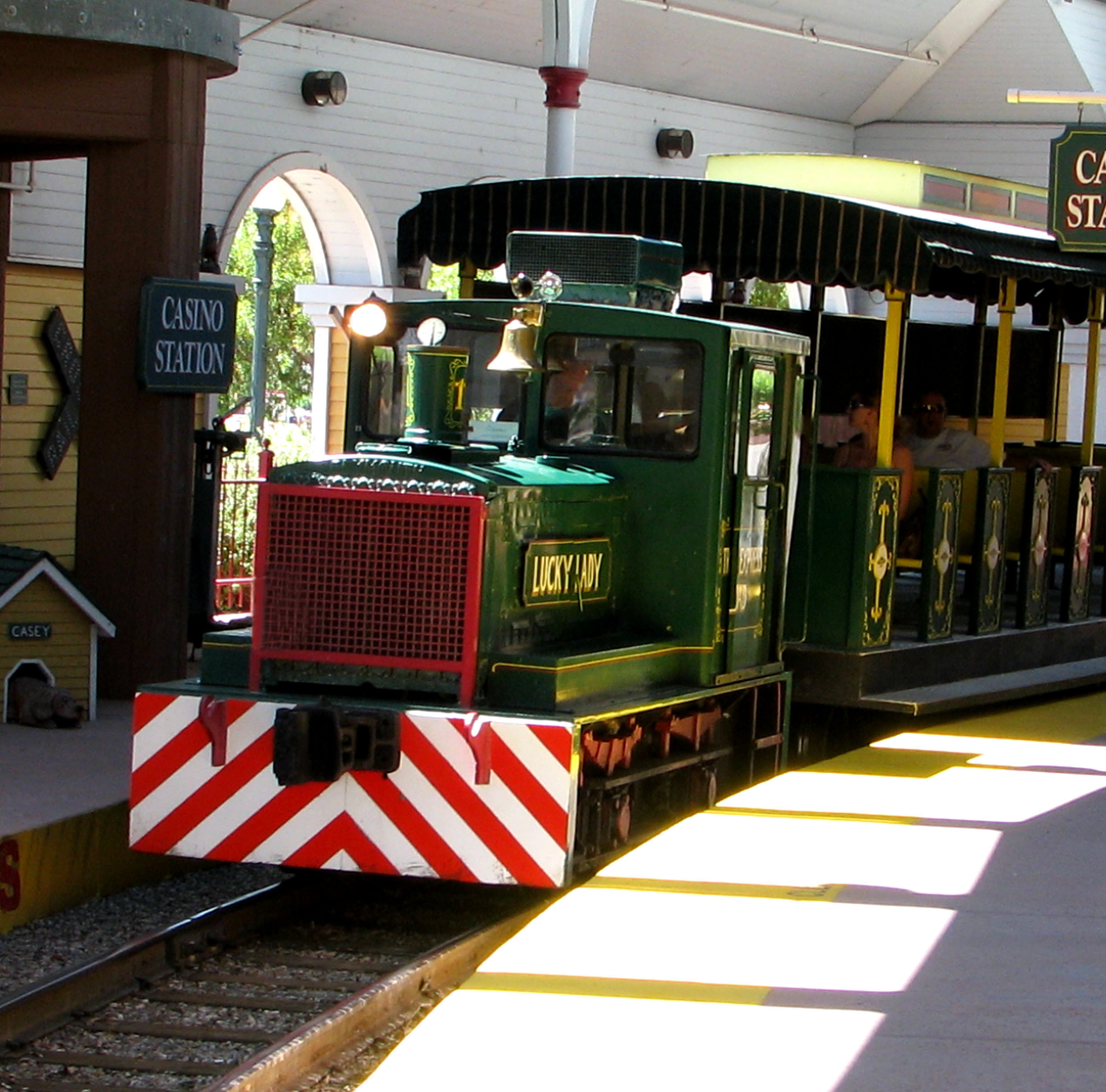
Tropicana Express Train: Diesel engine No. 11 Lucky Lady in 2008

The Tropicana formerly operated a 3 ft (914 mm) narrow gauge train in a loop on the grounds that could be ridden for free. Rolling stock consisted of open passenger cars, a 4-4-0 locomotive replica of the Virginia and Truckee No. 12 Genoa named No. 7 Gambler powered by a diesel engine inside its tender and a Plymouth Locomotive Works engine named No. 11 Lucky Lady used as a spare. The lobby and casino floor was adorned and decorated in a railroad theme with various mementos and artifacts from the historical railroad lines and companies from throughout the United States.

On April 14, 2012, Tropicana Entertainment donated the rolling stock to the Las Vegas Railroad Society. All equipment was trucked from Laughlin to be stored in Las Vegas. In April 2018, the rolling stock was placed on display at the Craig Ranch Regional Park in North Las Vegas. The tracks have since been torn out and all of the railroad memorabilia removed. In 2022 the trains were relocated to Lark Ranch, a private farm amusement park in Greenfield, Indiana.

== See also ==
- Tropicana Las Vegas
- Tropicana Atlantic City
