= Bally's Evansville =

Casino in Evansville, Indiana, United States

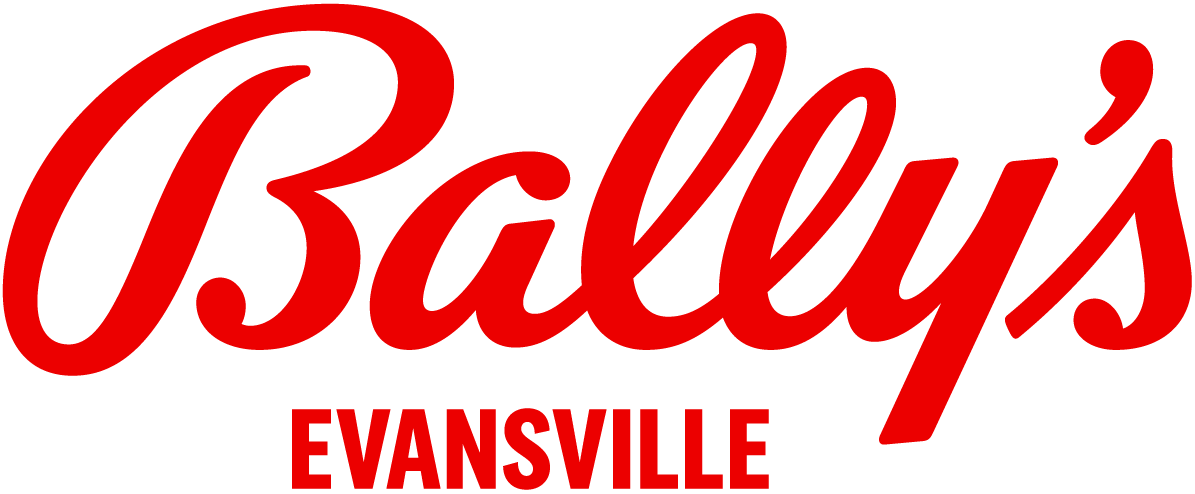
- Interactive map of Bally's Evansville
- Location: Evansville, Indiana; 421 NW Riverside Drive; 37.972756°N 87.580219°W
- Opened: 1995
- No. of rooms: 243 main hotel 95 boutique hotel
- Gaming space: 45,000 sq ft (4,200 m^{2})
- Signature attractions: 24-Hour Casino & Bally Bet Sportsbook & Bar
- Casino type: Land-based
- Owner: Gaming and Leisure Properties
- Operating license holder: Bally's Corporation
- Architect: Various, SOSH Architects (Renovations)
- Previous names: Casino Aztar (1995–2013); Tropicana Evansville (2013–2021)
- Public transit access: METS
- Website: casinos.ballys.com/evansville

Bally's Evansville is a casino hotel and entertainment complex in downtown Evansville, Indiana, United States, owned by Gaming and Leisure Properties and operated by Bally's Corporation.

Originally named Casino Aztar, it was opened by Aztar Corporation in 1995 as the state's first casino. The name was changed to Tropicana Evansville in 2013. In 2017, the casino moved from its original riverboat into a land-based facility. The property was rebranded as Bally's Evansville in 2021.

The main entertainment facility consists of a 45,000-square-foot (4,200 m^{2}) casino with 940 slot games, 28 live and electronic table games, Bally Bet Sportsbook, and a High Limit Room. Accommodations include a 243-room Bally's Evansville Hotel tower and the 95-room Legend's boutique hotel. The property also includes three dining options, three bars, conference center, riverfront event center, and a 1,660-vehicle attached parking garage.

== History ==
Casino Aztar was Indiana's first casino under riverboat gaming legislation passed in 1993. It opened in 1995.

In 2005, the casino generated $137 million in revenue and $41 million in profits.

The entertainment district with a 95-room boutique hotel and additional restaurants opened in late 2006.

The property's name was changed to Tropicana Evansville in 2013.

In 2017, the casino moved from its original riverboat into a land-based facility.

In 2018, the casino's parent company, Tropicana Entertainment sold its real estate assets, including the Tropicana Evansville, to Gaming and Leisure Properties (GLP), while Eldorado Resorts (later named Caesars Entertainment) acquired the casinos' operating businesses.

Bally's Corporation purchased the Tropicana's operating business from Caesars in 2021 for $140 million, leasing the property from GLP for $28 million per year. The property was rebranded as Bally's Evansville later that year.

== The District ==
The Downtown Waterfront Entertainment District is a $40 million expansion, opened in 2006. The district includes a 100-room boutique hotel and a multi-venu entertainment facility centered on a riverfront park.
