= Columbia Sussex =

American hotel company

- Type: Private
- Industry: Hospitality
- Founded: 1972; 54 years ago
- Headquarters: Crestview Hills, Kentucky, U.S.
- Number of locations: 41 hotels
- Website: columbiasussex.com

Columbia Sussex is a privately owned hotel company based in Crestview Hills, Kentucky. The company, owned by the Yung family, owns and operates hotels in various parts of the United States. The current president and founder is William J. Yung III.

Columbia Sussex did not want to make another try for a Missouri gaming license, so Aztar agreed before the acquisition to sell the Caruthersville casino to Fortunes Entertainment, the company of Argosy Gaming co-founder Lance Callis. The deal fell through because the licensing process for Fortunes could not be completed on schedule, so to avoid closing the casino, Aztar allowed the Gaming Commission to appoint a supervisor to operate it, effective when the merger closed. Casino Aztar was finally sold in June 2007 for $45 million to Isle of Capri, which renamed it as Lady Luck Casino.

At the time of the Aztar acquisition, the Tropicana Atlantic City was placed in a trust pending Yung's licensing by the New Jersey Casino Control Commission. Yung's license was denied in December 2007 due in part to complaints about the Tropicana's maintenance and sanitation after Yung laid off 1,300 staffers. The commission declared that the company displayed a "lack of business ability, a lack of financial responsibility, and a lack of good character, honesty and integrity," and a "defiance of the regulatory process." Former New Jersey Supreme Court Justice Gary Stein was appointed as trustee and conservator of the property, with a mandate to find a new buyer.

The loss of the Atlantic City property led Tropicana to default on its bank debt. Yung tried to sell the Vicksburg and Evansville casinos to raise cash to appease creditors, but it was not enough to prevent a lawsuit by bondholders. The Delaware Court of Chancery ruled in February 2008 that the transfer of the property to Stein constituted a technical default on the bonds. Stein asked to transfer the title back to Tropicana to cure the default, but the Commission roundly rejected the request. With no other options remaining, Tropicana Entertainment filed for Chapter 11 bankruptcy in May.

Debtholders viewed Yung's presence as a "distraction" and asked a court to appoint a trustee to run the company. Yung settled the dispute by agreeing in July to step down, leaving the other four board members in place.

In May 2009, Tropicana, seeking to focus its Tahoe-area efforts on the MontBleu, transferred the Horizon Casino to a Columbia Sussex affiliate. Table games at the casino were eliminated, with a possible downsizing of slots also planned.

The Tropicana Las Vegas, which had a $440 million secured loan against it, emerged from bankruptcy in July 2009 as a separate company led by Canadian private equity firm Onex and former MGM Mirage president Alex Yemenidjian. The remainder of the company emerged on March 8, 2010, as Tropicana Entertainment, led by Carl Icahn.

The Amelia Belle, which was not included in the bankruptcy, was sold in October 2009 to Peninsula Gaming, owner of the Evangeline Downs racetrack, for $107 million.

The Westin Casuarina Las Vegas, which also was not included in the bankruptcy, defaulted on its mortgage in April 2010, and lenders, led by CW Financial Services, filed for foreclosure the following November. The hotel's general manager said in October 2011 that Columbia Sussex would not fight the foreclosure.

By 2021 the company was in foreclosure on some hotels due to pandemic losses.

== Hotel brands operated ==
=== Marriott International ===
- Marriott
- JW Marriott Hotels
- Renaissance Hotels
- Courtyard by Marriott
- Westin Hotels

=== Hilton Hotels ===
- Hilton
- DoubleTree by Hilton
- Curio by Hilton

=== Hyatt Hotels ===
- Hyatt Regency
