= Lyle Berman =

American poker player and business executive (born 1941)

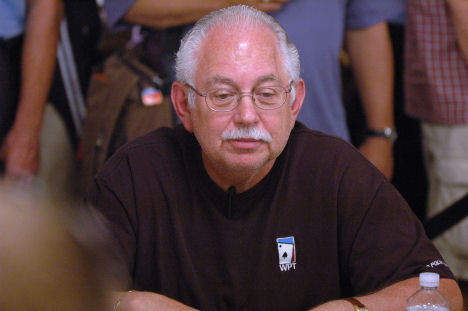
- Berman in the 2005 World Series of Poker
- Born: Lyle Arnold Berman; August 6, 1941 (age 85); Minneapolis, Minnesota, U.S.

World Series of Poker
- Bracelets: 3
- Money finishes: 16
- Highest WSOP Main Event finish: 5th, 1989

World Poker Tour
- Title: None
- Final table: 1
- Money finishes: 3

Lyle Arnold Berman (born August 6, 1941, in Minneapolis, Minnesota) is an American professional poker player and business executive.

A member of the Gaming Hall of Fame, the Poker Hall of Fame, and the Mississippi Gaming Hall of Fame, Berman in 1990 co-founded Grand Casinos. From 1994 to 2000 he was the chairman and CEO of the Rainforest Cafe, and has been chairman of the World Poker Tour and Pokertek.

He merged his Lakes Entertainment with Golden Gaming in 2015, creating Golden Entertainment. In 2022, he was co-chairman of Allied Esports Entertainment.

== Early life ==
Berman grew up in Minnesota and attended the University of Minnesota where he was graduated in 1964 with a degree in business administration.

== Career ==
=== Wilsons Leather ===
After college he then went to work for his father's leather business, Berman Buckskin. In 1979, he sold his apparel company for $10 million to the chemical conglomerate W.R. Grace, with Berman remaining president and CEO until 1987. With insitutional investors, he bought the company back for $93 million, then sold for about twice that much to the Melville Corporation, where it became Wilsons Leather. With the sale, he received a personal check for $18 million.

=== Grand Casinos and Rainforest Cafe ===
Berman also played an important role in gaming companies. In 1990 he was a co-founder of Grand Casinos, a company that sought to create gambling establishments outside of Las Vegas and Atlantic City. He founded Grand Casinos in Hinckley, Minnesota in 1991. From 1994 to 1998, Grand Casinos owned the Stratosphere, before it lost control to Carl Icahn.

He first opened the Rainforest Cafe at the Mall of America in 1993, and from 1994 to 2000 he was the chairman and CEO of the Rainforest Cafe chain of restaurants and retail stores. Additionally, Berman has been the chairman of the board of the World Poker Tour and Pokertek. He won the B'nai B'rith Great American Traditions award in 1995 and the Gaming Executive of the Year award in 1996.

In 2009, it was reported that Berman was one of the many investors victimized by the massive Ponzi scheme of Bernie Madoff, though his actual losses are unknown.

=== Lakes Entertainment ===
When Grand Casinos Inc., Berman's casino-management firm, spun off its Native American casino holdings into the new company Lakes Entertainment, Berman was named CEO. As of 2015, he was the largest shareholder in the Minnesota-based company, as well as chairman and CEO. In January 2015, Lakes Entertainment merged with Golden Gaming, creating a publicly traded casino company called Golden Entertainment. Berman remained a board member of the new company, and signed a three year consulting deal. Blake Sartini succeeded Berman as chairman and CEO of the combined company, which moved from Plymouth to Las Vegas.

In June 2017, Berman remained a director of Golden Entertainment, and the second largest shareholder with 9.1% of its stock. That month, Golden Gaming announced it would acquire American Casino & Entertainment Properties, including casinos such as the Stratosphere Casino, Hotel & Tower, and the Aquarius Casino Resort, among others, for $850 million. At the time, the Star Tribune estimated Berman's stake to be worth about $40 million. In August 2021, he retired from the board of Golden Entertainment.

=== Black Ridge and Allied Esports ===
Berman formed Black Ridge Acquisition in 2017 to pursue energy deals, with its primary holding Black Ridge Oil & Gas. Berman became a director in May 2017 of the SPAC company, then based in Minnesota. In 2018, he purchased two companies with Black Ridge. Having purchased Allied Esports International and WPT Enterprises from Ourgame International Holdings, he planned to form them into the company Allied Esports Entertainment. Berman was expected to be Allied Esports chairman. In August 2019, his company Black Ridge ceased trading on the Nasdaq, and the new company Allied Esports Entertainment (AESE) started trading instead. Berman remained a significant shareholder.

In November 2021, Allied Esports Entertainment owned the HyperX Esports Arena on the Las Vegas Strip. That month, Berman, as co-chairman of the Allied Esports Entertainment board, told investors that the company intended to sell its esports business. Berman stated "it wasn’t an easy decision for us. While we have made great strides in the esports business, it’s still definitely cash burning." In February 2022, Claire Wu resigned as CEO of Allied Esports Entertainment, and Lyle Berman, then co-chairman, was named interim CEO, relinquishing his position as president. He was replaced as CEO in September 2022 by Yinghua Chen, remaining co-chairman and taking on the role of VP of mergers & acquisitions. In December 2022, the company was renamed Allied Gaming & Entertainment, with Yinghua Chen as CEO. Allied Esports International remained a fully owned subsidiary.

Berman is a member of the Gaming Hall of Fame of the American Gaming Association.

== Poker ==
Berman has won three World Series of Poker (WSOP) bracelets and has been a member of the Poker Hall of Fame since 2002.

In 2005, Berman competed in the National Heads Up Championship. He finished in fifth place losing to eventual champion Phil Hellmuth Jr. in the quarterfinals. Although he prefers high-stakes cash games, he had as of 2009 won over $2,500,000 in live poker tournaments. His 16 cashes at the WSOP accounted for $1,446,317 of those winnings.

According to the James McManus book Positively Fifth Street, Berman has bankrolled T. J. Cloutier in numerous poker tournaments, including the 2000 WSOP main event, where he finished 2nd.

=== World Series of Poker bracelets ===
| Year | Tournament | Prize |
|---|---|---|
| 1989 | $1,500 Limit Omaha | $108,600 |
| 1992 | $2,500 No Limit Hold'em | $192,000 |
| 1994 | $5,000 No Limit Deuce to Seven Draw | $128,250 |

== Publications ==
Berman co-authored I'm All In : Lyle Berman and the Birth of the World Poker Tour (ISBN 1-58042-176-8) with Marvin Karlins. With a foreword by Donald Trump, the 2005 autobiography details Berman's life from his childhood to his life as an adult, covering his business ventures, his opinions on poker and Las Vegas, and his experiences with the development of the World Poker Tour.

== Personal life ==
As of 2019, Berman lived in Las Vegas.
