= Carl Icahn =

American businessman and financier (born 1936)

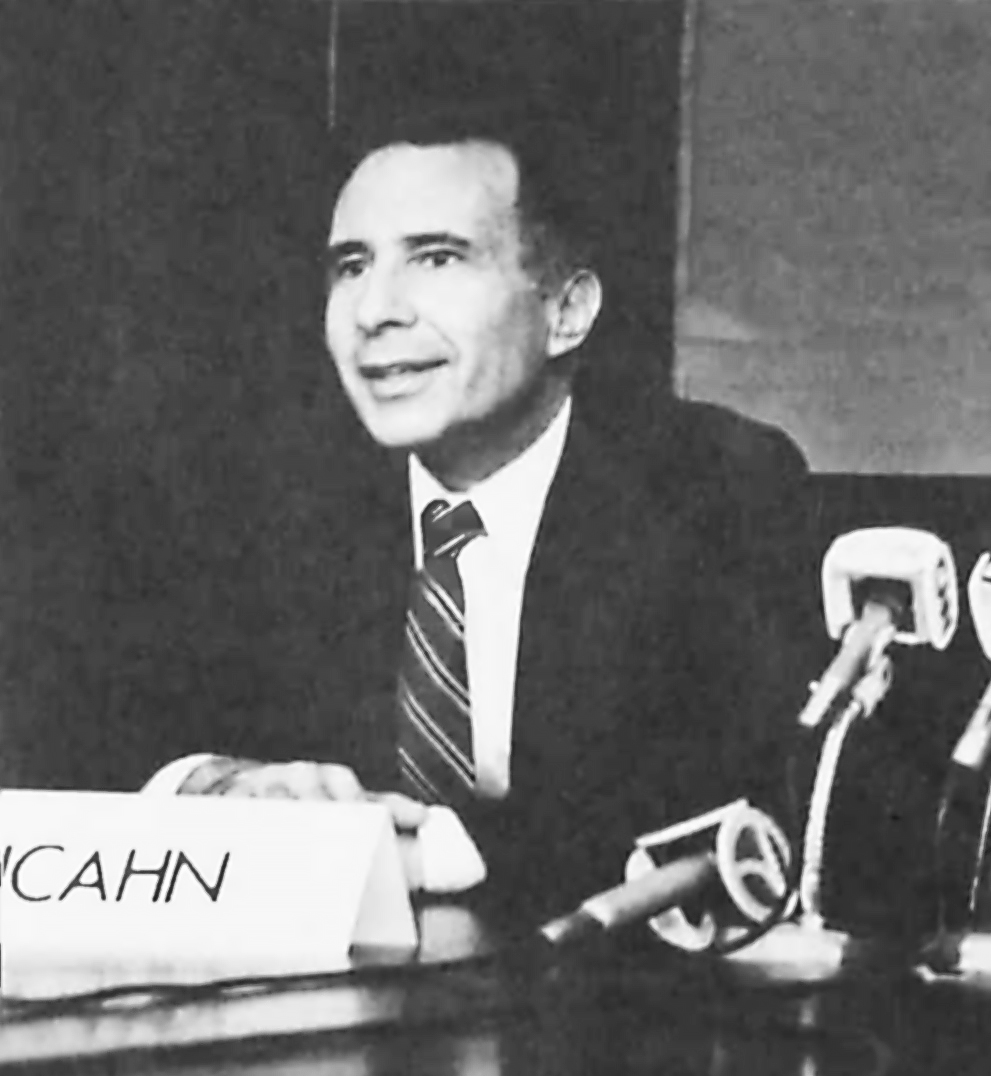
- Icahn at a conference in the 1980s

Special Advisor to the President on Regulatory Reform
- In office January 20, 2017 – August 18, 2017
- President: Donald Trump

Personal details
- Born: Carl Celian Icahn; February 16, 1936 (age 90) New York City, U.S.
- Spouses: Liba Trejbal (m. 1979; div. 1999) Gail Golden (m. 1999; div. 2025)
- Children: 2, including Brett
- Relatives: Rick Schnall (nephew)
- Education: Princeton University (BA)
- Occupation: Businessman, investor, philanthropist, Corporate raider
- Known for: Founding and Managing Icahn Enterprises; Leadership of Federal-Mogul; 1980s "corporate raider"
- Website: carlicahn.com

Carl Celian Icahn (/ˈaɪkɑːn/; born February 16, 1936) is an American businessman and investor. He is the founder and controlling shareholder of Icahn Enterprises, a public company and diversified conglomerate holding company based in Sunny Isles Beach, Florida. Icahn's business model is to take large stakes in companies that he believes will appreciate from changes to corporate policy; Icahn then pressures management to make the changes that he believes will benefit shareholders, and him. Widely regarded as one of the most successful hedge fund managers of all time and one of the greatest investors on Wall Street, he was one of the first activist shareholders and is credited with making that investment strategy mainstream for hedge funds.

In the 1980s, Icahn developed a reputation as a "corporate raider" after profiting from the hostile takeover and asset stripping of Trans World Airlines.

Icahn is on the Forbes 400 and has a net worth of approximately $3.8 billion to $7 billion.

Since 2011, Icahn no longer manages money for outside clients. Investors can still invest in Icahn Enterprises.

== Early life and education ==
Icahn was born on February 16, 1936, in Brooklyn, New York, to an Ashkenazi Jewish family. He was raised in the Far Rockaway neighborhood of Queens in New York City, where he attended Far Rockaway High School. His father, Michael Icahn, a "sworn atheist", was a cantor, and later a substitute teacher. His mother, Bella (née Schnall) also worked as a schoolteacher.

Icahn graduated from Princeton University in 1957 with an B.A. in philosophy after completing a senior thesis titled "The Problem of Formulating an Adequate Explication of the Empiricist Criterion of Meaning". He entered New York University School of Medicine, but dropped out after two years to join the Army Reserve.

== Business career ==
=== 1961–2005 ===
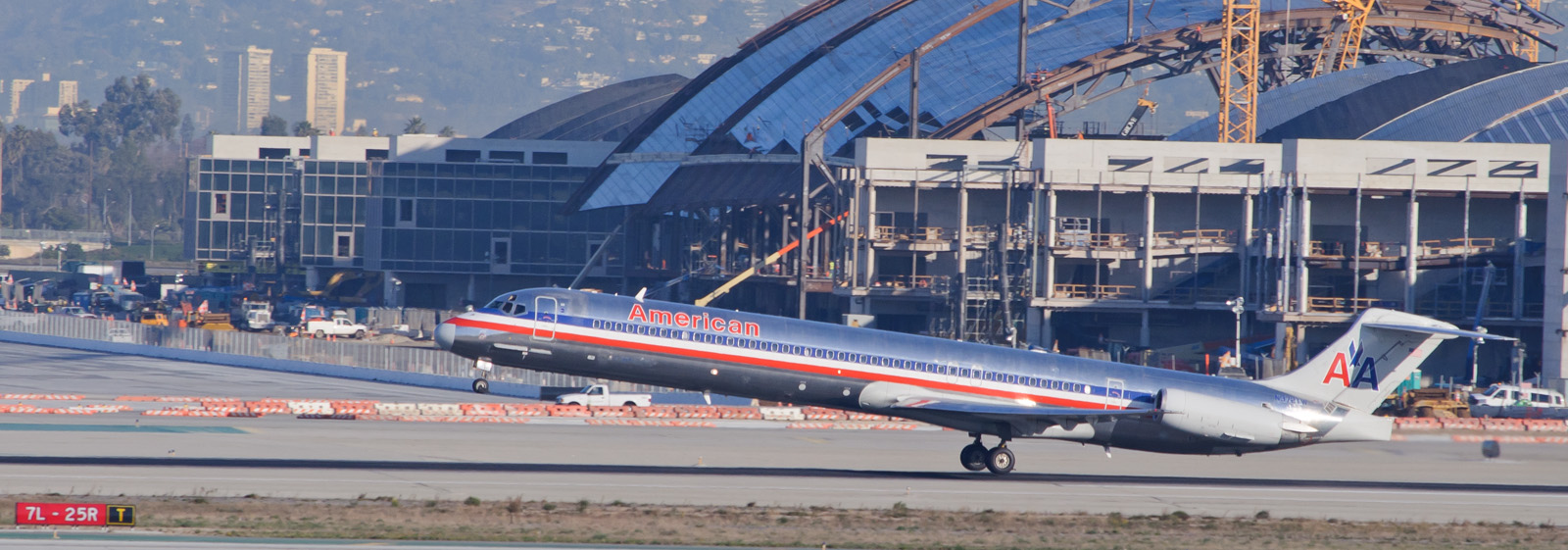
This MD-80 was built in 1999 as part of the last-minute fleet renewal of Trans World Airlines. Due to Icahn's hostile takeover, it was instead sold to American Airlines.

In 1961, Icahn began his career as a stockbroker for Dreyfus Corporation. In 1963, he became an options manager for Tessel, Patrick & Co. and then he moved to Gruntal & Co.

In 1968, with $150,000 of his own money and a $400,000 investment from his uncle, M. Elliot Schnall, Icahn bought a seat on the New York Stock Exchange and formed Icahn & Co., which focused on risk arbitrage and options trading.

In 1978, in his first takeover attempt, he took a controlling stake in Tappan and forced the sale of the company to Electrolux, making a profit of $2.7 million, or doubling his investment. In 1979, he acquired Bayswater Realty & Capital Corporation. In 1983, he acquired ACF Industries and in 1985 he sold those shares to Phillips Petroleum, making a $50 million profit.

In 1985, by pooling his funds with investor funds and funds borrowed from banks, Icahn acquired 50% of Trans World Airlines, and he completely acquired the company in a leveraged buyout in 1988. Icahn systematically sold TWA's assets to repay money he owed, which was described as "asset stripping" and made him known as a "corporate raider". In 1991, he sold TWA's London routes to American Airlines for $445 million. Icahn made a $469 million profit, and left TWA with $540 million in debt. He formed lowestfare.com to sell TWA tickets and acquired portions of Global Leisure Travel from Ramy El-Batrawi.

In October 1986, Icahn launched an unsuccessful $8 billion hostile takeover for 89% of U.S. Steel; the bid was dropped in January 1987. In 1991, he sold his stake in the company for $1 billion, making a $200 million profit.

In June 1989, in the largest share sale to date on the New York Stock Exchange, Icahn sold his stake in Texaco for $2 billion, making a profit of $700 million.

In 1990, he offered to acquire Pan Am for $375 million.

In 1994, he took a 6.6% interest in Western Company of North America as it was in the process of being acquired by BJ Services.

In February 1997, Icahn sold his 7.3% interest in RJR Nabisco for a $125 million profit.

In June 1997, Icahn took control of Marvel Comics in a rivalry with Ronald Perelman.

In March 1998, he again bid for Pan Am, offering $43 million.

In December 1998, Icahn led an investor group that acquired a 5% stake in RJR Nabisco and pressured the company's management to separate its tobacco and food units.

In July 2001, Icahn's Riverdale, LLC lent Genesisintermedia $100 million and received options to purchase 5.5 million shares of the company at an average price of $5.09.

In 2004, Icahn began raising $3 billion to form Icahn Partners, a hedge fund. He took ownership stakes in Blockbuster Video and Time Warner.

In 2004, after Mylan announced a $4 billion stock deal to acquire King Pharmaceuticals, Icahn purchased a large block of stock and threatened a proxy fight, urging shareholders to vote against the acquisition. In February 2005, Mylan gave up its efforts to acquire King.

=== 2005–2010 ===
In 2005, XO Communications announced its intention to sell the wired part of its business for $700 million to Icahn, who was then chairman and a large shareholder; the money would be used to pay back its debts and to buy back its preferred stock for about $600 million from Icahn. Icahn would have then owned the wired business outright, and still own his 60% stake in XO. Despite Icahn's majority ownership and the board of directors declaring the deal to be in the best interest of shareholders, R2 and other minority shareholders blocked the transaction through the court system in 2008, which charged Icahn with penalties due to his conflict of interest.

In August 2006, Icahn bought stock in Take-Two Interactive, a video game publisher, and increased his holdings to 11.3% in 2009, becoming the company's second-largest shareholder.

In January 2007, he purchased a 9.2% stake in Telik, a biotech company engaged in cancer research. He also acquired 6.1 million shares of WCI Communities, later acquired by Lennar.

In May 2007, Icahn lost an election for a seat on the board of directors of Motorola, despite owning 3% of the company.

On February 9, 2007, Lear Corporation's board of directors accepted a $2.3 billion takeover offer from Icahn.

That month he also invested $50 million in Motricity, a North Carolina–based provider of mobile content delivery technology.

In September 2007, Icahn increased his stake in BEA Systems to 13.22%, a few months before Oracle Corporation announced its acquisition of BEA Systems, which Icahn supported.

Beginning in 2007, Icahn gradually increased his stake in Biogen.

In April 2007, Icahn sold his casino interests in Nevada, including the Stratosphere Las Vegas, Arizona Charlie's Boulder, Arizona Charlie's Decatur, and Aquarius Casino Resort which were operated through American Casino & Entertainment Properties, a subsidiary of Icahn Enterprises, for $1.3 billion or $1 billion more than he paid for the properties, to a unit of Goldman Sachs.

In March 2008, Icahn sued Motorola as part of his effort to gain four seats on Motorola's board and force a sale of its mobile business.

In May 2008, Icahn purchased a large block of shares in Yahoo!, and shortly thereafter threatened to start a proxy fight to remove Yahoo's board of directors in response to their rejection of a takeover bid by Microsoft. Instead, he forced an agreement to expand Yahoo's board to eleven members, including Icahn and two others of his choice.

In June 2008, Icahn launched a blog, The Icahn Report.

In September/October 2008 Icahn was involved in the rejected attempted purchase of Imclone by Bristol-Myers Squibb and in the eventual sale of Imclone to Eli Lilly and Company for $6.5 billion in cash.

In December 2008, he filed suit against Realogy over a proposed debt swap.

In April 2009, Icahn engaged in a proxy battle for Amylin.

In September 2009, he offered to buy the shares of XO he did not already own for $0.55 each. He later raised his offer to $0.80, which ultimately expired.

In October, he resigned from the board of directors at Yahoo!, and by the following February had reduced his equity stake from a one-time high of 75 million shares to 12 million shares.

In February 2010, Icahn, through a subsidiary of his Icahn Enterprises LP, acquired the Fontainebleau Las Vegas for about $150 million. In March he was one of a group of lenders who purchased Tropicana Casino & Resort Atlantic City, bringing the company out of bankruptcy for $200 million.

In March 2011, he conducted a failed takeover bid for Lionsgate Films.

In May 2010, he announced the purchase of an 8.54% stake in Lawson Software.

=== 2010–2015 ===
In May 2010, Icahn held a 6.9% stake in Mentor Graphics, increasing to 14% in July. Mentor's retaliation with a shareholder rights plan failed to deter Icahn who, in February 2011, made an unsuccessful offer to buy the company for about $1.86 billion in cash.

In January 2011, Icahn offered to buy Clorox for $10.2 billion. By February he had accumulated a 9.08% stake in the company.

In October 2012, Icahn reported a 10% stake in Netflix.

In November 2012, he tried to gain control of the board of directors of Oshkosh Corporation.

In February 2013, Forbes listed Icahn as one of the 40 highest-earning hedge fund managers.

By April 2013, Icahn accumulated a 9.2% stake in Nuance Communications. On August 2, 2013, Icahn sued computer giant Dell and its board in an attempt to derail a $24.4 billion buyout bid by the CEO, Michael Dell, in favor of his own rumored forthcoming bid. In October 2013, Icahn held 4.7 million shares of Apple Inc. The same month, Icahn acquired around 61 million shares in Talisman Energy, leading to a surge in the share price. Also that month, he sold about 50% of his shares in Netflix for a profit in excess of $800 million in less than one year.

In November 2013, he acquired a 12.5% interest in Hologic, a medical device and diagnostics manufacturer.

In January 2014, Icahn invested another half billion dollars in Apple Inc.

Also in January 2014, Icahn pushed eBay to complete the corporate spin-off of PayPal. This started a proxy fight which was settled by April.

In October 2014, Icahn invested in Talisman Energy. The company's stock price went down by 71% and he sold his shares two months later.

=== Since 2015 ===
On May 15, 2015, Icahn made a $100 million investment in Lyft.

In November 2015, Icahn hired CBRE Group to market the unfinished Fontainebleau Las Vegas to potential buyers. Also in November 2015, he swapped his stake in eBay for shares in PayPal. Also in November 2015, Icahn disclosed a 7.13% stake in Xerox.

In December 2015, Icahn offered to acquire Pep Boys. He also raised his stake in Cheniere Energy to 13.8%, making him its largest shareholder.

In August 2017, Icahn sold the unfinished Fontainebleau Resort Las Vegas for $600 million, more than four times what he paid.

In January 2016, Icahn disclosed a 4.66% stake in Gannett Company and also held shares in Cheniere Energy and Freeport-McMoRan, both of which declined in value. Icahn sold his Apple shares in April 2016, citing concerns about Apple's relationship with China.

In August 2016, Icahn increased his stake in Herbalife Nutrition to 21%.

Also in October 2016, Icahn closed the Trump Taj Mahal Casino in Atlantic City, citing a $350 million loss over several years as well as failure to reach a deal with striking union workers. Nearly 3,000 workers lost their jobs.

In November 2016, he increased his holdings in the car rental company The Hertz Corporation, after the company's stock price had declined significantly.

In 2017, Icahn acquired a 9.7% stake in Conduent, sold out of Allergan and Nuance Communications, and increased his stakes in Navistar International and Herbalife Nutrition.

In May 2020, Icahn sold his entire 39% stake, or 55.3 million shares, of Hertz Global for 72 cents a share. He lost almost $2 billion on the investment.

In February 2022 Icahn, who held 200 shares of the company, nominated two people for election to McDonald's board of directors in what may be the first step toward a proxy fight. Icahn aims to pressure McDonald's to improve conditions of pigs raised by its suppliers.

However, in May 2022, only 1% of McDonald's' shareholders voted in favor of nominees put forward by Icahn, scoring a victory against his demands for the improvement of conditions in which pigs are raised. In its statement, McDonald's claimed it is already moving towards a more humane approach to the issue since its pledge in 2012, adding that Icahn's demands were unreasonable.

In May 2023, short seller Hindenburg Research released an analysis of Icahn's public company Icahn Enterprises that claims the company is over-valued due to paying large dividends using investments from new investors. In addition, the analysis claims that Icahn took out loans against a majority of his holdings and that these have the potential to be called should the stock price move downward. On the day of the release of this analysis, the share price of Icahn Enterprises dropped by 20%.

== Public policy and economic views ==
Icahn endorsed Donald Trump in the 2016 United States presidential election. He also announced the formation of a super PAC pledging $150 million to push for corporate tax reform, in particular of tax inversions, which occur when corporations move their headquarters from the U.S. to take advantage of lower tax rates elsewhere.

Upon becoming the presumptive Republican presidential nominee, Trump announced that he would nominate Icahn for United States Secretary of the Treasury. However, he instead nominated Steven Mnuchin.

On December 21, 2016, it was announced that Icahn would serve as special advisor to the president on regulatory reform under President Donald Trump and that Icahn would aid Trump in an "individual capacity" rather than as a federal employee, and that he would not have "specific duties" and therefore would not have to relinquish his business interests while serving as an advisor to Trump. Icahn stepped down from this role on August 18, 2017, citing a desire not to interfere with the work of Neomi Rao as administrator of the Office of Information and Regulatory Affairs.

In February 2018, Icahn avoided a $6 million loss by selling some of his holdings in a steel-price sensitive stock just days before the Trump administration announced a 25% tariff on steel imports.

When the President had Icahn interview Scott Pruitt during consideration of his nomination as Administrator of the Environmental Protection Agency, Icahn specifically asked Pruitt about his position on the EPA's Renewable Fuel Standard. Icahn spoke directly to President Trump and to Gary Cohn about his proposed changes to the ethanol rule. CVR Energy, in which Icahn has 82% ownership, would save $205.9 million a year if Icahn's proposal was adopted. The Sugar Land, Texas oil refinery benefited when President Trump made an exception to his regulation freeze to expand the tax advantage of master limited partnerships. CVR Energy's stock doubled after President Trump's election, increasing $455 million in value.

== Personal life ==
In the summer of 1978, Icahn, then 41 years old, met Liba Trejbal, a 28-year-old ballerina from the former Czechoslovakia. She became pregnant 8 months later and Icahn offered to marry her if she signed a prenuptial agreement. They were married in March 1979. In October 1993, Liba filed for divorce and sued to invalidate the prenuptial agreement, claiming she signed it under duress due to the pregnancy. The divorce was settled in July 1999. They have two children, Brett Icahn and Michelle Celia Icahn Nevin. His nephew is Rick Schnall.

In 1999, Icahn married his longtime assistant and former broker, Gail Golden. She has two children from a previous marriage. The couple separated in 2025.

== Philanthropy ==
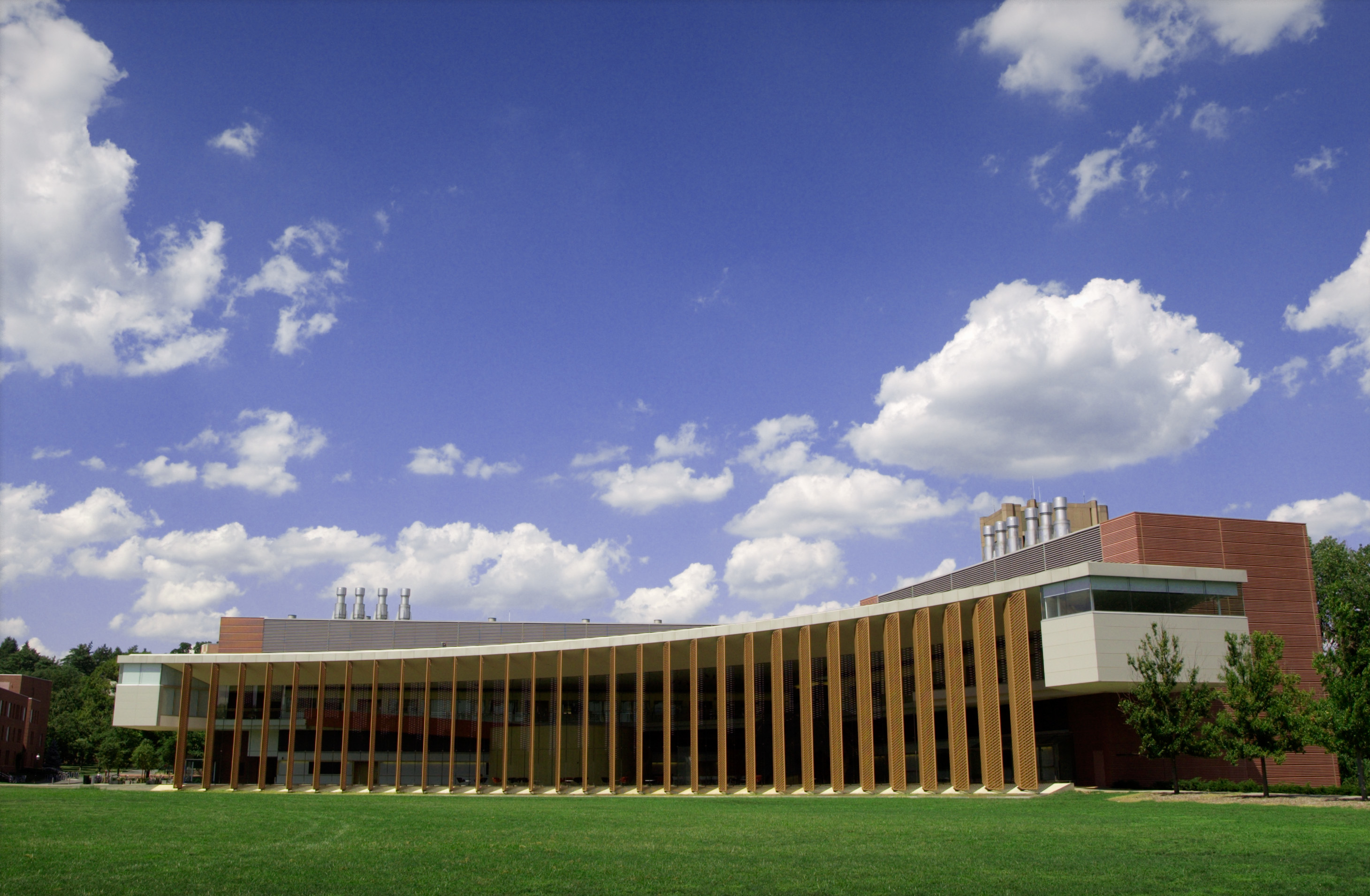
The Carl C. Icahn Laboratory at Princeton University

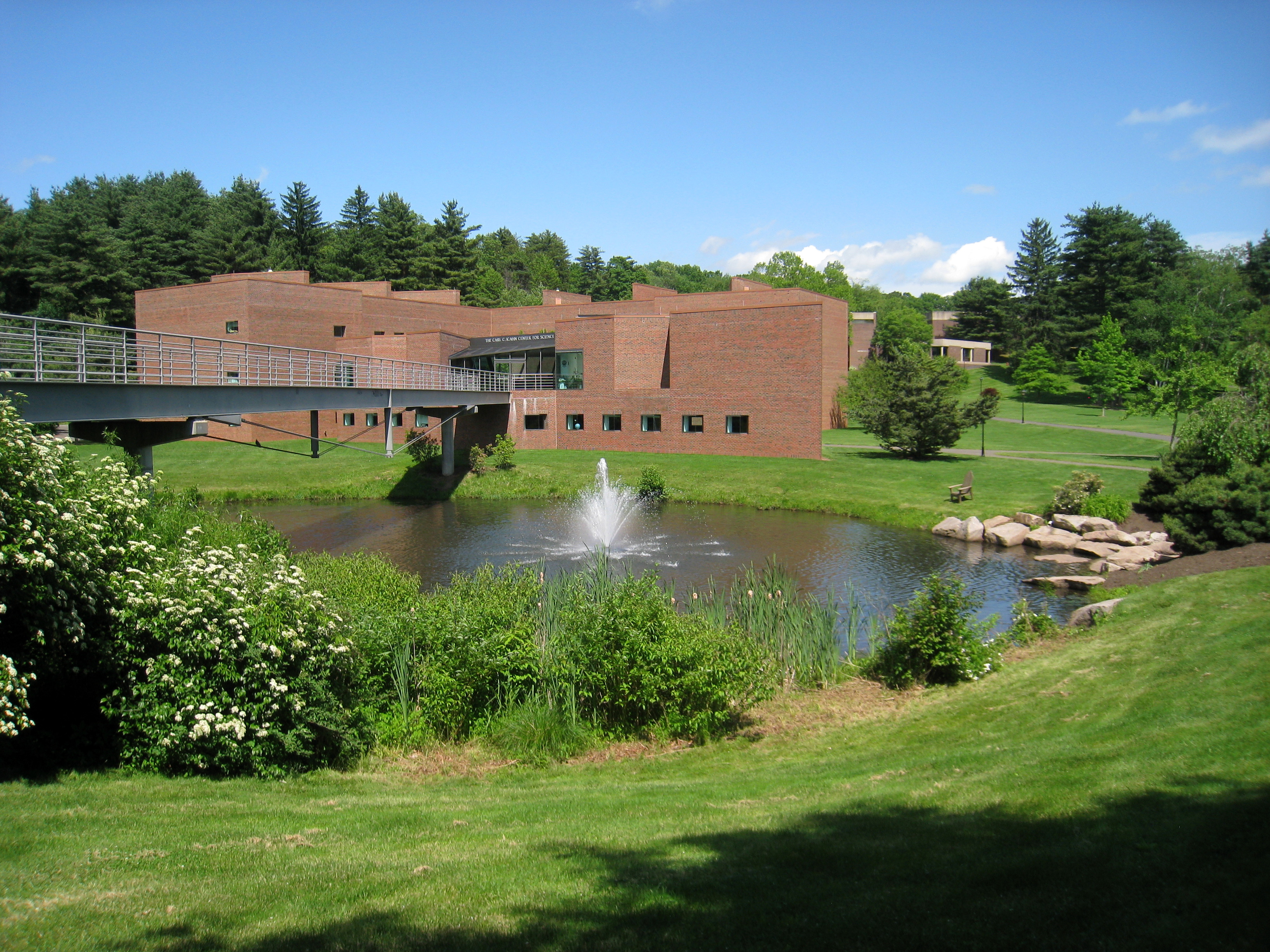
The Carl C. Icahn Center for Science at Choate Rosemary Hall

Icahn Stadium on Randall's Island in New York City is named after him, as is the Carl C. Icahn Center for Science and Icahn Scholar Program at Choate Rosemary Hall, a prep school in Connecticut. This organization pays for tuition, room and board, books, and supplies for 10 students every year for four years (freshman–senior), an endowment valued at about $400,000 per annum.

Icahn made a substantial contribution to his alma mater, Princeton University, to fund a genomics laboratory which bears his name, the Carl C. Icahn Laboratory at the university's Institute for Integrated Genomics. He also made large contributions to Mount Sinai Hospital, New York, of which he is a trustee, which in return named a building the Icahn Medical Institute designed by Davis Brody Bond, and also, in 2013, renamed the Mount Sinai School of Medicine as the Icahn School of Medicine at Mount Sinai. The genomics institute led by Brian Brown, PhD, was renamed the Icahn Genomics Institute.

His foundation, the Children's Rescue Fund, built Icahn House in The Bronx, a 65-unit complex for homeless families consisting of single pregnant women and single women with children, and operates Icahn House East and Icahn House West, both of which are homeless shelters in New York City.

In 2010, Icahn joined the Giving Pledge list, pledging to give away more than half his fortune. Icahn is an activist investor, and has worked with the Humane Society of the United States in pushing McDonald's to achieve its pledge to end the sourcing of pork produced with gestation crates.

== In the media ==
Oliver Stone used Icahn as the basis for the hostile, cutthroat capitalist character of Gordon Gekko, portrayed by Michael Douglas in his hit film Wall Street (1987). One of Icahn's shareholder meeting speeches provided the basis for Gekko's iconic "greed is good" speech.

Carl Icahn is featured in the 2022 Emmy-nominated HBO documentary Icahn: The Restless Billionaire directed by Bruce David Klein and produced by Atlas Media Corp.

== Awards and honors ==
Icahn has the following awards:

- Golden Plate Award of the American Academy of Achievement in 1984,
- Starlight Foundation – Founders Award & 1990 Man of the Year Award.
- Guardian Angel 2001 Man of the Year
- In 2004, he was honored by the Center for Educational Innovation – Public Education Association for his work with charter schools.
- In 2006, he was honored with the 100 Women in Hedge Funds Effecting Change Award for his outstanding contributions to improving education.

== Thoroughbred horse racing ==
In 1985, Icahn established Foxfield Thoroughbreds, a horse breeding operation. At that year's Newstead Farm Trust sale run by Fasig-Tipton, he paid $4 million for Larida, a six-year-old mare and a record $7 million for the four-year-old bay mare Miss Oceana who was in foal to champion sire, Northern Dancer.

Icahn's Meadow Star won the 1990 Breeders' Cup Juvenile Fillies and was voted the American Champion Two-Year-Old Filly.

In 1992, Foxfield ended its racing operation and became a commercial breeder, having bred more than 140 graded stakes race horses.

In 2004, Icahn shut down Foxfield, selling all his mares and weanlings without reserve at the Keeneland Sales November breeding stock auction.

== See also ==
- List of people and organisations named in the Paradise Papers
