= Lakes Entertainment =

American gaming company

Lakes Entertainment, Inc.
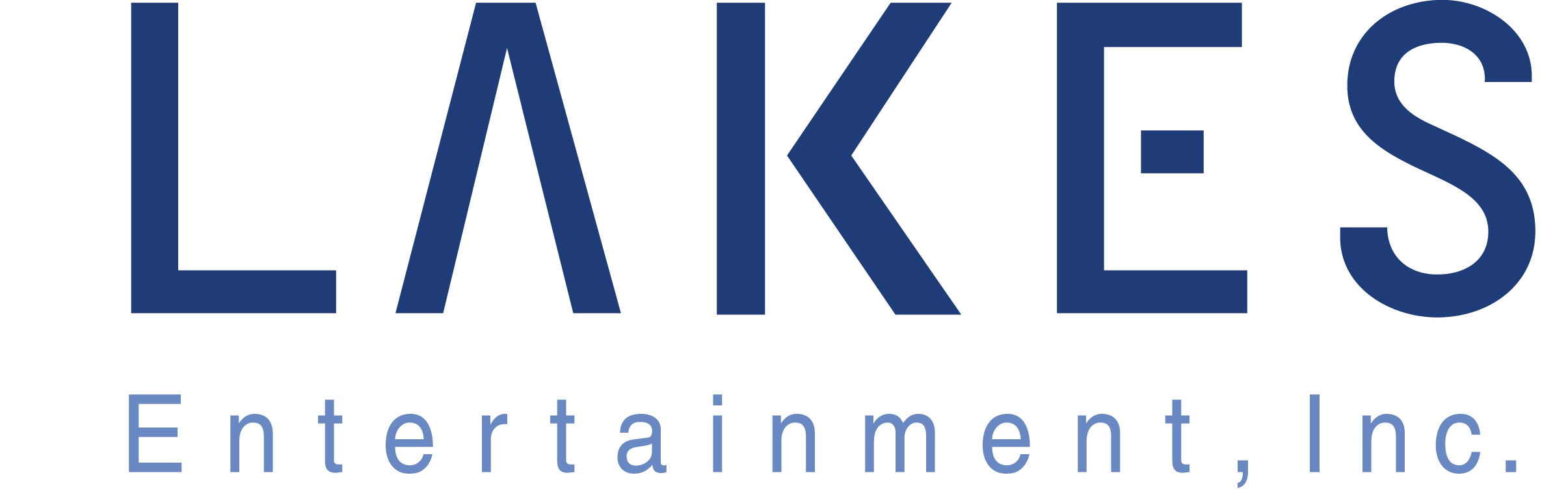
- Type: Public
- Traded as: Nasdaq: LACO
- Industry: Gaming
- Founded: 1998; 28 years ago
- Defunct: August 3, 2015; 11 years ago
- Successor: Golden Entertainment
- Headquarters: Minnetonka, Minnesota, U.S.

Lakes Entertainment, Inc. was an American gaming company based in Minnetonka, Minnesota. It merged with Golden Gaming in 2015 to form Golden Entertainment.

== History ==
The company was created on December 31, 1998 as part of the merger between Grand Casinos and Hilton's gaming businesses to form Park Place Entertainment. Park Place acquired Grand's three riverboat casinos in Mississippi, while Grand's other businesses were spun off to Grand's shareholders as Lakes Gaming. Lakes's business at the time of its formation included the management of two Indian casinos in Louisiana (Grand Casino Avoyelles and Grand Casino Coushatta) and ownership of 10 acres (4.0 ha) of land on the Las Vegas Strip.

In 1999, Lakes struck a deal to buy the Rainforest Cafe chain for $108 million, but the agreement fell through after Landry's made a higher offer.

Lakes's management agreement at the Grand Casino Avoyelles was bought out in 2000, and its management agreement for the Grand Casino Coushatta expired in 2002. This left the company with no active operations, though it had plans to develop casinos with several tribes.

In 2002, Lakes launched the World Poker Tour (WPT). The company changed its name to Lakes Entertainment to reflect its involvement in the WPT and potentially other non-casino businesses. Lakes sold off a portion of the WPT through an initial public offering in 2004, but retained majority ownership. In 2008, Lakes spun off WPT, distributing its remaining shares to shareholders.

Lakes developed the Red Hawk Casino in Shingle Springs, California for the Shingle Springs Band of Miwok Indians, and managed the casino from its opening in 2008 until 2013.

Lakes opened the Rocky Gap Casino Resort in Maryland in May 2013.

Lakes sold its interest in Dania Jai-Alai in 2014.

In January 2015, Lakes agreed to merge with Golden Gaming. The combined company would be named Golden Entertainment. Golden Gaming head Blake Sartini would own 35% of the company and serve as its chief executive officer, while Lakes head Lyle Berman would be a board member and consultant. In preparation for the merger, Lakes sold its 10 percent interest in Rock Ohio Ventures, which owns five casinos and racetracks in Ohio and Kentucky. The merger was completed on August 3, 2015.

== Properties ==
- Red Hawk Casino
- Dania Jai-Alai
- Rocky Gap Casino Resort
- Rock Ohio Ventures (10%)
