= Arizona Charlie's =

Arizona Charlie's may refer to:

- Arizona Charlie's Boulder, a casino hotel in the Paradise area of Las Vegas, Nevada, open since 2001
- Arizona Charlie's Decatur, a casino hotel in the Charleston Heights area of Las Vegas, Nevada, open since 1988

== See also ==
- Arizona Charlie (1859–1932), American showman and sharpshooter, namesake of the hotels
