= Eddie Chiles =

American businessman (1910–1993)

- Born: May 11, 1910
- Died: August 22, 1993 (aged 83)
- Known for: Owner of Texas Rangers (1980–1989); Founder of Western Company of North America

Harrell Edmonds Chiles (May 11, 1910 – August 22, 1993) was the founder of the Western Company of North America and an owner of the Texas Rangers. He was also the paternal uncle of actress Lois Chiles.

Eddie Chiles was born in Itasca, Texas to Harsh Edmonds Chiles and Jewell (née Files). After graduating from Wentworth Military Academy’s Junior College in Lexington, Missouri in 1929, he worked as an oil patch roustabout and as a merchant marine before hitchhiking to Norman, Oklahoma in 1930.

In 1934, he graduated from the University of Oklahoma with a B.S. degree in Petroleum Engineering. In 1939, after working as a Sales Engineer with Reed Roller Bit Company in Houston, he founded the Western Company of North America. He started the company with two trucks and three employees. Western served the petroleum industry with technical services required in the discovery and production of oil and gas. The company grew to become a major oil services firm, primarily in acidizing, fracturing and cementing. At its peak, the Western Company had over 5,000 employees and annual worldwide revenues of over $500 million. During the 1970s, the Western Company also operated an offshore drilling company run by Mr. Chiles' brother, Clay Chiles. The company was sold to BJ Services in 1995.

Chiles bought the Texas Rangers baseball team in 1980 and served as chairman of the club until 1989 when he sold the team to a group of investors that included the future President of the United States George W. Bush; New York stockbroker Richard Gilder (who later married Chiles' niece, Lois); Frank L. Morsani; and the Mack family.

As an advocate for a smaller and less intrusive federal government, Chiles was also known for his 1970s radio commentaries. His trade-mark sign-on "I'm Eddie Chiles, and I'm mad as hell," created an incredible demand for bumper stickers that read "I'm mad too, Eddie!" Western also featured television commercials telling viewers "If you don't have an oil well, get one – you'll love doing business with Western!" Through these conservative radio commentaries, Chiles became a folk hero in the southwest section of the nation. He died in Fort Worth, Texas on August 22, 1993, at the age of 83.

== Personal life ==
Chiles was married to Fran Hafer, and had two children from a previous marriage, Jerry Edmond Chiles and Carol Ann Chiles Ballard.
