= Arizona Charlie's Decatur =

Casino hotel in Las Vegas, Nevada

Coordinates: 36.1635°N 115.2074°W

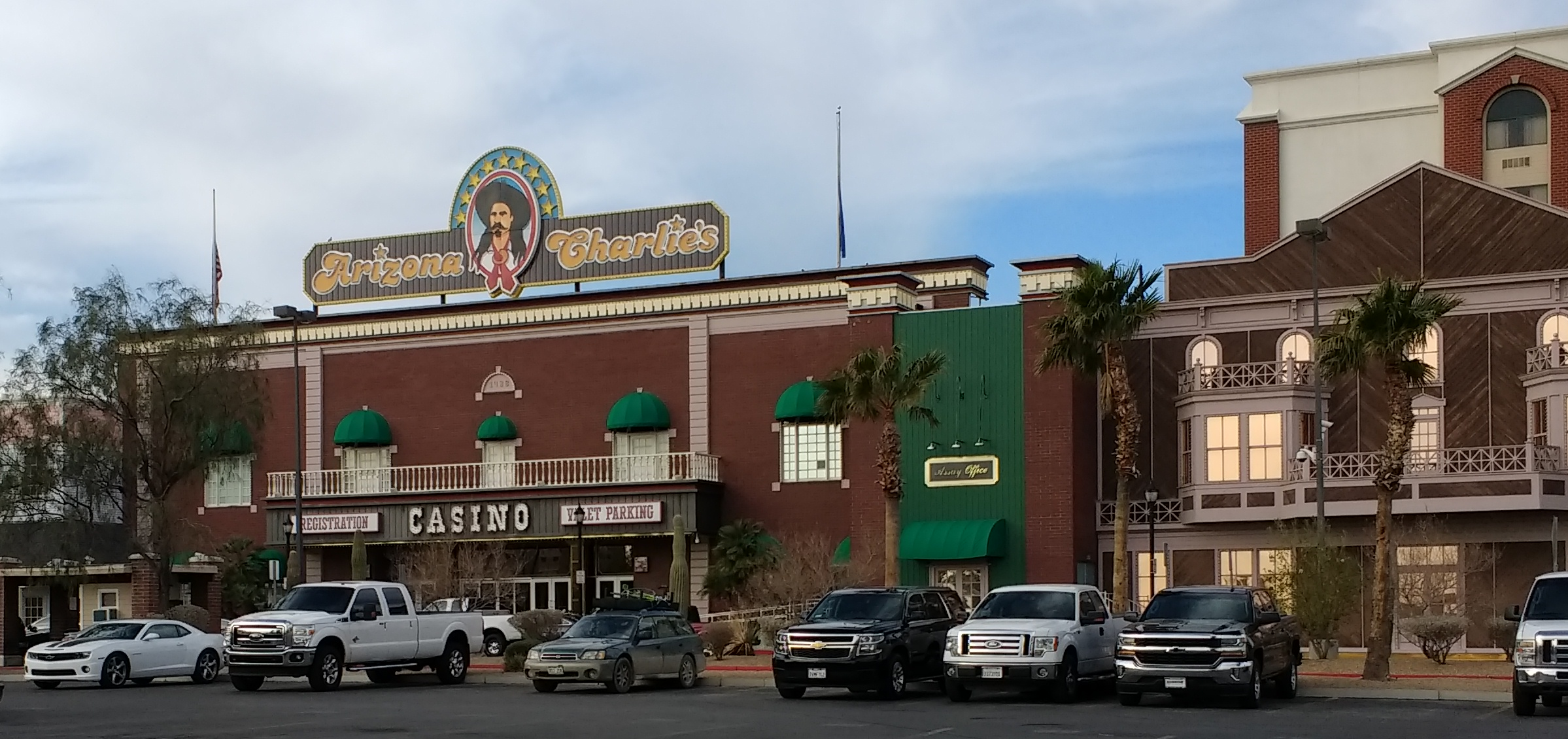
- Arizona Charlie's Decatur in 2017
- Interactive map of Arizona Charlie's Decatur
- Location: Las Vegas, Nevada, U.S.; 740 Decatur Boulevard
- Opened: April 1988; 38 years ago
- No. of rooms: 258
- Gaming space: 55,227 sq ft (5,130.8 m^{2})
- Casino type: Land-based
- Owner: Vici Properties
- Operating license holder: Golden Entertainment
- Previous names: Arizona Charlie's (1988–2000); Arizona Charlie's West (2000–2003)
- Renovated in: 1994, 2021
- Website: www.arizonacharliesdecatur.com

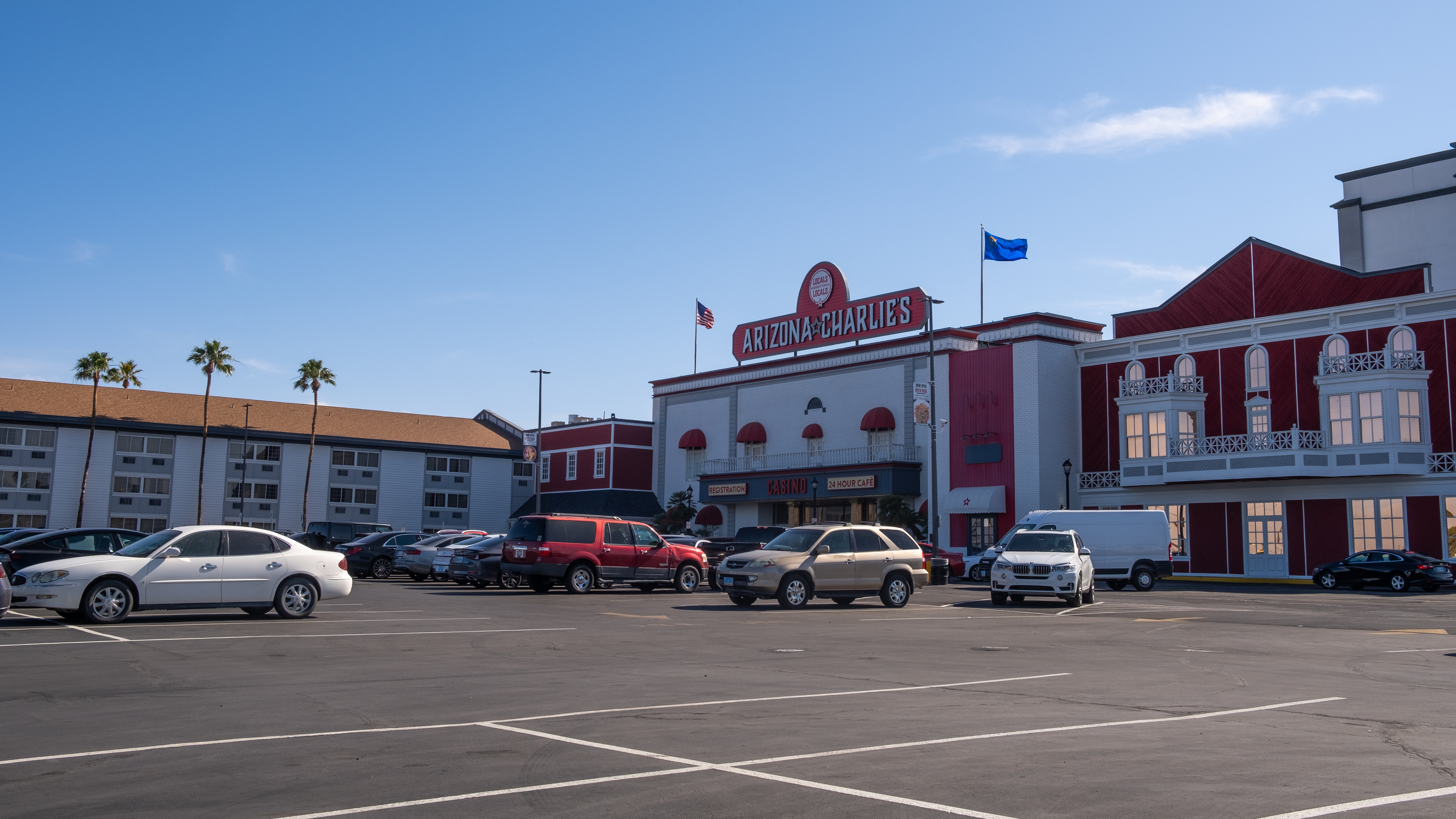
Arizona Charlie's Decatur in 2025

Arizona Charlie's Decatur is a hotel and locals casino in Las Vegas, Nevada, United States. It includes 258 rooms and 55,227 sq ft (5,130.8 m^{2}) of gaming space. The property began in 1963, as a bowling alley developed by the Becker family. Bruce Becker eventually took over management and proposed adding a hotel-casino. The property opened in April 1988, and is named after a distant relative of the family, Arizona Charlie.

Residents were originally opposed to having a hotel-casino in the area, although the property has since become popular among locals. It opened with a three-story, 100-room hotel. The bowling alley was removed during an expansion in 1994, which included a seven-story hotel addition.

The property's operating company filed bankruptcy in 1997, and Arizona Charlie's was purchased the following year by businessman Carl Icahn, who owned it for the next decade. Golden Entertainment eventually acquired it in 2017.

A sister property, Arizona Charlie's Boulder, is located along Boulder Highway in the east Las Vegas Valley.

== History ==
In the 1960s, Ernest Becker III and his family built the Charleston Heights shopping center, located along Decatur Boulevard. It included a 36-lane bowling alley known as Charleston Heights Bowl, opened in 1963. Son Bruce Becker took over management of the bowling alley in the 1970s, and proposed adding a hotel-casino onto it during the 1980s.

Construction of Arizona Charlie's began in July 1987, with the project costing $18 million. The Western-themed property opened in April 1988, with a three-story, 100-room hotel. It is named after a distant relative of the Becker family, Arizona Charlie (1860–1932), who once performed in western shows with Buffalo Bill.

Area residents had protested the construction of Arizona Charlie's, arguing that it would lead to increased crime and traffic in the neighborhood. A hotel expansion, consisting of three six-story towers, was approved by the Las Vegas City Council in 1991. Residents were also critical of this plan, which would require shutting down the adjacent Evergreen Avenue, just south of Arizona Charlie's. Residents opposed the street's closure, leading to a lengthy battle with the hotel-casino. In 1993, the property reduced its expansion plan to a single new tower, standing seven stories. The expansion project cost $38 million, and necessitated removal of the bowling alley. During this time, casino operations continued in a temporary tent that contained 375 slot machines. The expansion opened in 1994.

The property's operating company, Arizona Charlie's Inc., filed for Chapter 11 bankruptcy in 1997, after investing in a failed riverboat casino project in Missouri. Businessman Carl Icahn soon purchased a 51-percent interest in Arizona Charlie's mortgage debt, and Station Casinos also purchased a small interest. By May 1998, Icahn and Station had both launched efforts to take over Arizona Charlie's, and the Becker family was fighting in bankruptcy court to maintain control of the property. Station eventually decided not to pursue a purchase, following opposition from Crescent Real Estate, which, at the time, was planning to merge with Station.

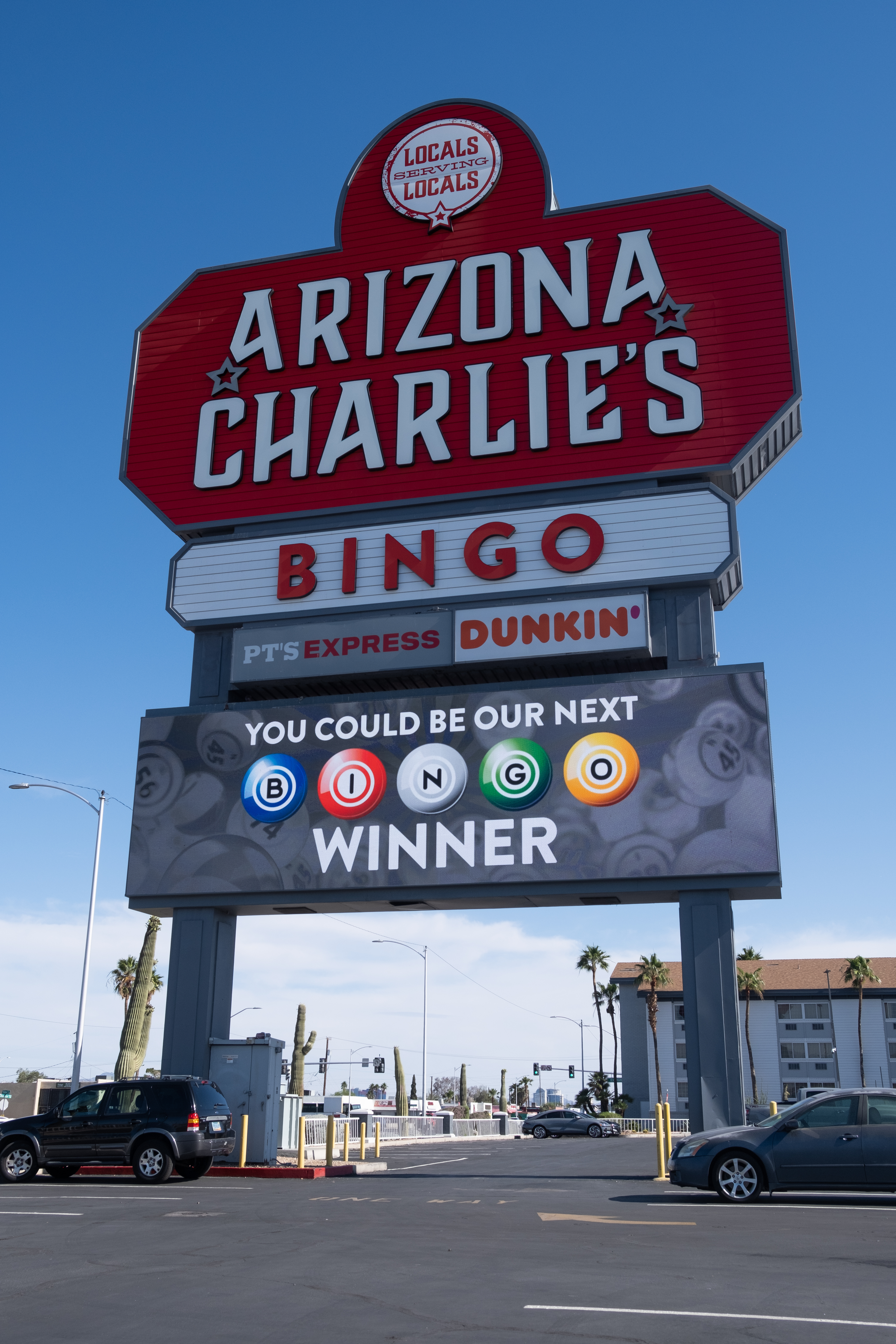
The new Arizona Charlie's sign, which was updated in 2021.

Bruce Becker hoped to receive a $92 million loan to keep the hotel-casino and to expand it, but this plan fell through in July 1998; the lender declined to provide the funds after closely examining the property's financial prospects. Icahn took it over soon thereafter. Becker reached a deal with Icahn to buy back the hotel-casino by the end of 1999, and Station also made further proposals to purchase it, but neither effort panned out.

Ron Lurie, who served as mayor of Las Vegas from 1987 to 1991, later worked at Arizona Charlie's. In the late 1990s, he was serving as the property's marketing director, and soon thereafter became general manager. He replaced Becker, who had briefly remained as manager until January 1999.

By 2004, ownership had been transferred to Icahn's new company, American Casino & Entertainment Properties (ACEP). In 2008, Icahn sold the company and its properties to Whitehall Street Real Estate Funds, an affiliate of Goldman Sachs. In 2017, ACEP was acquired by Golden Entertainment.

In 2021, Arizona Charlie's Decatur underwent a new "Locals Serving Locals" advertising campaign, with the property and brand image being entirely upgraded to a new modernized design. The property's original roadside sign, which includes an image of Arizona Charlie, was donated to the city's Neon Museum for preservation.

In 2026, Vici Properties acquired the real estate of Arizona Charlie's and leased it back to Golden Entertainment, as part of Golden's going-private transaction.

== Property overview ==
Arizona Charlie's has 258 rooms and a 55,227 sq ft (5,130.8 m^{2}) casino, which includes a bingo room. As of 2007, the hotel-casino had 800 employees. The property is popular among locals for its food and gaming, as well as live entertainment. During the 1990s, it hosted many boxing matches.

An Outback Steakhouse opened in the casino in 2007. In 2010, the casino opened Ron's Steakhouse, named after Lurie. A renovation in 2021 introduced several new dining options, including a Dunkin' Donuts.

In 2023, a River Rock Pizza & Pasta opened at the property. The restaurant chain originally opened at the Aquarius Casino Resort in Laughlin, another Golden Entertainment property.

== Other locations ==
By 1998, Becker Gaming was also operating several bars and restaurants around the Las Vegas Valley under the "Charlie's" name, such as Charlie's Lakeside.

A second hotel-casino property, Arizona Charlie's Boulder, is located along Boulder Highway in the east Las Vegas Valley. It opened in 2000, as Arizona Charlie's East. The original property was renamed Arizona Charlie's West, and became Arizona Charlie's Decatur in 2003.
