= Rocky Gap =

Rocky Gap may refer to:

- Rocky Gap, Virginia
- Rocky Gap State Park in Allegany County, Maryland.
- Rocky Gap in Mountain passes in Montana
