= Western Company of North America =

The Western Company of North America (1939-1995) was a petroleum industry services company formerly based in Texas. It was one of the pioneers of the "acidizing process", a method of improving the flow from natural gas and oil wells.

== History ==
In 1939, after working as a Sales Engineer with Reed Roller Bit Company in Houston, Eddie Chiles founded the Western Company of North America in Fort Worth, Texas. He started the company with two trucks and three employees. Western served the petroleum industry with technical services required in the discovery and production of oil and gas.

The company grew to become a major oil services firm, primarily in acidizing, fracturing, and cementing. At its peak, the Western Company had over 5,000 employees and annual worldwide revenues of over $500 million. Western also featured an innovative television campaign with commercials telling viewers "If you don't have an oil well, get one—you'll love doing business with Western!"

The Western Company also operated an offshore drilling company, run by Chiles' brother, during the 1970s. The offshore drilling company was sold to Noble Drilling in 1991.

The Western Company moved from Fort Worth to Houston in 1990. The company featured an innovative oil museum open to the public on the first floor of their office building in Fort Worth, which was moved to Beaumont, Texas.

The Western Company of North America was sold to BJ Services in 1995. The founder of the company, Eddie Chiles, died on August 22 1993 in Fort Worth.

== See also ==
- Oil companies of the United States
