= Brett Icahn =

American Businessman

- Born: August 19, 1979 (age 46)
- Education: Choate Rosemary Hall
- Alma mater: Princeton University
- Occupations: Businessman, investor
- Parent(s): Carl Icahn; Liba Trejbal

Brett Icahn (born August 19, 1979) is an American businessman, investor, and philanthropist.

== Early life ==
His father is billionaire investor Carl Icahn (born 1936), majority shareholder of Icahn Enterprises, and his mother is Liba Trejbal, a former ballerina from Czechoslovakia. He graduated from Choate Rosemary Hall and Princeton University.

== Career ==
Icahn interned at Goldman Sachs. Shortly after, he directed art films. In 2001, he founded Myelin Media. He joined his father's company, Icahn Enterprises, in 2002. Since June 2004, he has been an investment analyst for Icahn Partners LP, Icahn Master, Icahn Master II and Icahn Master III and Icahn Partners Master Fund LP. He co-manages a hedge fund with David Schechter, which includes the Sargon portfolio from his father's company. Icahn and Schechter have invested heavily in Apple and Netflix shares. In 2011, his hedge fund had a return of 50 percent.

He is Vice President of Modal LLC. He was on the Board of Directors of American Railcar Industries since January 16, 2007, the Hain Celestial Group since July 2010, the Cadus Corporation since July 1, 2010, Motricity since January, 2010, Bausch Health since March 2021 and Bausch + Lomb Corporation since June 2022. He also serves on the board of Take-Two Interactive and HowStuffWorks.

Icahn played an instrumental role in his father's company's attempted takeover of Lions Gate.

== Personal life ==
Icahn resides on Long Island, New York. In 2012, his father gave him management responsibility for US$3 billion.
