= Golden Entertainment =

American gaming company

Golden Entertainment, Inc.
- Company type: Private
- Industry: Gaming
- Predecessor: Golden Gaming; Lakes Entertainment
- Founded: August 3, 2015; 10 years ago
- Headquarters: Enterprise, Nevada, U.S.
- Key people: Blake Sartini (CEO)
- Brands: PT's
- Owner: Blake Sartini
- Number of employees: 7,200 (2015)
- Website: goldenent.com

Golden Entertainment, Inc. is an American gambling company based in Enterprise, Nevada that operates casinos and taverns. It was formed in 2015 by the merger of Golden Gaming (founded in 2001 by Blake Sartini) and Lakes Entertainment. It is the largest tavern operator in Nevada. In October 2017, the company completed an $850 million acquisition of American Casino & Entertainment Properties. The company now has eight casino resorts, all located in Southern Nevada.

== History ==
Golden Gaming was formed in October 2001 as a result of Blake L. Sartini's acquisition of Southwest Gaming Services, a company he founded before selling to Station Casinos.

In 2002, the Golden Tavern Group subsidiary was formed, and it acquired the PT's chain of taverns.

In 2004, the company acquired three casinos in Black Hawk, Colorado: the Golden Gates, Golden Gulch, and Golden Mardi Gras.

In 2006, Golden Gaming acquired the Pahrump Nugget Hotel & Gambling Hall from Generation 2000.

In February 2007, Golden began a two-year deal to operate the casino at the Hard Rock Hotel while its new owner, Morgans Hotel Group, applied for a gaming license. Golden paid $20.7 million a year to lease the casino, and received a $3.3 million monthly management fee, plus a portion of revenue. Golden pulled out of the deal early when Morgans received its gaming license in January 2008, citing a desire to focus on its other operations.

Golden Gaming agreed in November 2007 to buy the Saddle West casino in Pahrump from Anthony Marnell III and Sher Gaming, but canceled the deal the following June, deciding instead to focus on the Pahrump Nugget, where it began an $11 million expansion and remodeling.

In 2010, Golden Gaming agreed to take over operation of four small casinos owned by The Siegel Group, previously operated by United Coin: the Gold Spike, Siegel Slots and Suites, the Resort on Mount Charleston, and Rumor.

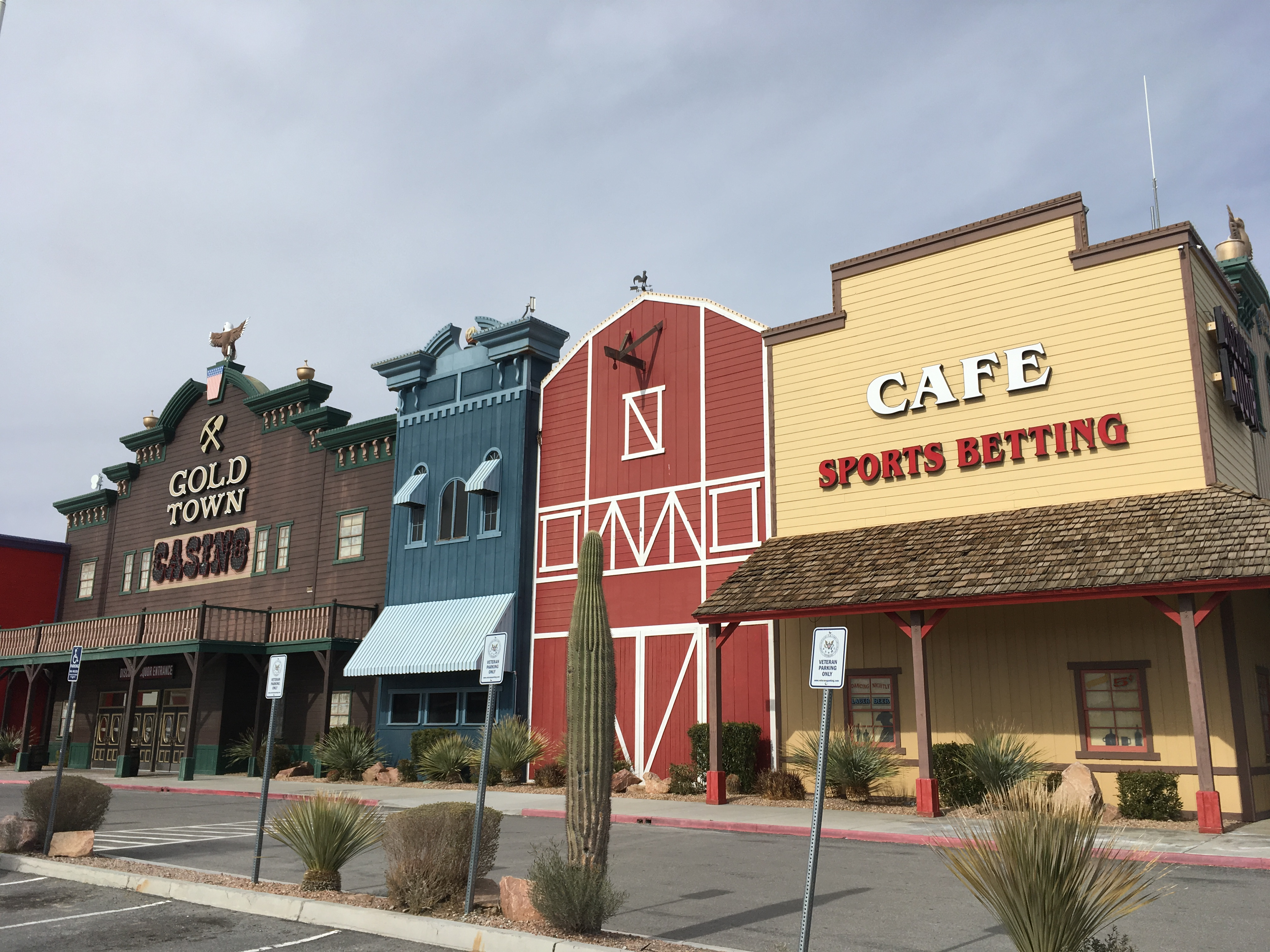
Gold Town Casino in Pahrump, Nevada, the former Terrible's Town Casino, seen in 2019, which Golden Gaming acquired in 2012

In March 2012, Golden bought from Affinity Gaming the Terrible's Town Casino and Terrible's Lakeside Casino & RV Park in Pahrump and Affinity's slot route operation (except for Terrible Herbst locations). The deal made Golden the largest employer and largest gaming operator in Nye County, and the largest slot route operator in Nevada, with about 8,500 machines in 650 locations, making up 45% of the market. Affinity in turn bought Golden's three casinos in Black Hawk, which were valued at a total of $76–92 million.

Golden Gaming agreed in January 2015 to merge with Lakes Entertainment. Sartini would own 35% of the company and serve as its chief executive officer. The merger was completed on August 3, 2015, establishing Golden Entertainment.

The company expanded into Montana in 2016, purchasing slot routes with 2,800 machines for a total of $45 million. In June 2017, Golden Entertainment was granted a license for slot route operations in Illinois. This marked the fourth state Golden is licensed.

In October 2017, Golden Entertainment acquired American Casino & Entertainment Properties for $850 million, which expanded the company's casino portfolio by four: the Stratosphere, Arizona Charlie's Boulder, Arizona Charlie's Decatur and the Aquarius Casino Resort. The following year, the company announced a $140 million renovation of the Stratosphere.

In January 2019, the company bought the Colorado Belle and Edgewater casinos in Laughlin, Nevada from Marnell Gaming (owner and operator of Nugget Casino Resort in Sparks) for $190 million. The acquisition of the Colorado Belle and Edgewater gives the company dominance in the market with three of 11 Laughlin properties, including the Aquarius.

In 2020, Golden completed a revitalization of the Stratosphere and rebranded the company as The Strat Hotel, Casino & Tower.

Golden sold the Rocky Gap Casino Resort in 2023 to Vici Properties and Century Casinos for $260 million. Also in 2023, Golden sold its Nevada and Montana slot routes to J&J Ventures.

In 2026, Golden Entertainment went private through a deal with Sartini and Vici Properties. The real estate of seven of Golden's casinos was sold to Vici in a leaseback deal for $1.16 billion, while Sartini and his family purchased the rest of the company's operating business.

== Divisions ==
=== Golden Casino Group ===
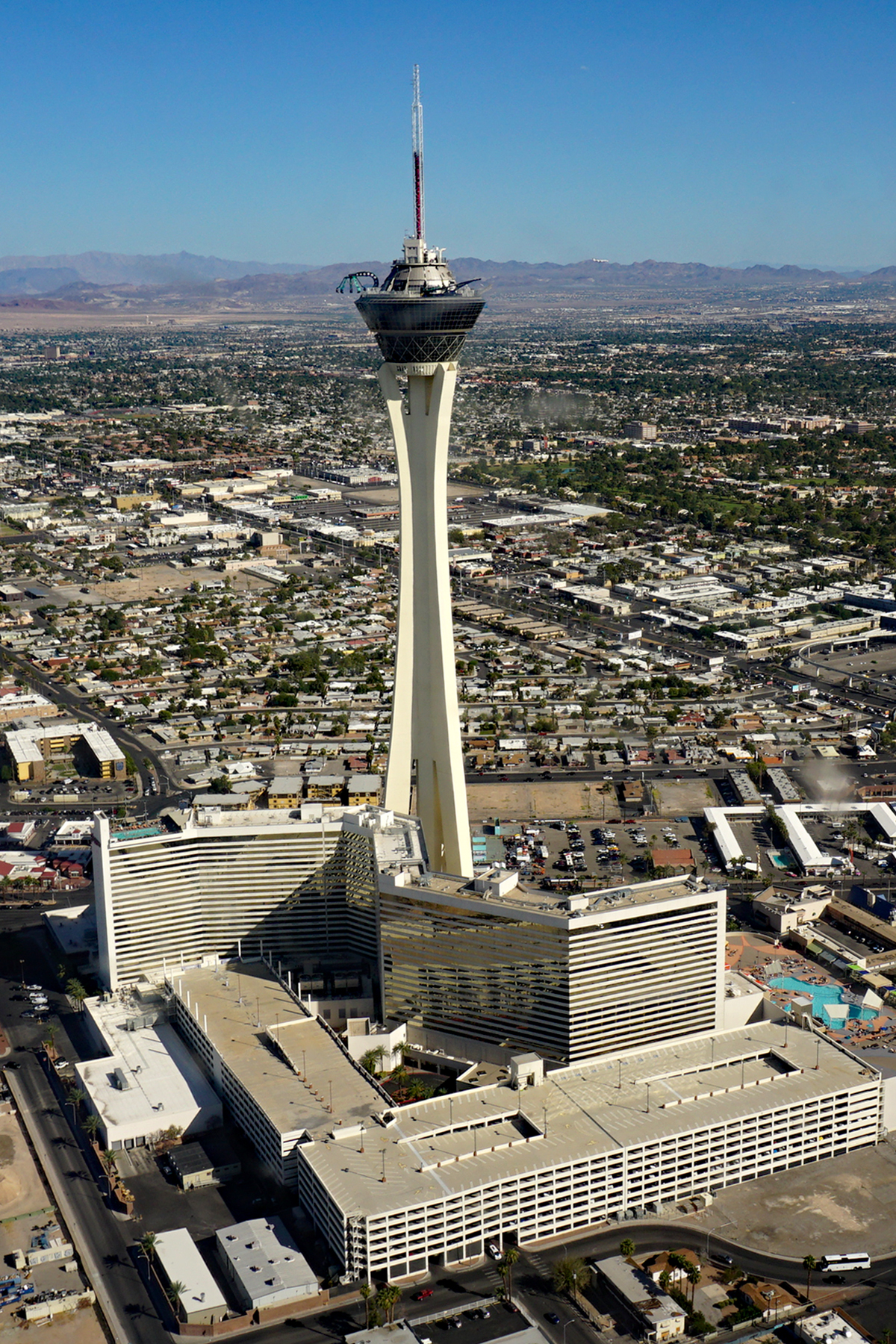
The Strat Hotel (formerly the Stratosphere), seen in 2017, is the company's largest property.

- Aquarius Casino Resort — Laughlin, Nevada
- Arizona Charlie's Boulder — Las Vegas, Nevada
- Arizona Charlie's Decatur — Las Vegas, Nevada
- Edgewater Hotel and Casino — Laughlin, Nevada
- Gold Town Casino — Pahrump, Nevada
- Lakeside Casino & RV Park — Pahrump, Nevada
- Pahrump Nugget Hotel & Gambling Hall — Pahrump, Nevada
- The Strat Hotel, Casino and Tower — Las Vegas, Nevada

=== PT's Taverns ===
- Great American Pub
  - Las Vegas (3 locations)
- Lucky's
  - Henderson (1 location)
  - Las Vegas (2 locations)
  - Reno (1 location)
- PT's Gold
  - Henderson (5 locations)
  - Las Vegas (24 locations)
  - North Las Vegas (2 locations)
- PT's Place
  - Las Vegas (3 locations)
- PT's Pub
  - Henderson (1 locations)
  - Las Vegas (15 locations)
- PT's Ranch
  - Las Vegas (3 locations)
- Sean Patrick's
  - Las Vegas (2 locations)
  - North Las Vegas (2 locations)
- SG Bar
  - Las Vegas (1 location)
- Sierra Gold
  - Las Vegas (4 locations)
  - Henderson (1 location)
  - Reno (2 locations)

=== Former ===
- Colorado Belle — Laughlin, Nevada
- Golden Gates Casino — Black Hawk, Colorado
- Golden Gulch Casino — Black Hawk, Colorado
- Golden Mardi Gras Casino — Black Hawk, Colorado
- Rocky Gap Resort Casino — Flintstone, Maryland
