= Arizona Charlie's Boulder =

Hotel and casino in Nevada, United States

Coordinates: 36°07′27″N 115°04′32″W

- Interactive map of Arizona Charlie's Boulder
- Location: Paradise, Nevada, U.S.; 4575 Boulder Highway
- Opened: 1991 (hotel); May 23, 2000; 26 years ago (casino)
- No. of rooms: 300
- Gaming space: 47,541 sq ft (4,416.7 m^{2})
- Casino type: Land-based
- Owner: Vici Properties
- Operating license holder: Golden Entertainment
- Previous names: Arizona Charlie's East (2000–2003)
- Renovated in: 1998, 2001, 2006
- Website: www.arizonacharliesboulder.com

Arizona Charlie's Boulder is a hotel and locals casino in Paradise, Nevada, part of the Las Vegas Valley. The hotel-casino is located on Boulder Highway, also known as the Boulder Strip. It includes a 47,541 sq ft (4,416.7 m^{2}) casino, 300 rooms, and an RV park. It is a sister property to the older Arizona Charlie's Decatur, located to the west in Las Vegas. Both are named after Arizona Charlie, a distant relative of the Becker family, who developed the original property.

Arizona Charlie's Boulder opened as a non-gaming hotel in 1991, known then as Sunrise Fountain Suites. The RV park was added five years later. The casino was built in 1998, but did not open as scheduled, due to problems acquiring a gaming license. Businessman Carl Icahn, who owned the original Arizona Charlie's at the time, purchased Sunrise Suites and renamed it Arizona Charlie's East, opening the casino on May 23, 2000. The hotel-casino was renamed Arizona Charlie's Boulder in 2003, and was sold to Golden Entertainment in 2017.

== History ==
The property began as a non-gaming hotel known as Sunrise Fountain Suites, opened in 1991. It was owned by Michael Mona Jr. and his wife Rhonda. In 1996, they added a 239-space RV park just north of the hotel. Two years later, they added a new structure with gaming space and various restaurants, A four-level parking garage was also built. The expansion was funded with a $30 million loan.

The Sunrise Suites casino featured a Mediterranean theme, and was scheduled to debut on December 27, 1998. However, the Monas withdrew their gaming license application two weeks before the opening, following scrutiny from the Nevada Gaming Control Board. Michael Mona had previously been associated with men who had links to organized crime, and the board was also concerned about Mona's accounting practices. In March 1999, Sunrise Suites filed for Chapter 11 bankruptcy. While the casino had never opened, the hotel and RV park continued operations throughout the bankruptcy proceedings.

In January 2000, Sunrise Suites was auctioned to businessman Carl Icahn, who owned the original Arizona Charlie's hotel-casino in Las Vegas, west of Boulder Highway. Icahn planned to rename Sunrise Suites as Arizona Charlie's East, a sister property to the original location, which became Arizona Charlie's West. Icahn's $43 million bid included the RV park, and he spent another $12 million on improvements and equipment. Most of the original design elements were left in place, including chandeliers and ornate columns, making it among the higher-end properties on the Boulder Strip. This was also in contrast to the original, lower-end Arizona Charlie's. Like the original location, the new property would appeal to locals with cheap food and entertainment, as well as favorable gaming odds. Both featured a western theme. The casino opened on May 23, 2000, shortly after 9:00 p.m., with a fireworks show to mark the event. It included an entertainment venue, two restaurants, a buffet, and a food court with two outlets.

Profits improved under Icahn's ownership. An expansion, adding a bingo hall and other casino space, began construction in 2001. The property was renamed Arizona Charlie's Boulder on January 1, 2003, while the original location became Arizona Charlie's Decatur. By 2004, ownership had been transferred to Icahn's new company, American Casino & Entertainment Properties (ACEP). An $8.3 million expansion took place in 2006, enlarging the front area to add more gaming space. In 2008, Icahn sold ACEP and its properties to Whitehall Street Real Estate Funds, an affiliate of Goldman Sachs. In October 2017, Golden Entertainment acquired Arizona Charlie's Boulder as part of its $850 million purchase of ACEP. In 2026, Vici Properties acquired the real estate of Arizona Charlie's and leased it back to Golden Entertainment, as part of Golden's going-private transaction.

Arizona Charlie's Boulder occupies 24 acres (9.7 ha), including the RV park. It has a 47,541 sq ft (4,416.7 m^{2}) casino, and the hotel includes 300 rooms.
