= Lake Habeeb =

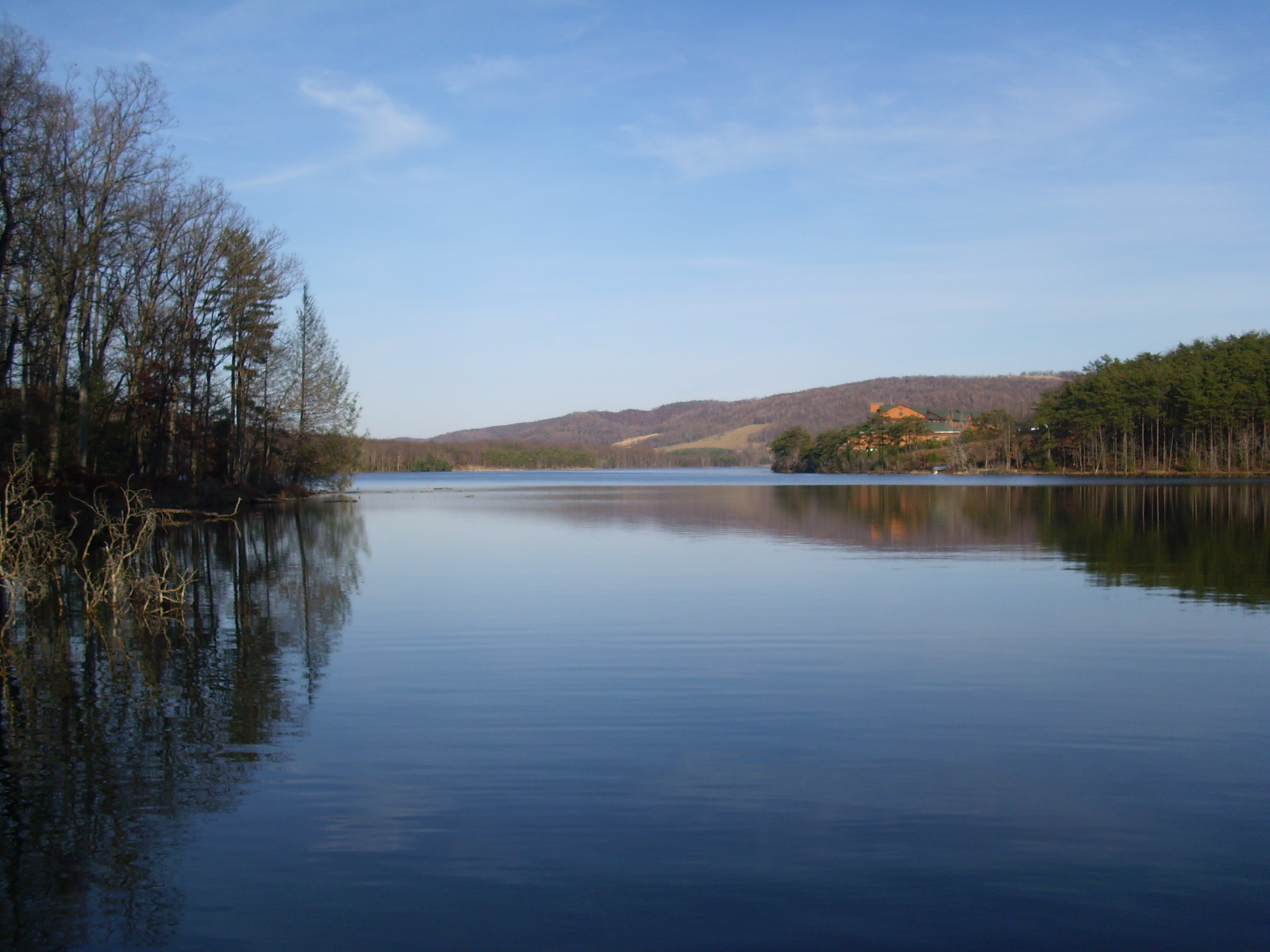

- Location within Maryland Location within the United States
- Location: Allegany County, Maryland
- Coordinates: 39°42′06″N 078°39′41″W
- Type: reservoir
- Primary inflows: Rocky Gap Run
- Basin countries: United States
- Surface area: 243 acres (98 ha)
- Max. depth: 74 ft (23 m)
- Surface elevation: 115 ft (35 m)

Lake Habeeb is a reservoir of 243 acres (0.98 km^{2}) and is located in Allegany County, Maryland, United States. The lake is fed by Rocky Gap Run, and nestled against the east side of the southern tip of Evitts Mountain. The dam was built by the Army Corps of Engineers in 1970 and Rocky Gap State Park formally opened on July 17, 1974, it attains a maximum depth of 74 feet (23 m) near its earthen dam. It offers three public beach areas along Habeeb's 9.4-mile (15.1 km) shoreline, as well as a fishery.

The lake is named after Edward Habeeb, a local florist who helped initiate the development of the area. The lake is now situated within the Rocky Gap State Park, also hosting the Rocky Gap Resort and Golf Course.
