= Locals casino =

Casino marketing technique

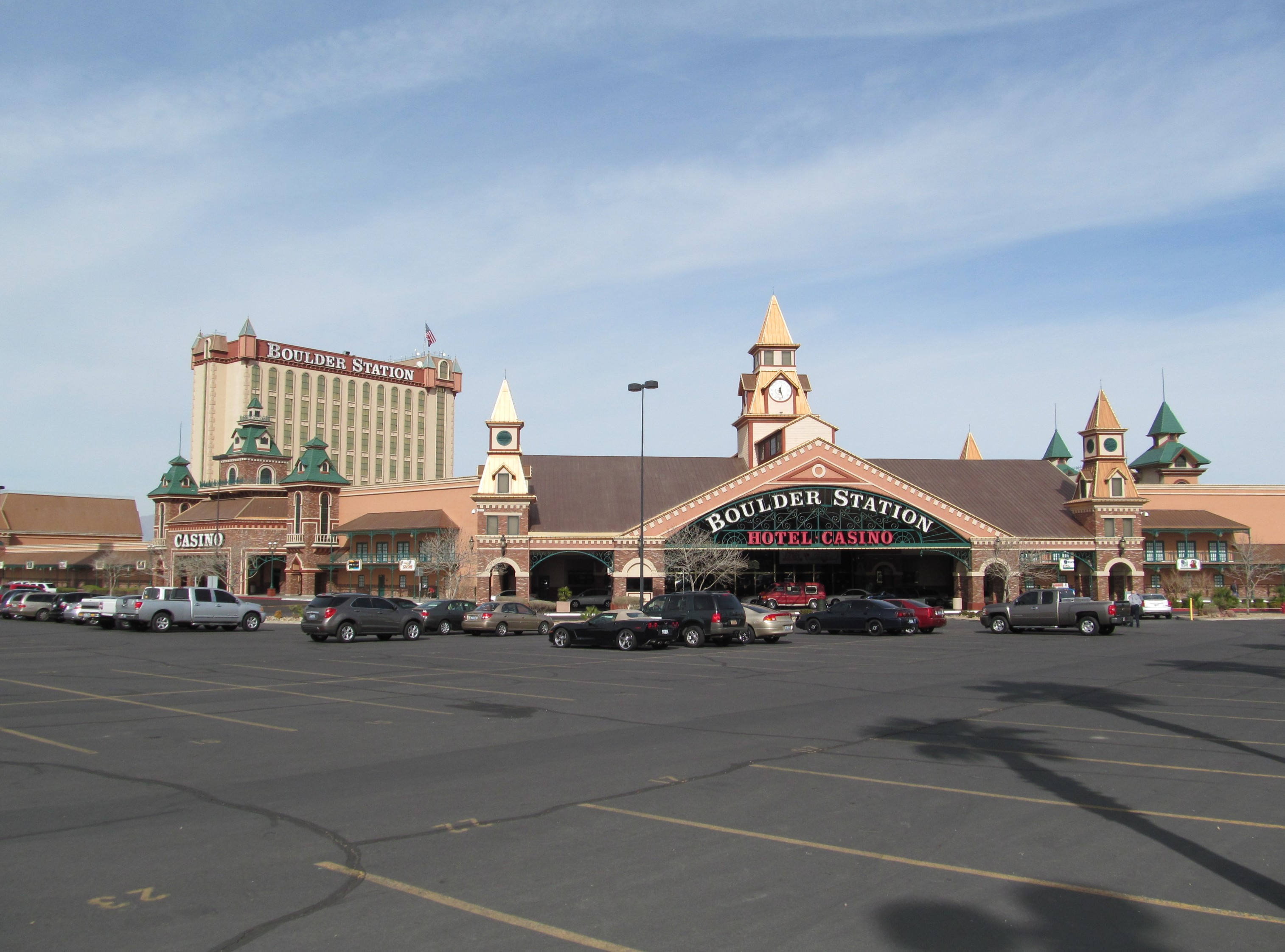
Boulder Station, a locals casino in Sunrise Manor, Nevada, in 2012

A locals casino is a casino designed primarily to attract residents of the area in which it was built rather than tourists or vacationers. The term is most commonly associated with casinos in Nevada, United States, to distinguish them from casinos that target mostly tourists in a central area. Locals casinos tend to operate under slightly different business models than those frequented by tourists, most notably having lower house advantages.

Locals casinos may also have amenities to appeal to tourists, such as lodging, truck parking, and expanded dining options. Many traditional tourist casinos have tried to appeal to locals, sometimes offering more generous comps for local residents, and providing community-oriented amenities such as shopping options and movie theaters that are the typical hallmarks of locals casinos.

== Overview ==
Locals casinos can range from locations with fewer than 15 machines such as supermarkets, convenience stores, gas stations, bars or lounges with no lodging, to resorts that have hundreds of machines and hotels with hundreds of rooms. Larger locals casinos in the Las Vegas Valley include the M Resort, South Point, Silverton, the two Arizona Charlie's casinos, all or most of the casinos owned and operated by Boyd Gaming, and all or most of those owned and operated by Station Casinos.

== Attracting residents ==
In order to attract residents to gamble, locals casinos try to differentiate themselves from tourist-oriented casinos to benefit gamblers. For example, locals casinos usually have a different mix of games or offer games not typically found in tourist-oriented casinos in the area, such as bingo. Additionally, they offer table games with lower minimum bets, as well as lower denomination slot machines and video poker.

In addition, table games rules are frequently adjusted to decrease the house advantage and the payout percentage on slot and video poker machines is increased; locals casinos are well known for offering more full-pay video poker machines, and even machines that pay more than 100%.

Locals casinos will typically offer comps, such as free meals at the casino's restaurants, at a higher rate than tourist-oriented casinos. Additionally, many locals casinos have promotions such as payroll check cashing, frequently accompanied by some type of free play bonus, to get patrons into the casino. In Nevada, this is usually expanded with special promotions to cash tax refund checks from the Internal Revenue Service.

Locals casinos often act as community centers and frequently include non-gambling entertainment such as bowling alleys, movie theaters, ice skating rinks and child care centers.

== Revenue of casinos ==
The revenue of locals casinos in Clark County, Nevada, is normally calculated by taking the revenue of Clark County and subtracting the revenue of the four tourist areas (the Strip, Downtown, Laughlin, and Mesquite). This is the only realistic calculation available, since the Nevada Gaming Commission does not provide more detail. However, this calculation will include some properties like Gold Strike, Hoover Dam Lodge, Primm Valley Resorts and all the various casinos in Laughlin and Mesquite as "locals casinos" even though they have many guests who are visiting the area.
