= Pokertek =

PokerTekInc
- Type: Public Incorporated
- Industry: Casino games
- Founded: 2003
- Headquarters: Matthews, North Carolina
- Products: Automated gaming systems
- Website: pokertek.com

PokerTek was a company that developed the PokerPro electronic poker table and Heads-Up Challenge video game, as well as related software applications.

The PokerPro table were introduced at casinos in dozens of countries as well as cruise ships. Introduction of PokerPro tables at Trump Plaza raised concerns among dealers about their job security.

The Heads-Up Challenge video game was co-branded with the World Series of Poker.

Pokertek was the exclusive provider of automated poker tables for Harrah's Entertainment and Ameristar Casinos.

Aristocrat Leisure was Pokertek's exclusive provider for countries outside of the United States and Canada.

In 2014, PokerTek was sold to Multimedia Games (of Austin, Texas) for $13,500,000.
