= Grand Casinos =

Gaming industry

Grand Casinos Inc.
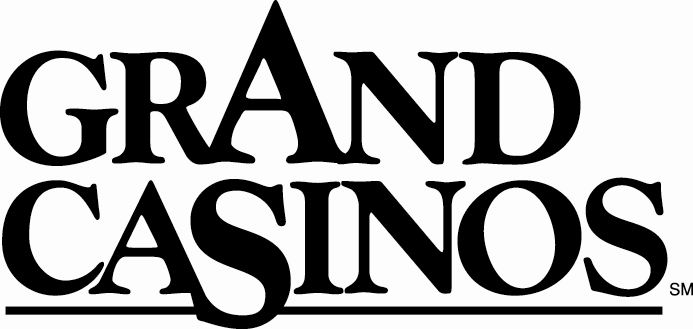
- Industry: Gaming
- Founded: 1990
- Defunct: 1998; 28 years ago
- Fate: Acquired
- Successor: Park Place Entertainment; Grand Casino Minnesota
- Headquarters: Minnesota, USA
- Key people: Lyle Berman and Dave Anderson

Grand Casinos (NYSE: GND) was a casino operator, co-founded by poker player Lyle Berman and Dave Anderson, Founder of Famous Dave's BBQ Restaurants, that started out managing several casinos in Minnesota in 1990.

The company ceased to exist when it was purchased by Hilton Hotels which then merged it with its other gaming properties to form Park Place Entertainment in 1998.

== History ==
Grand Casinos owned a total of 8 casinos in 1995.

On December 19, 1995, made a major equity investment in The Stratosphere.

In connection with AirTran Airways, Grand Casinos began offering vacation packages on AirTran August 8, 2005.

== Enterprises owned ==
- Biloxi Star Theater
- Grand Casino Gulfport
- Grand Casino Biloxi
- Grand Casino Tunica

== Casinos operated ==
- Grand Casino Mille Lacs
- Grand Casino Hinckley
- Grand Casino Avoyelles
- Grand Casino Coushatta
