= Rocky Gap State Park =

State park in Maryland, United States

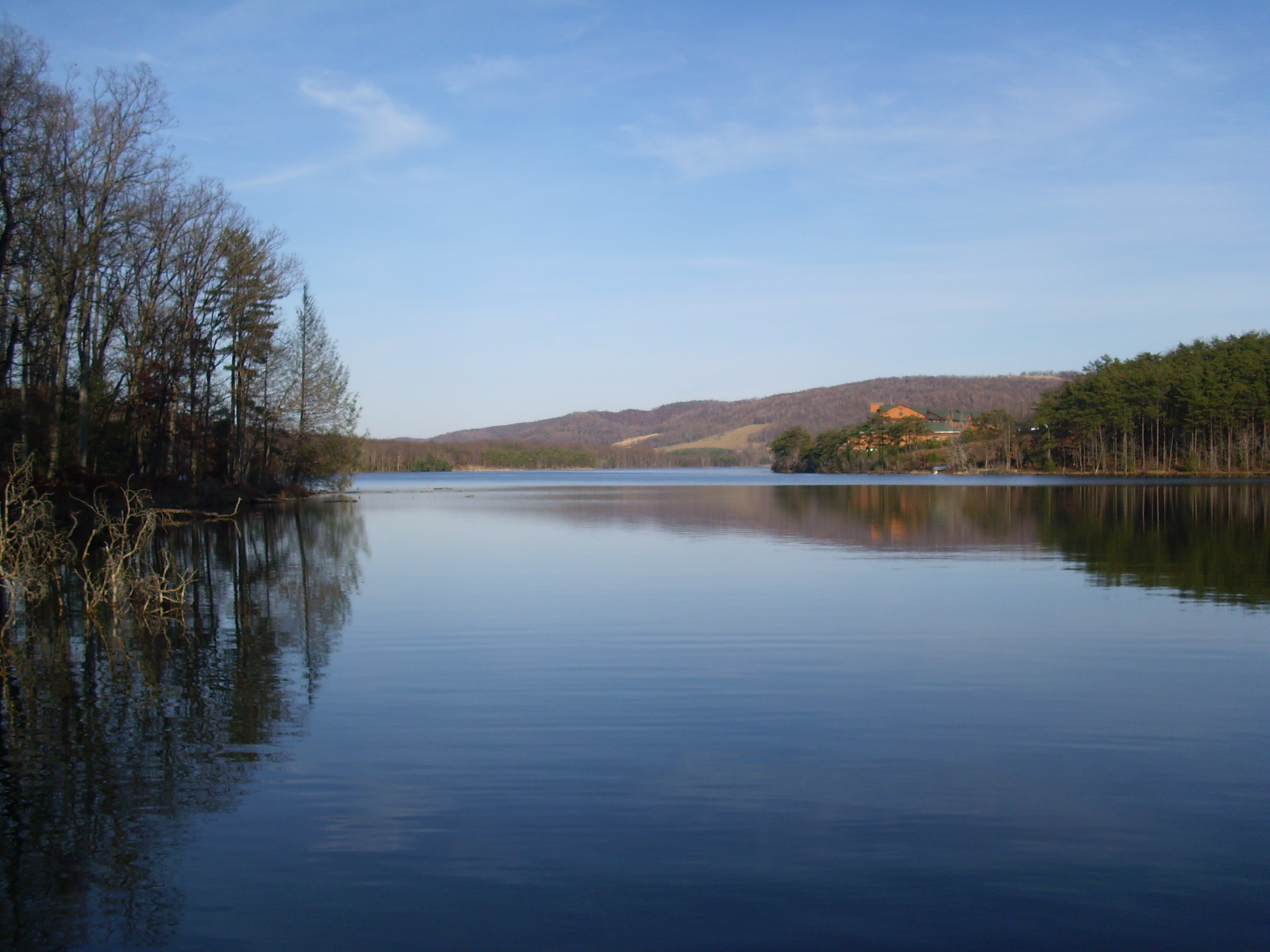
- Lake Habeeb

- Location within Maryland Location within the United States
- Location: Allegany County, Maryland, United States
- Nearest city: Cumberland, Maryland
- Coordinates: 39°42′17″N 78°39′06″W
- Area: 3,119 acres (1,262 ha)
- Elevation: 1,168 ft (356 m)
- Established: 1963
- Administrator: Maryland Department of Natural Resources
- Designation: Maryland state park
- Website: Official website

Rocky Gap State Park is a Maryland state park with resort features located on Interstate 68 (exit 50), seven miles (11 km) east of Cumberland in Allegany County, Maryland. The park's 3,000 acres (1,200 ha) include Lake Habeeb, Evitts Mountain, and the privately owned and operated Rocky Gap Casino Resort. The park offers water recreation, camping facilities, and hiking trails. The park is managed by the Maryland Department of Natural Resources, the resort by Century Casinos.

== History ==
The park originated with the donation of land by Edward Habeeb and others for the creation of a state park at Rocky Gap. Initial state purchases began in 1963 with land acquisition continuing until 1966. In 1970, the Army Corps of Engineers dammed Rocky Gap Run to create Lake Habeeb. The park opened in 1974.

=== Casino Resort ===
The Rocky Gap Resort and Golf Course was developed in 1998 by the Maryland Economic Development Corporation (MEDCO), an agency created in 1984 that allows the State of Maryland to directly own or develop property for economic benefit. The facility opened in April 1998 at a cost of $53.9 million. The resort failed to sustain its early success, began posting losses, and became dependent on MEDCO subsidies to stay in operation.

In 2009, the state's initial effort to open a casino in Rocky Gap State Park failed when the only bidder, Empire Resorts, did not pay the required $4.5 million licensing fee. Empire's contingent bid was based on Maryland altering its 67 percent tax on casinos—one of the highest in the United States. In 2011, legislators lowered the state’s share of slots revenue at Rocky Gap from 67 percent to 50 percent. A casino license was awarded in April 2012 to Evitts Resort LLC, a subsidiary of Lakes Entertainment of Minnetonka, Minnesota, which completed purchase of the existing resort, including the 200-room lakeside lodge, the Jack Nicklaus-designed 18-hole golf course, and other features, from the state in August 2012. The sale price was reported at less than $7 million. Additionally, the company entered into a 40-year lease on 260 acres (110 ha) from the Maryland Department of Natural Resources. The renamed Rocky Gap Casino Resort opened on May 22, 2013, with 558 (of the originally planned 850) slot machines and 10 live table games. In 2015, Lakes Entertainment entered into an agreement to merge with the parent company of Golden Gaming. In 2023, Golden Entertainment sold the property's operations to Century Casinos and its land and buildings to Vici Properties. As of April 2026, the casino operates 629 gaming devices and 12 table games. The hotel has 196 rooms and suites.

== Activities and amenities ==
The park's man-made Lake Habeeb covers 243 acres (98 ha) and sports white sand beaches. It sits below Evitts Mountain and is fed by Rocky Gap Run. Boats (electric motors only) are allowed on Lake Habeeb 24 hours a day, seven days a week, and a fee is assessed. The park offers paddle boats, kayaks, and canoes for rent. Fish most commonly caught by anglers at Lake Habeeb include largemouth bass, smallmouth bass, black crappie, rainbow trout, brown trout, channel catfish, bluegill, redear sunfish, and pumpkinseed.

Hiking trails include the four-mile (6 km) Lakeside Trail and the five-mile (8 km) Evitt's Homesite Trail, which climbs Evitts Mountain amid streams with hemlock, mountain laurel and rhododendron growing nearby. The quarter-mile Touch of Nature Trail is a paved route to an accessible fishing dock.

The park's amphitheater and concert stage can be rented. Its seating capacity is 3,000, and the stage area is 42 feet (13 m) by 60 feet (18 m). The stage was built as a permanent home for the Rocky Gap Country Bluegrass Festival (1988-2001) but was never used for those shows.

== Gallery ==
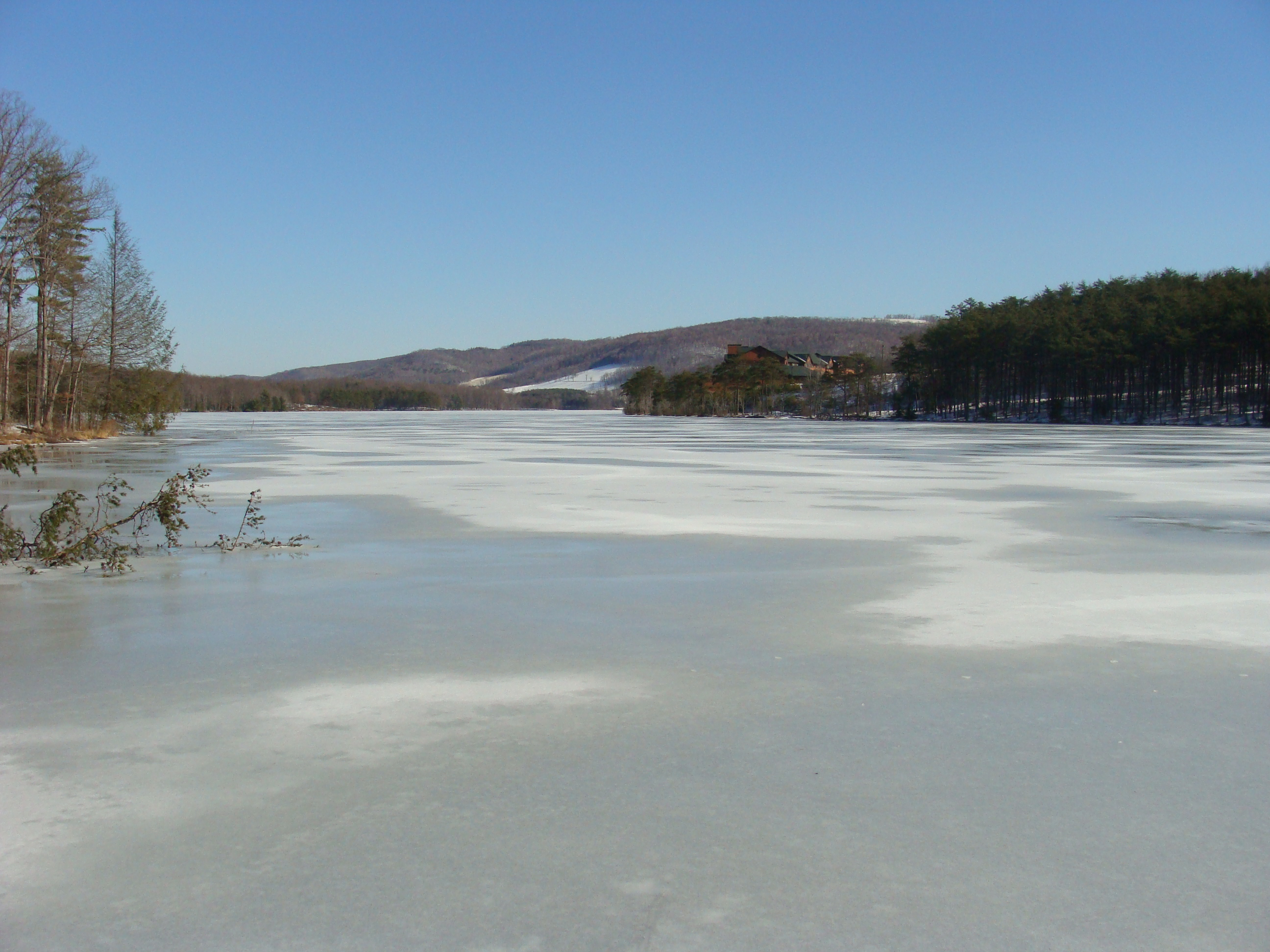
Lake Habeeb frozen over

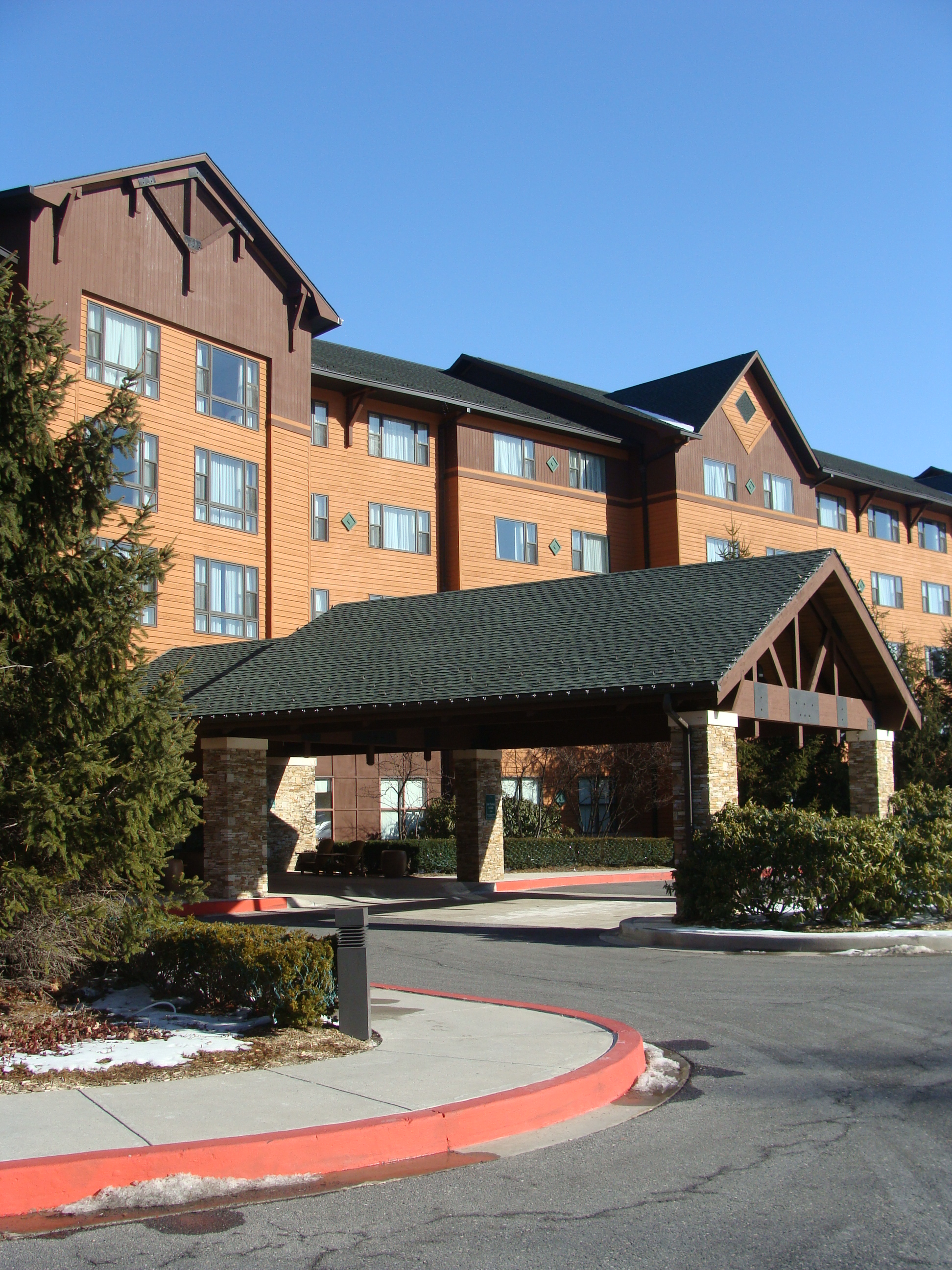
Casino entrance

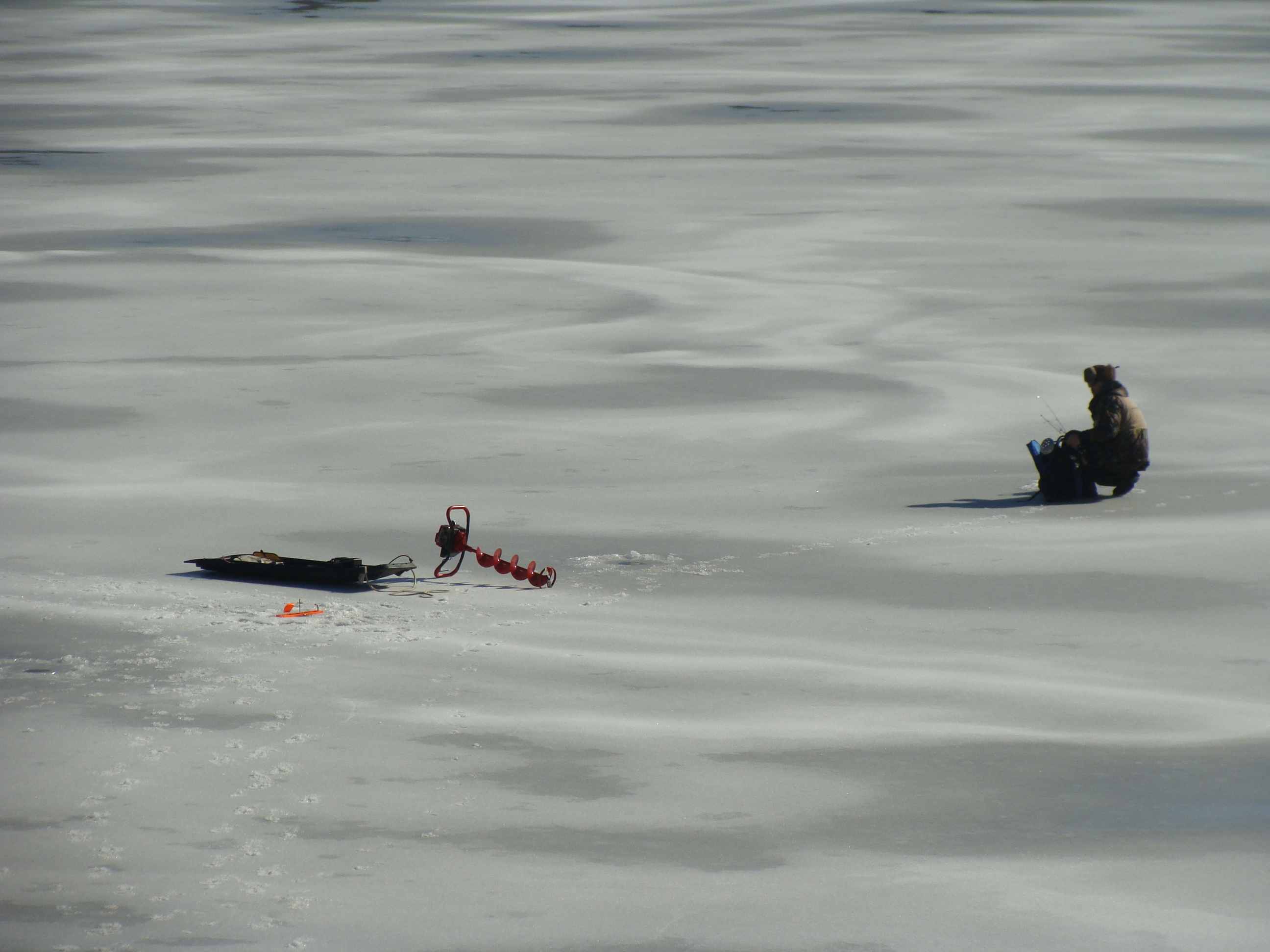
Ice fisherman on Lake Habeeb

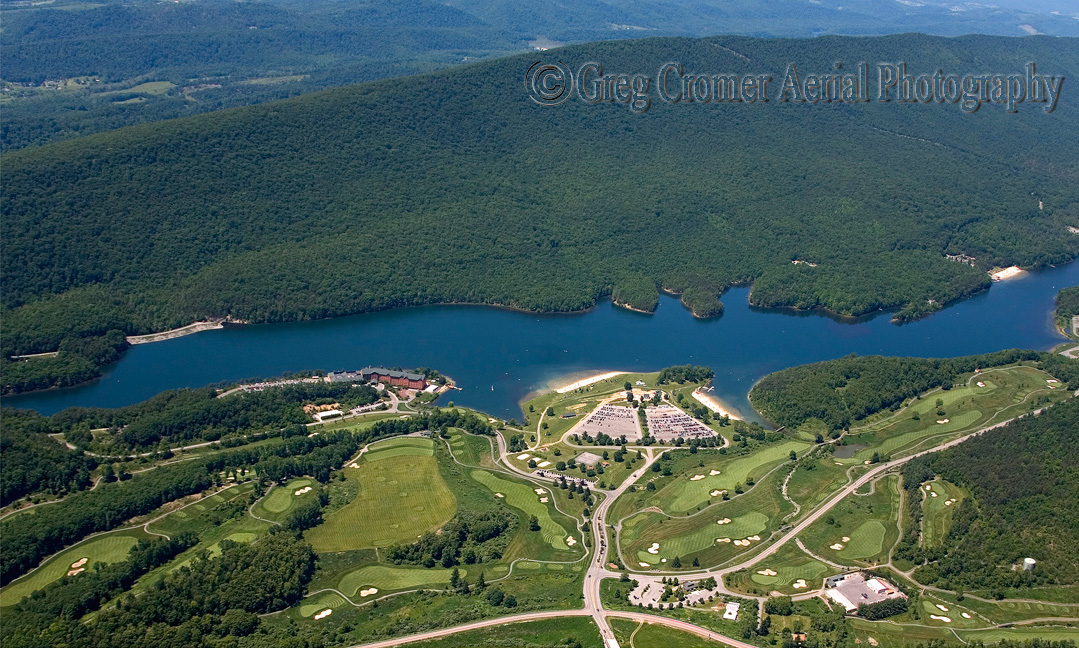
Aerial photo
