= Blake L. Sartini =

American entrepreneur

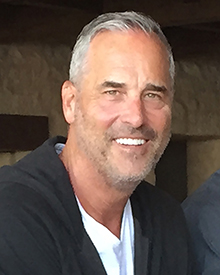

Chairman, President and CEO of Golden Entertainment, Inc.

Personal details
- Born: Blake L. Sartini; January 16, 1959 (age 67) Stockton, California, U.S.
- Spouse: Delise Sartini
- Children: Blake Jr. Lorenzo; Sandra
- Education: University of Nevada, Las Vegas; Business Administration(BA)
- Occupation: Gaming and Entertainment Entrepreneur

Blake L. Sartini, chairman and chief executive officer of Golden Entertainment, Inc. (NASDAQ:GDEN), began his role in 2015 as part of the company’s $341 million merger with Minnesota-based Lakes Entertainment. Before this merger, Sartini served as the president and chief executive officer of Sartini Gaming, established in January 2012; and chief executive officer of Golden Gaming, LLC, which he founded in 2001. Sartini has held notable leadership roles, including executive vice president and chief operating officer at Station Casinos, LLC, where he served as the company’s director from 1993 until 2001. He is a member of the UNLV Foundation’s Board of Trustees and earned a Bachelor of Arts in Business Administration from the University of Nevada, Las Vegas.

Golden Entertainment owns and operates a diversified portfolio of gaming and hospitality assets, including eight casinos and more than 70 gaming taverns in Nevada with more than 5,400 employees, 5,600 slots, 100 table games, and 6,000 hotel rooms in operation.

== Early life ==
Blake L. Sartini was born in Stockton, in the San Joaquin County of California. He is the son of Arthur Dennis Sartini and Sandra Louise Myers. The family moved to Las Vegas in 1964 when his father took a job as the assistant executive director of the Las Vegas Housing Authority. Sartini attended Ed W. Clark High School, where he played football as a tight end and defensive end. He enrolled in the University of Nevada, Las Vegas, and in 1982 earned his bachelor's degree in business administration.

== Career ==
=== Gaming History ===
Sartini began his career as a craps dealer in a downtown Las Vegas hotel and casino. He then worked in various management and executive management positions with several gaming and entertainment companies. His career included working on the Las Vegas Strip at the Barbary Coast Hotel and Casino and ultimately joining Station Casinos Inc., where he held the positions of chief operating officer and director. He was one of the four founding members when it became a public entity in May 1993. When he was COO, the company grew from one property and $150 million in revenue to eight casinos and $850 million in revenue.

=== Golden Gaming/Golden Entertainment ===
In 2002, he formed the Golden Tavern Group subsidiary — now known as PT’s Taverns — and acquired the PT’s chain of taverns. It is now the largest tavern operator in Nevada, with more than 70 locations throughout the state, including all PT’s Pub, Sierra Junction, PT’s Place, PT’s Ranch, Lucky’s, Great American Pub, Sean Patrick’s, PT’s Gold, Sierra Gold and SG Bar taverns.

Golden Gaming agreed in January 2015 to merge with Lakes Entertainment. Sartini would own 35% of the company and serve as its chief executive officer.[17] The merger was completed on August 3, 2015, establishing Golden Entertainment.

In addition to PT's Taverns, Golden Entertainment owns The STRAT Hotel, Casino & Tower, Arizona Charlie’s Decatur and Arizona Charlie’s Boulder in Las Vegas; Aquarius Casino Resort and Edgewater Casino Resort in Laughlin, Nevada; and Pahrump Nugget Hotel & Casino, Lakeside Casino & RV Park and Gold Town Casino in Pahrump, Nevada.

=== History of Golden Gaming/Golden Entertainment ===
Throughout the 1990s Sartini served as president of the Station Casinos subsidiary Southwest Gaming Services, a slot route operator that he founded in 1985. In 2001, he acquired the company from Station Casinos and it became Golden Route Operations, a division of Golden Gaming, LLC.

The Gold Town and Lakeside Casino and RV Park were purchased as part of a larger deal in March 2012 with Affinity Gaming that made Golden Gaming the largest casino operator in Nye County, and also (through Affinity’s slot route business) the largest slot route operator in Nevada. In January 2013, the Nevada Gaming Commission approved the issue of an interactive gaming license to Sartini Synergy Online, the interactive arm of Golden Gaming.

The company expanded into Montana in 2016, purchasing slot routes with 2,800 machines for a total of $45 million.

In February 2016, Golden Entertainment completed its acquisition of Rocky Gap Casino Resort inside Rocky Gap State Park, near Cumberland, Maryland. The 200-room hotel includes a Jack Nicklaus Signature Golf Course.

In June 2017, Golden agreed to purchase American Casino & Entertainment Properties for $850 million, closing the acquisition in October 2017. The acquisition expanded the company’s portfolio with four casinos: the Stratosphere Las Vegas, Arizona Charlie's Boulder, Arizona Charlie's Decatur and the Aquarius Casino Resort. Golden received a gaming license from the Illinois Gaming Board to operate video gaming terminals at bars, restaurants, truck stops and fraternal and veterans’ organizations, marking the fourth state Golden is licensed.

In January 2019, Golden Entertainment closed its $190 million acquisition of Laughlin properties, Colorado Belle and Edgewater.

In 2020 the company renamed the Stratosphere Las Vegas to The STRAT, marking the completion of its $100 million renovation project to upgrade the property's amenities.

Golden sold Rocky Gap Casino Resort to Vici Properties and Century Casinos for $260 million in 2023, then sold its distributed gaming operations in Montana for $109 million to J&J Ventures Gaming, LLC. In November 2023, Golden Entertainment acquired three Lucky’s Tavern locations.

The company announced in January 2024 the sale of its Nevada Distributed Gaming Operations to J&J Ventures Gaming, LLC for approximately $251 million. Golden Entertainment has recently acquired Great American Pub’s two locations.

=== Sartini Enterprises and Service1st Bank ===
In addition to his gaming and entertainment interests, in 2007 Sartini founded a family investment company, Sartini Enterprises, Inc., serving as chairman and CEO, and in the same year co-founded a startup bank called Service1st Bank of Nevada.

The bank was acquired in September 2009 by Global Consumer Acquisition Corp., which soon became Western Liberty Bancorp. Western Liberty in turn was purchased by Western Alliance, the parent company of Bank of Nevada, in August 2012. As its largest shareholder, Sartini was also a board member through its acquisition and took a director role after its acquisition, which he held through 2011.

== Philanthropy ==
Sartini started the Sartini Family Foundation to enable charitable donations and has made significant contributions to the following organizations:

- Bishop Gorman High School
- Nevada Cancer Institute
- Lou Ruvo Center for Brain Health
- Nathan Adelson Hospice
- Stillpoint Spiritual Center
- Opportunity Village
- Public Education Foundation
- University of Nevada, Las Vegas
- Shane Victorino Foundation
- Kurt Busch Foundation

Sartini was the chair of the capital campaign for Bishop Gorman High School, which raised over $50 million toward the construction of a new campus. He is also a member of the Board of Trustees of the University of Nevada, Las Vegas (UNLV) Foundation.

== Personal life ==
Sartini has been married to his wife Delise since 1983. They have three children: Blake Jr., Lorenzo, and Sandra.
