= Arizona Charlie =

American showman (1859–1932)

Abram Meadows
- Born: Abram Henson Meadows; March 10, 1859; Visalia, California, U.S.
- Died: December 9, 1932 (aged 73); Yuma, Arizona, U.S.

Abram Henson Meadows (March 10, 1860 – December 9, 1932), also known as Charlie Meadows and Arizona Charlie, was an American showman and sharpshooter, and a contemporary of "Buffalo Bill" Cody whose Wild West Show inspired Meadows to pursue his own performing career.

Meadows was born on March 10, 1859, along Elbow Creek near modern-day Visalia, California, the 6th of 12 children of John Meadows Sr. After Abraham Lincoln became president, his father changed his name to Charles to move the family to a ranch in Diamond Valley north of Payson, Arizona. On July 15, 1882, John Meadows Sr. was killed by a party of Cibecue Apaches led by Natiotish, who killed his elder brother Henry, leaving him the man of the house. In 1884 Charlie and John C. Chilson organized the Payson Rodeo, in Payson, Arizona which claims to be America's oldest continuous rodeo.

Meadows died on December 9, 1932, in Yuma, Arizona, at the age of 73.

== See also ==
- Arizona Charlie's Boulder
- Arizona Charlie's Decatur
