= Marvin Karlins =

American psychologist (born 1941)

Marvin Karlins (October 4, 1941) is an American psychologist, academic, author, and consultant known for his work and research in behavioral psychology, aviation safety, management education, and popular writing. He is a Professor of Management at the University of South Florida.

== Biography ==
He was born on October 4, 1941, in Minneapolis, Minnesota. He received his B.A. degree from the University of Minnesota and his Ph.D. in Psychology from Princeton University.His doctoral research examined conceptual complexity and creativity in problem-solving tasks and was later published in the Journal of Personality and Social Psychology.

He has been affiliated for over 50 years with the University of South Florida, where he serves as a professor of management in the Muma College of Business.

== Research ==
His early work on stereotypes and creativity, including the widely cited 1969 study “On the Fading of Social Stereotypes,” contributed to social psychology research. He later produced influential work in aviation psychology, including studies of pilot stress, communication, and crew resource management, and helped develop the OASIS training program for integrated airline teamwork.

In aviation psychology, Karlins produced pioneering research on pilot behavior, stress, and communication. His 1989 article “The Spousal Factor in Pilot Stress,” published in Aviation, Space, and Environmental Medicine, introduced perspectives on external stressors affecting pilot performance. He also co-developed the “Aircrew Behavioral Compass,” a model for categorizing pilot behavioral styles, and contributed to early crew resource management (CRM) training programs

== Poker career ==
Karlins has also been active in the professional poker community as a player, author, and commentator. He has appeared on televised events including the World Poker Tour and the World Series of Poker Main Event. He has authored and co-authored books on poker and served for ten years as an editor and columnist for Gambling Times magazine.

He has also been involved in promoting poker education, serving as a mentor to students through the University of South Florida’s poker club and acting as an ambassador for poker organizations.

== Awards and recognition ==
He has been awarded the University of South Florida Presidential Medal for his work supporting student scholarships. His professional achievements have also been recognized through his inclusion in Marquis Who's Who.

== Personal life ==
Karlins has been with his life partner, Edyth, for almost five decades. They have a daughter, Amber, an award-winning screenwriter and professor, and a granddaughter, Ella.

== Selected publications ==
=== Books ===
- Karlins, Marvin (1969). The Last Man is Out. Prentice-Hall. ISBN 978-0-13-532945-0.
- Andrews, Lewis M.; Karlins, Marvin (1971). Requiem for Democracy?. Holt, Rinehart and Winston. ISBN 978-0-03-078120-9.
- Andrews, Lewis M.; Karlins, Marvin (1975). Psychology: What's in it for Us?. Random House. ISBN 978-0-394-31850-9.
- Karlins, Marvin (1981). The Human Use of Human Resources. McGraw-Hill. ISBN 978-0-07-033298-0.
- Berman, Lyle (2005-11-01). I'm All In: Lyle Berman and the Birth of the World Poker Tour. Cardoza. ISBN 978-1-58042-176-8.
- Karlins, Marvin; John, Stephen (2009). Deal Me in: Twenty of the World's Top Poker Players Share the Heartbreaking and Inspiring Stories of how They Turned Pro. Phil's House Publishing Inc. ISBN 978-0-9824558-0-7.
- Karlins, Marvin (1981-04-12). The Other Way to Better Grades. Random House Publishing Group. ISBN 978-0-449-90046-8.
- Karlins, Marvin (1989). Making the Workplace a Worthplace. Kendall/Hunt. ISBN 978-0-8403-5228-6.
- Karlins, Marvin (2021-06-11). Life Management 2. 0: How to Have the Time of Your Life. Kendall Hunt Publishing Company. ISBN 978-1-7924-7321-0.
