= American Casino & Entertainment Properties =

Casino holding company based in Las Vegas, Nevada

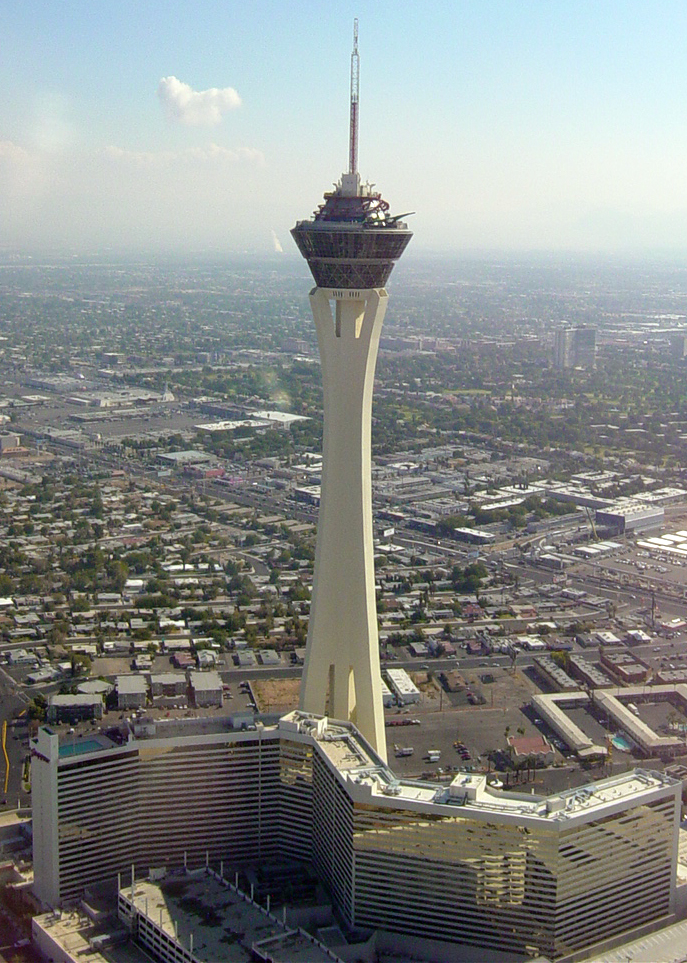
- Stratosphere Las Vegas in 2007
- Company type: Public
- Industry: Gaming
- Founded: December 29, 2003; 22 years ago
- Defunct: October 2, 2017; 8 years ago
- Successor: Golden Entertainment
- Headquarters: Las Vegas, Nevada, United States
- Number of locations: 4
- Area served: Global
- Products: Casinos, Resorts

American Casino & Entertainment Properties (ACEP) owned and operated 4 casinos. It was purchased by Golden Entertainment in October 2017 for $850 million. ACEP was a casino holding company headquartered at the Stratosphere Las Vegas. ACEP was a wholly owned subsidiary of American Real Estate Partners before it was sold to Whitehall Street Real Estate Funds, an investment arm of Goldman Sachs, in February 2008. The company owned the following 4 casinos: Aquarius Casino Resort, Arizona Charlie's Decatur, Arizona Charlie's Boulder and Stratosphere Las Vegas. Golden Entertainment acquired ACEP from Whitehall.

== History ==
Shortly after opening, the Stratosphere Las Vegas on April 30, 1996, the Stratosphere Corporation was forced to file for bankruptcy. After acquiring a majority of the bonds, ACEP gained control of the casino. Carl Icahn acquired the four properties for $300 million.

On November 29, 2005, Harrah's Entertainment announced plans to sell the Flamingo Laughlin casino to ACEP. The sale closed on May 19, 2006, and the Flamingo Laughlin was renamed the Aquarius Casino Resort in October 2006.

On April 23, 2007, it was announced that ACEP was being sold for $1.3 billion to Whitehall Street Real Estate Funds, an investment fund managed by Goldman Sachs. The sale closed on February 21, 2008. Although revenue for 2008 had only slipped by 4.47% from 2007, the interest costs of the acquisition had turned ACEP into a money losing operation. ACEP registered its first positive net income since 2007 of $7.0 million in 2014 and $12.1 million in 2015.

In 2007, Whitehall Street Real Estate Funds, who owned 40% of the Las Vegas Hilton (later, renamed Westgate Las Vegas) and was a passive investor in other casino properties, made an offer of $1.3 billion for the four properties. The appraisal assigned a value of $718 million to the land under the four properties. The buildings were worth $366 million. The land valuation seemed to be almost entirely based on the undeveloped 17 acres (69,000 m^{2}) of land near the Stratosphere.

On February 21, 2008, the ownership of ACEP changed hands from the previous owner, Carl Icahn, to Whitehall Street Real Estate Funds. The new owners retired the $255 million senior notes held by the former owner and replaced them with $1.1 billion in new notes held by Goldman Sachs Term Loans. The interest on these loans far exceeded the net income of the company in 2007. The income of the company had to grow to cover this new financing.

In 2008, ACEP completed $54.0 million in renovations at the Aquarius Casino Resort.

By the 4th quarter of 2008, the company's revenue began plummeting precipitously. The cost of the acquisition was so considerable that the company was operating at a net loss. In March 2009, the company announced that it would begin layoffs.

In May 2009, Whitehall was in discussions to restructure the debt with its lender, Goldman Sachs, due to concerns that the company could default if gaming and visitor numbers continued to decline. Whitehall, which is an affiliate of Goldman, was finalizing terms of an agreement that would see Goldman forgive $593 million of the $1.1 billion debt load. Whitehall would also be released from an additional $200 million in additional debt. In exchange for the debt relief, a mortgage unit of Goldman would gain a 22 percent interest in the company.

In 2009, net revenue fell to $356 million, its lowest since 2005. The company restructured its debt in the last quarter and laid off 600 employees.

In 2011, ACEP completed $20 million in renovations at the Stratosphere, updating its rooms and casino floor and promoted the changes within new marketing campaign. The Stratosphere also added a lounge called Sky Lounge 107 the 108th floor. In addition to the renovations, Stratosphere added a new thrill ride, the Sky Jump.

By 2015, net revenues had increased to $373 million.

In June 2017, Whitehall agreed to sell ACEP to Golden Entertainment for $850 million.

On October 2, 2017, Golden Entertainment closed on its $850 million purchase of the four casinos owned by ACEP.

== Properties ==
- Stratosphere Las Vegas — Las Vegas
- Arizona Charlie's Boulder — Las Vegas
- Arizona Charlie's Decatur — Las Vegas
- Aquarius Casino Resort — Laughlin, Nevada
