= BJ Energy Solutions =

American energy company

- Company type: Private
- Industry: Oilfield services
- Founded: 1872
- Website: Official website

BJ Energy Solutions (known as "BJ") was an American oilfield services company. It founded in 1872 as the Byron Jackson Company in Woodland, California, by inventor Byron Jackson.

== History ==
BJ Services Company was a leading worldwide provider of pressure pumping and oilfield services for the petroleum industry. Pressure pumping services consist of cementing and stimulation services used in the completion of new oil and natural gas wells and in remedial work on existing wells, both onshore and offshore. Oilfield services include completion tools, completion fluids, casing and tubular services, production chemical services, and precommissioning, maintenance and turnaround services in the pipeline and process business, including pipeline inspection.

At one point, known as BJ Services Company, the company operated in more than 50 countries worldwide. BJ Services generated record revenue of $5.4 billion in fiscal 2008, up 13% from the prior year, and had 18,000 employees.

On April 28, 2010, the company was bought by Baker Hughes in a $5.5 billion stock and cash deal. Greenhill & Co. advised on the transaction.

In December 2016, it was announced that Baker Hughes would be dividing off its North America Land Pressure Pumping division to form a new independent BJ Services Company. BJ Services is positioned with a strategic footprint to serve clients in all targeted North American basins. The new company will include ALLIED Services and ALTCEM. In addition to Baker Hughes, owners include Goldman Sachs and the private equity firm CSL Capital Management.

BJ Services in 2017 began operating as an independent joint venture after Baker Hughes sold a 53.3 percent stake in the hydraulic fracturing and cementing business to private equity firm CSL Capital Management and Goldman Sachs’ West Street Energy Partners for $325 million.

On 20 July 2020, BJ Services filed Chapter 11 bankruptcy.

In September 2020, a group of private investors purchased the BJ brand along with a portion of the fracturing assets to create BJ Energy Solutions, LLC. The company operates in North American basins and utilizes Next-Generation Fracturing technology.

== See also ==
- List of oilfield service companies
