= Aquarius Casino Resort =

Hotel and casino in Nevada, United States

Coordinates: 35.1635141°N 114.5725188°W

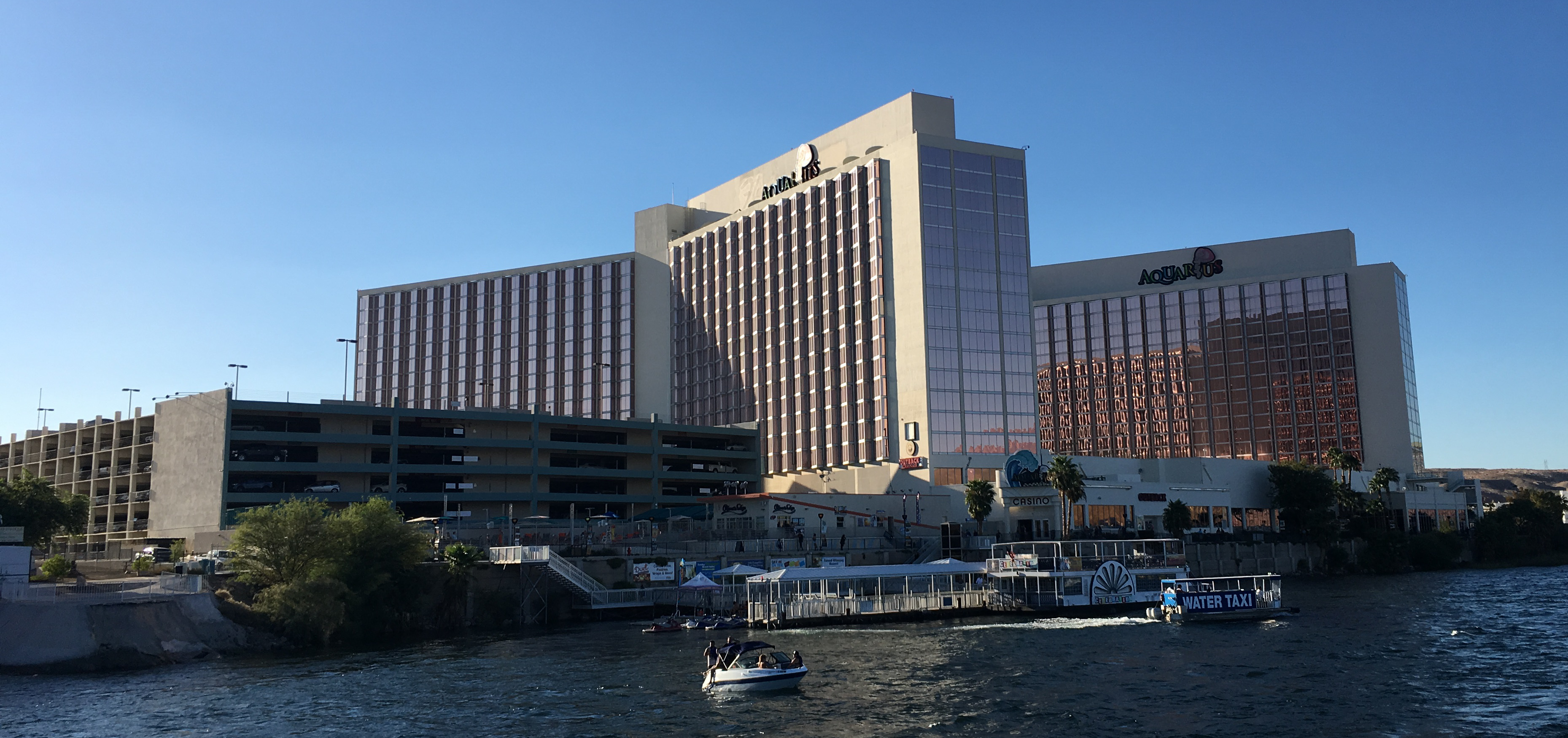
- The property as seen from the Colorado River in 2018
- Interactive map of Aquarius Casino Resort
- Location: Laughlin, Nevada, U.S.; 1900 South Casino Drive
- Opened: August 1, 1990; 35 years ago
- Theme: Ocean
- No. of rooms: 1,907
- Gaming space: 57,070 sq ft (5,302 m^{2})
- Owner: Vici Properties
- Operating license holder: Golden Entertainment
- Previous names: Flamingo Hilton Laughlin (1990–2000); Flamingo Laughlin (2000–2006)
- Renovated in: 2000, 2008, 2010
- Website: aquariuscasinoresort.com

The Aquarius Casino Resort (formerly Flamingo Hilton Laughlin and Flamingo Laughlin) is a hotel and casino located on the banks of the Colorado River in Laughlin, Nevada. It is owned by Vici Properties and operated by Golden Entertainment and is the largest hotel in Laughlin.

== Facilities ==
The Aquarius has two 18-floor towers with 1,907 rooms and suites that overlook the Colorado River. The casino, with an area of 57,070 square feet (5,302 m^{2}), has 1,240 slot machines, 33 table games, and a race and sports book. The property includes a business center, fitness center, pool and tennis courts. The Aquarius also has a tour boat, the Celebration, which takes visitors on a tour of the Colorado River area of Laughlin.

== History ==
=== Flamingo Hilton Laughlin (1990–2000) ===
Flamingo Laughlin logo (1990–2006)

The property was originally built by Hilton Hotels, which operated it as the Flamingo Hilton Laughlin. It was a sister property to the Flamingo Hilton Las Vegas and Flamingo Hilton Reno. The Laughlin property was topped out in January 1990. It opened on August 1, 1990, becoming the biggest hotel in Laughlin. It was also Hilton's largest hotel to be built from scratch. The project cost $190 million.

=== Flamingo Laughlin (2000–2006) ===
In October 2000, the hotel's name was changed to the Flamingo Laughlin.

On November 29, 2005, Harrah's Entertainment announced plans to sell the resort to American Casino & Entertainment Properties (ACEP). The $170-million sale closed on May 19, 2006. ACEP was allowed to continue using the Flamingo name for up to six months after the sale.

=== Aquarius Casino Resort (2006–present) ===
The Flamingo Laughlin became the Aquarius Casino Resort on November 24, 2006.

In 2008, ACEP completed $54 million in renovations at the Aquarius.

In October 2017, Golden Entertainment purchased ACEP, adding the Aquarius and three other casinos to its portfolio.

In 2026, Vici Properties acquired the real estate of the Aquarius and leased it back to Golden Entertainment, as part of Golden's going-private transaction.

== Entertainment ==
The Aquarius features entertainment appearing regularly in Splash Cabaret for free, and occasional stage shows and musical reviews in the Aquarius Pavilion.
