= List of casinos =

This is a worldwide list of notable, physical casinos.

== Australia ==
=== Australian Capital Territory ===
- Casino Canberra (Canberra)

=== New South Wales ===
- The Star, Sydney (Sydney)
- Crown Sydney (Sydney)

=== Northern Territory ===
- Lasseters Hotel Casino (Alice Springs)
- Mindil Beach Casino (Formerly Skycity Casino) (Darwin)

=== Queensland ===
- The Star Gold Coast (formerly Jupiters Hotel and Casino) (Gold Coast)
- The Reef Hotel Casino (Cairns)
- The Ville Resort-Casino (Townsville)
- The Star Brisbane (Brisbane, Queensland)

=== South Australia ===
- Adelaide Casino (formerly Skycity Adelaide) (Adelaide)

=== Tasmania ===
- Country Club Casino (Launceston)
- Wrest Point Hotel Casino (Hobart)

=== Victoria ===
- Crown Melbourne (Melbourne)

=== Western Australia ===
- Crown Perth (formerly Burswood Casino) (Perth)

== Bahamas ==
- Atlantis Paradise Island (Paradise Island)
- Baha Mar (Nassau)

== Belgium ==
- Knokke Casino (Knokke)

== Cambodia ==
- Lucky Ruby Border Casino (Svay Rieng Province)
- NagaWorld (Phnom Penh)

== Canada ==
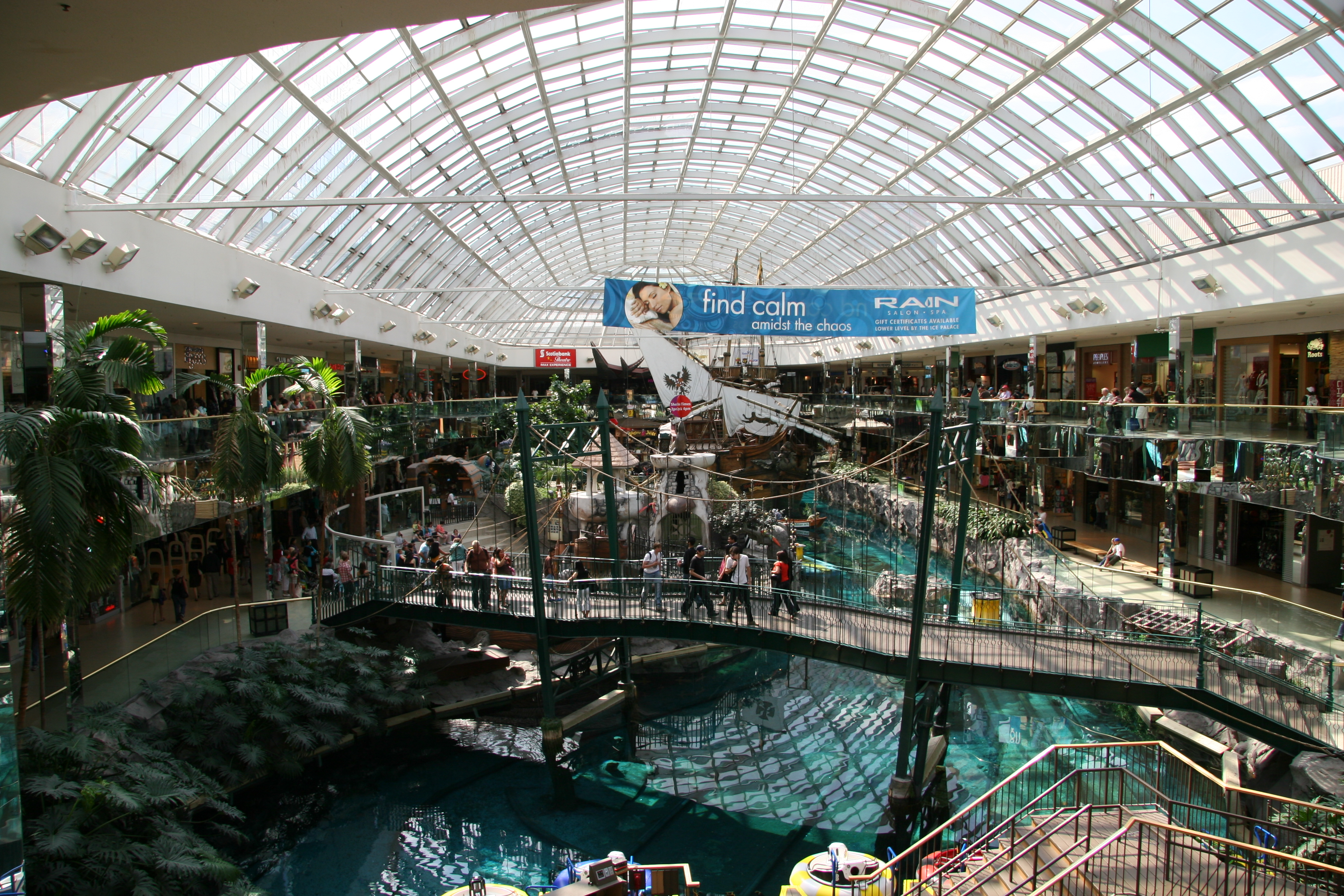
Palace Casino

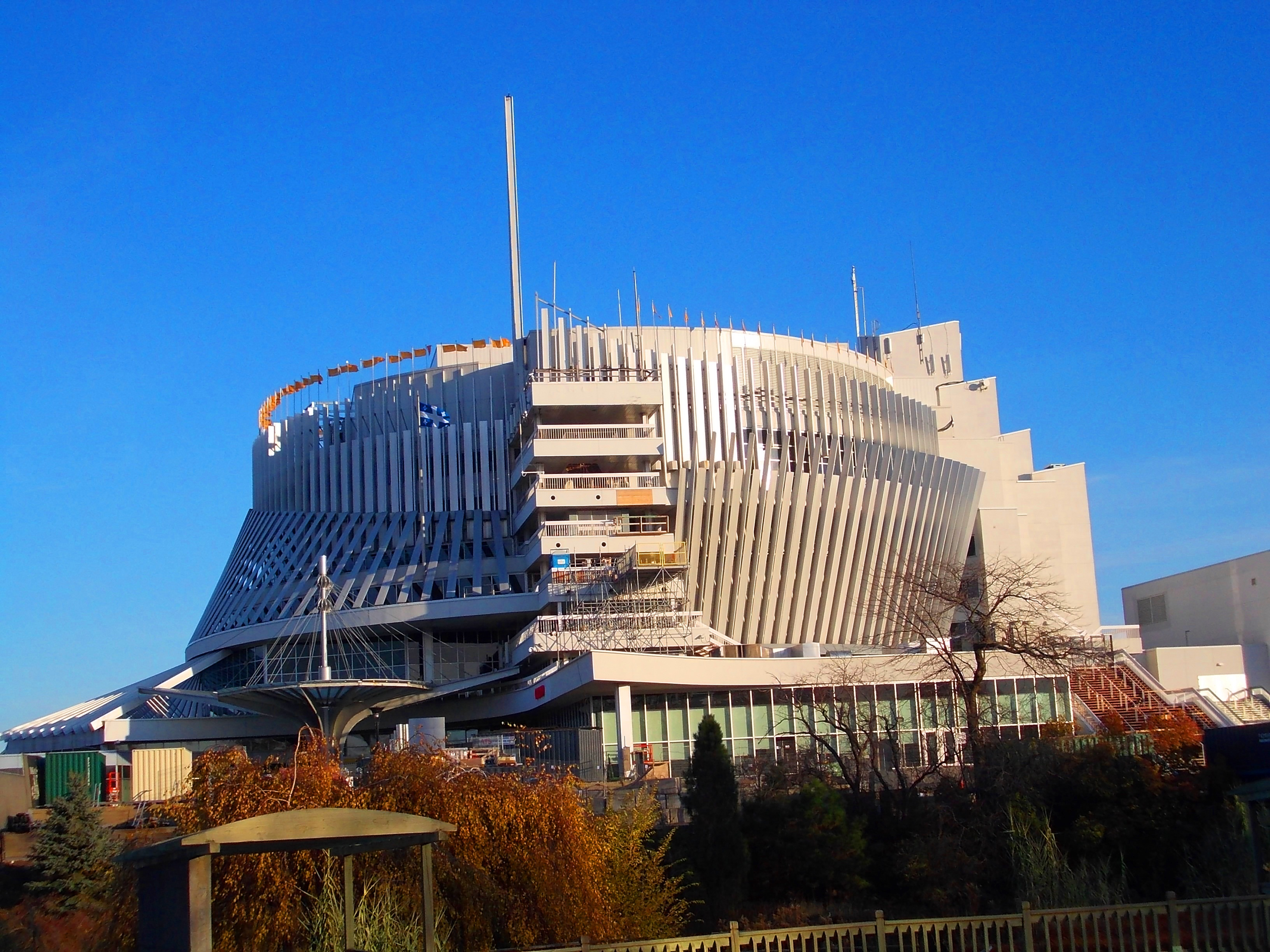
Casino de Montréal

=== British Columbia ===
- Gateway Casinos
- Hard Rock Casino Vancouver (Coquitlam)
- River Rock Casino Resort (Richmond)

=== Manitoba ===
- Aseneskak Casino (Opaskwayak Cree Nation)
- Club Regent Casino (Winnipeg)
- McPhillips Station Casino (Winnipeg)
- South Beach Casino (Scanterbury)
- Assiniboia Downs (St. James-Assiniboia)

=== Nova Scotia ===
- Casino Nova Scotia (Halifax and Sydney)

=== Ontario ===
Commercial

- Caesars Windsor (Windsor)
- Casino Niagara (Niagara Falls)
- Casino Rama (Rama)
- Niagara Fallsview Casino Resort (Niagara Falls)
- Woodbine Racetrack Casino (Toronto)

Charity

- CNE Casino (Toronto)
- Great Blue Heron Casino (Port Perry)
- Elements Casino Brantford
- OLG Casino Sault Ste. Marie
- OLG Casino Thousand Islands (Gananoque)

=== Quebec ===
- Casino de Charlevoix (La Malbaie)
- Casino du Lac-Leamy (Gatineau)
- Montreal Casino (Montreal)

=== Saskatchewan ===
- Casino Regina

== China ==
=== Macau ===
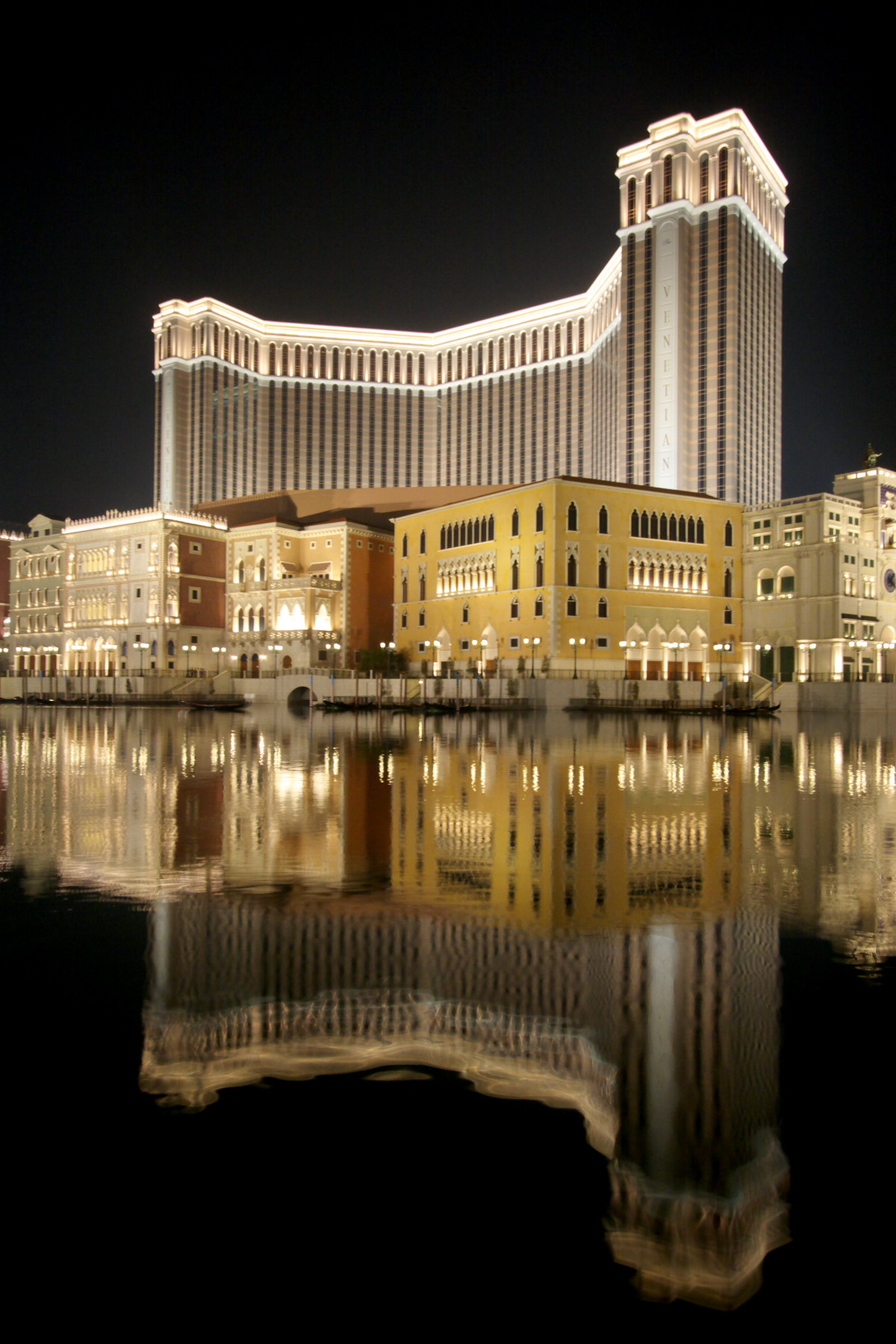
The Venetian Macao is the largest casino in the world

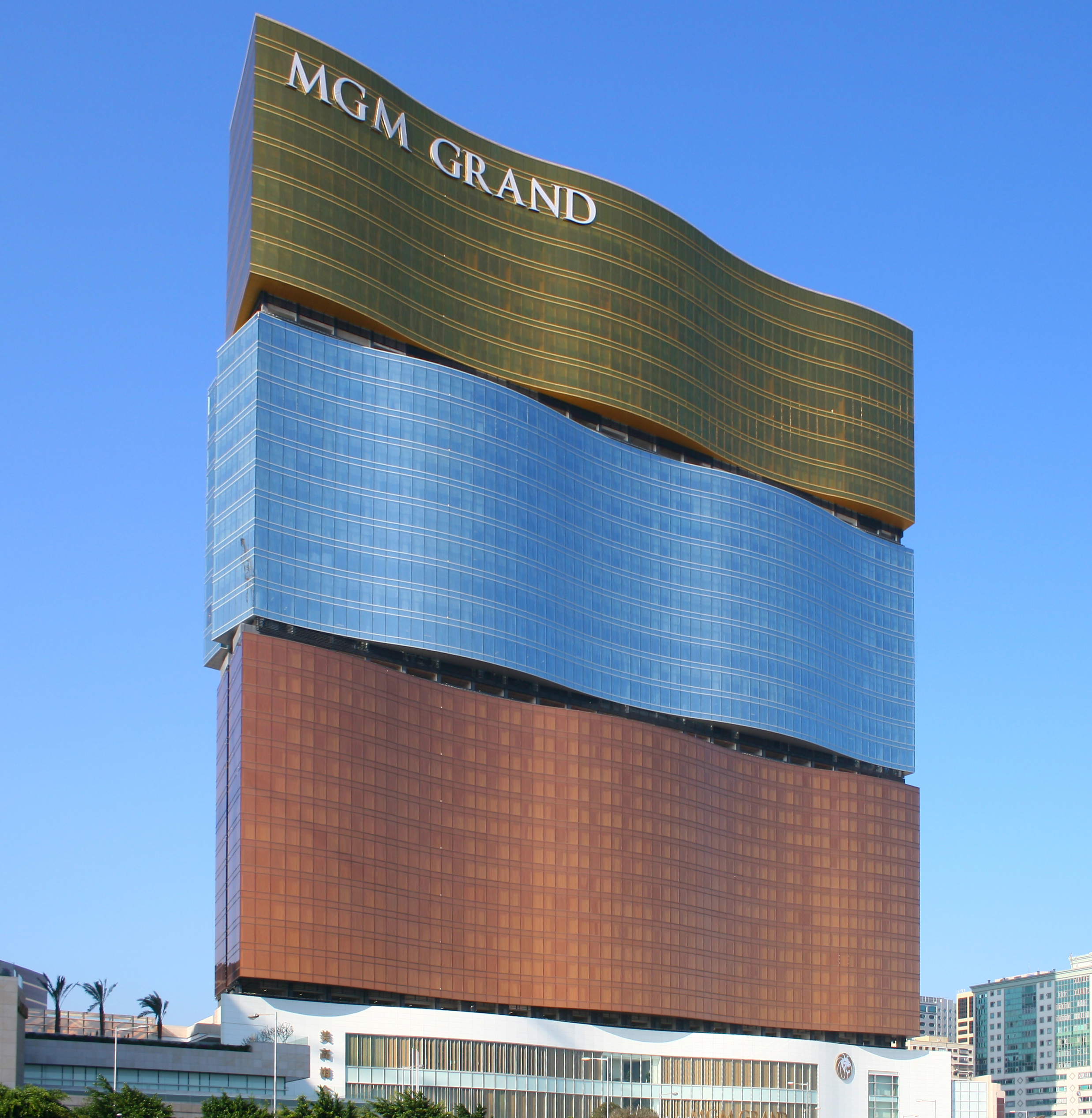
MGM Macau

==== Cotai Strip ====
- City of Dreams
- Galaxy Macau
- MGM Cotai
- Studio City
- The Londoner Macao
- The Parisian Macao
- The Venetian Macao
- Wynn Palace

==== Macau Peninsula ====
- Casino Lisboa
- Grand Lisboa
- L'Arc Casino
- MGM Grand Macau
- Ponte 16
- Sands Macao
- StarWorld Hotel
- Wynn Macau

==== Taipa Island ====
- Altira Macau

== Finland ==
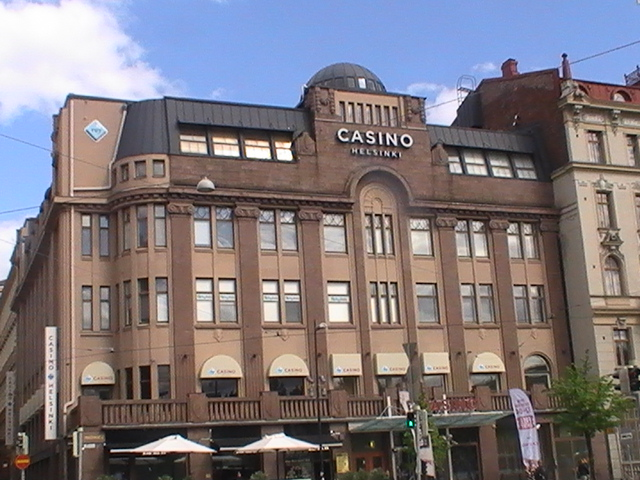
Casino Helsinki in Helsinki, Finland

- Casino Helsinki

== Germany ==
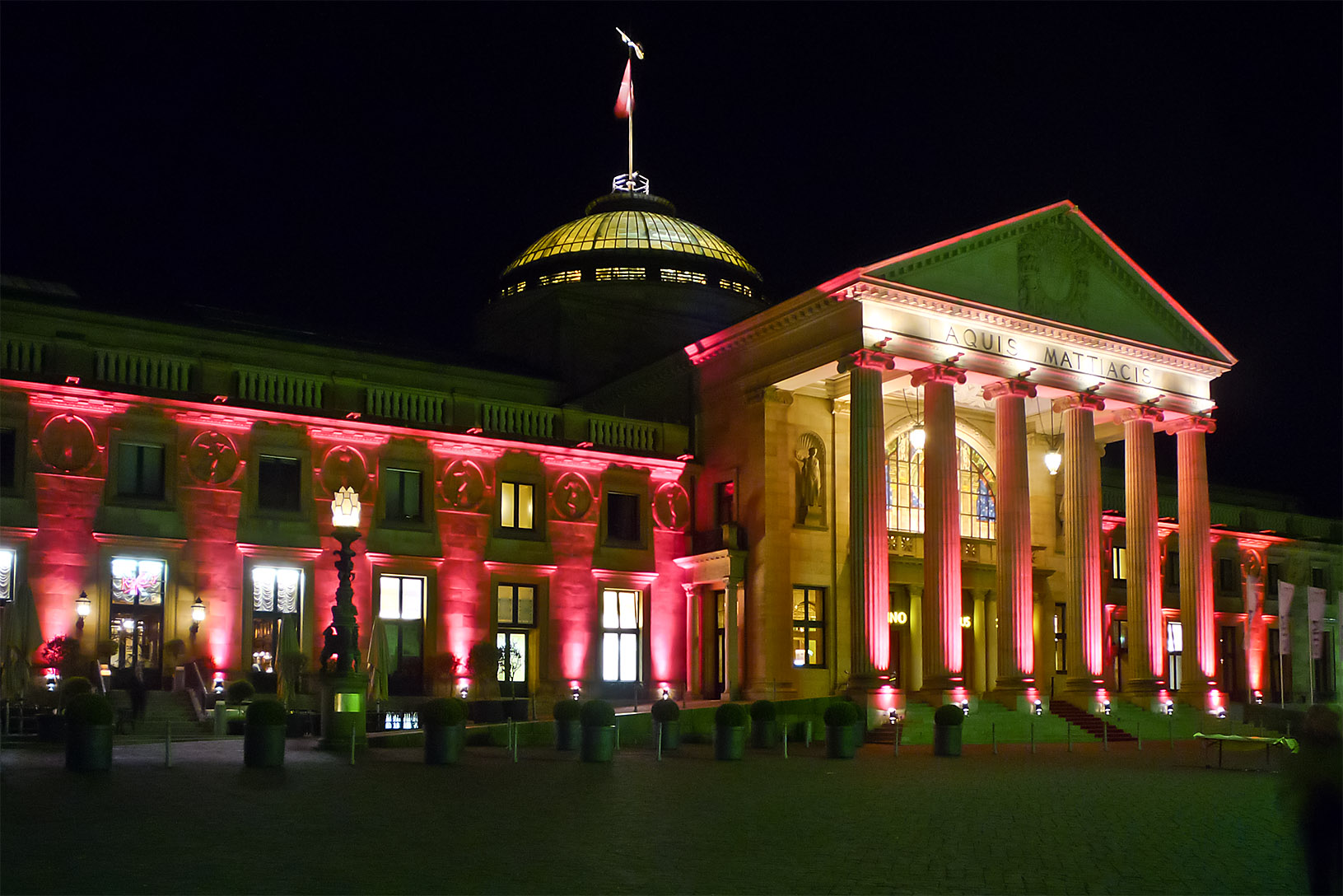
Casino Wiesbaden near Frankfurt, Germany

- Bad Homburg Casino
- Bad Oeynhausen Casino
- Bad Steben Casino
- Baden-Baden Casino
- Berlin Casino Potsdamer Platz
- Bremen Casino
- Dortmund Casino Hohensyburg
- Duisburg Casino
- Hamburg Casino Esplanade
- Wiesbaden Casino

== Greece ==
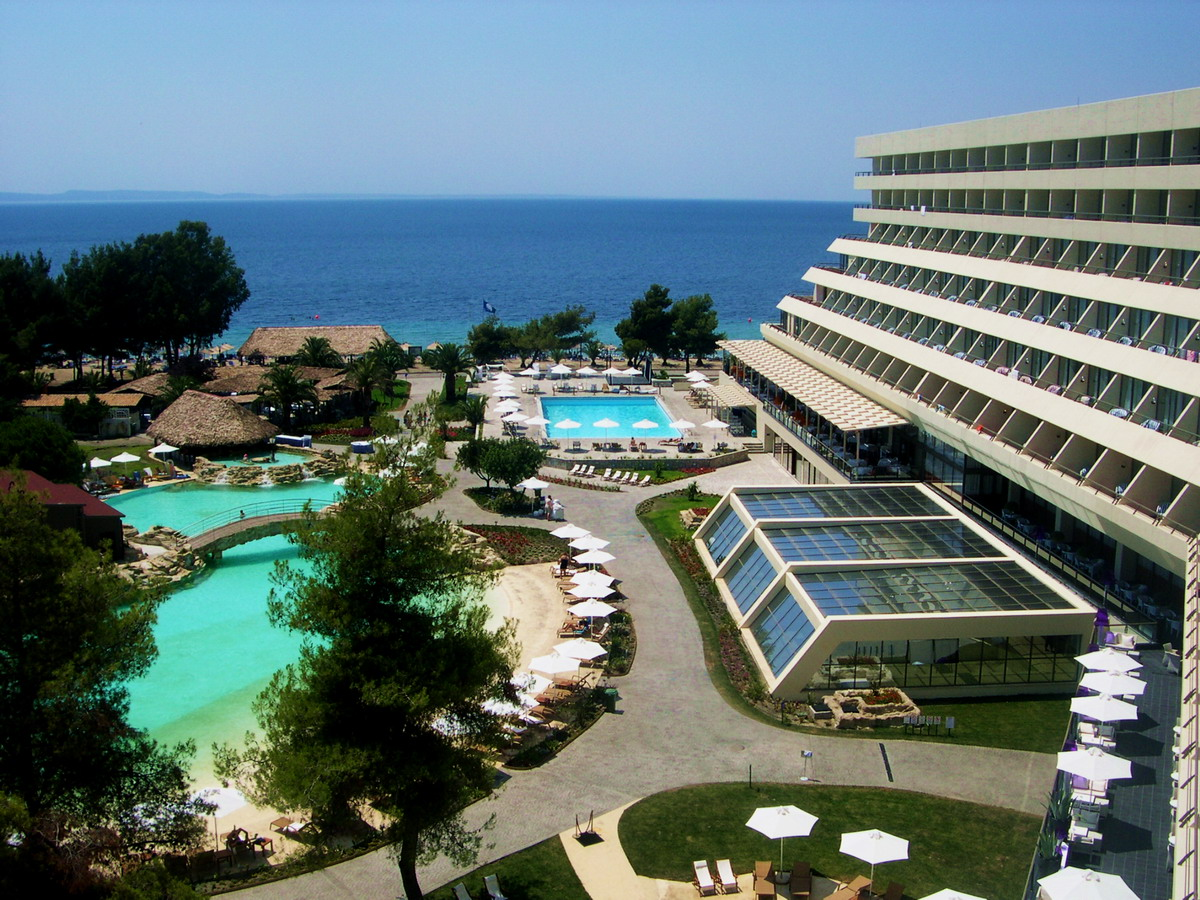
Porto Carras Grand Resort

- Porto Carras Grand Resort (Chalkidiki)

== Italy ==
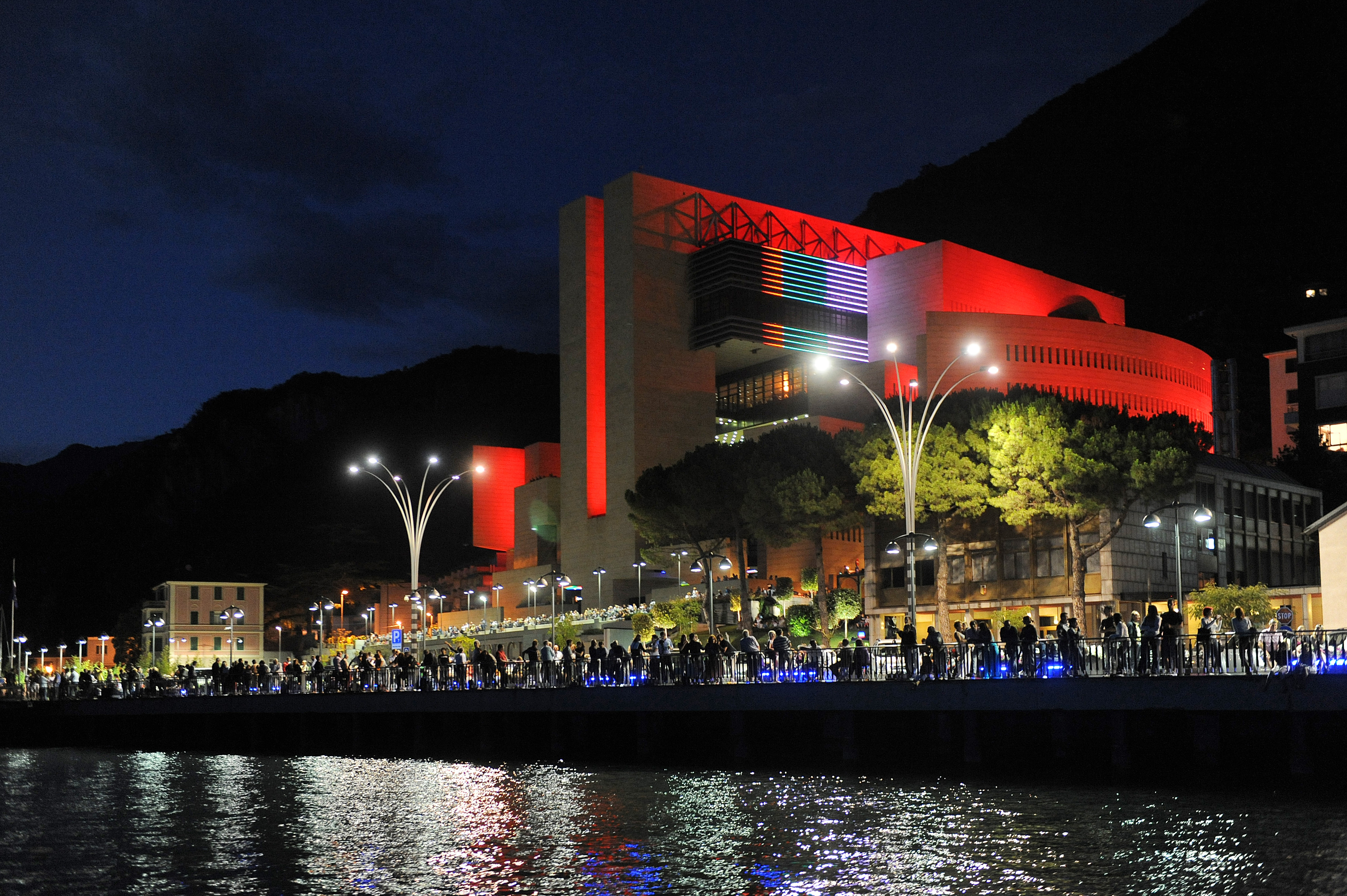
Casinò di Campione

- Casinò di Campione (Campione d'Italia)
- Casinò di Sanremo (Sanremo)
- Casino de la Vallée (Saint-Vincent)
- Casinò di Venezia (Venice)

== Kazakhstan ==
- Casino Zodiak (Qonayev)

== Lebanon ==
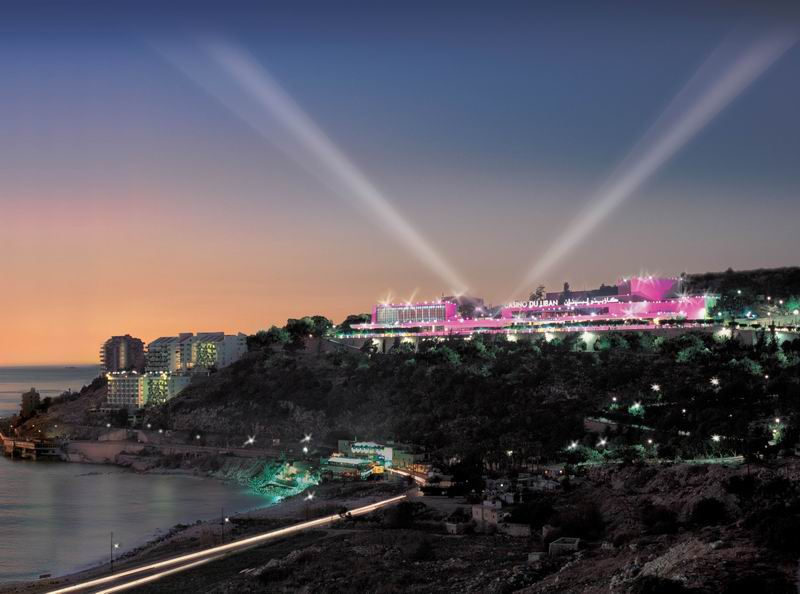
Casino du Liban

- Casino du Liban (Jounieh)

== Malaysia ==
- Haanifiyah Casinos

== Malta ==
- Dragonara Casino (St. Julian's)

== Monaco ==
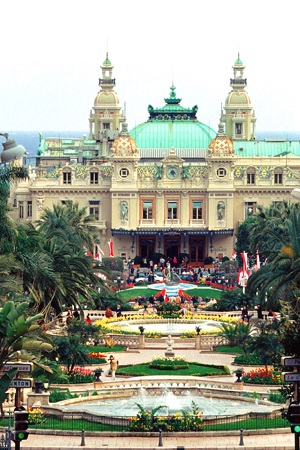
Monte Carlo Casino

- Monte Carlo Casino (Monte Carlo)

== Nepal ==
- Maharaja The Royal Casino, Kathmandu
- Casino Royale
- Casino Everest
- Casino Mahjong, Kathmandu
- The Millionier‘s Club, Kathmandu
- Casino Pride, Boudha
- Bally‘S Nepal Casino Thamel
- Deltin Casino
- CMG Club, Kathmandu, Mahendranagr, Birjung, Biratnagar
- Tiger Palace Casino

== The Netherlands ==
- Holland Casino

== New Zealand ==
- Christchurch Casino
- Grand Casino (Dunedin Casino)
- SkyCity Auckland
- Skycity Hamilton
- Skycity Queenstown

== Philippines ==
- Golden Nile Bar & Casino in Angeles City
- Wild Orchid Resort & Poker Room in Angeles City
- Casino Filipino Angeles in Angeles City
- Casino Filipino Olongapo in Olongapo
- Subic Venecia Casino in Subic Bay Freeport Zone
- Oriental Paradise Casino in Subic Bay Freeport Zone
- Royce Hotel and Casino in Clark, Pampanga
- Casino Filipino San Pedro in San Pedro, Laguna
- Casino Filipino Tagaytay in Tagaytay
- Casino Filipino Cavite in Bacoor
- Casino Filipino Bacolod in Bacolod
- Arcade-Amigo Hotel in Iloilo City
- Waterfront Cebu City Hotel & Casino in Cebu City
- City of Dreams Manila
- Okada Manila
- Manila Grand Opera House Hotel and Casino in Manila
- Solaire Resort & Casino

== Portugal ==
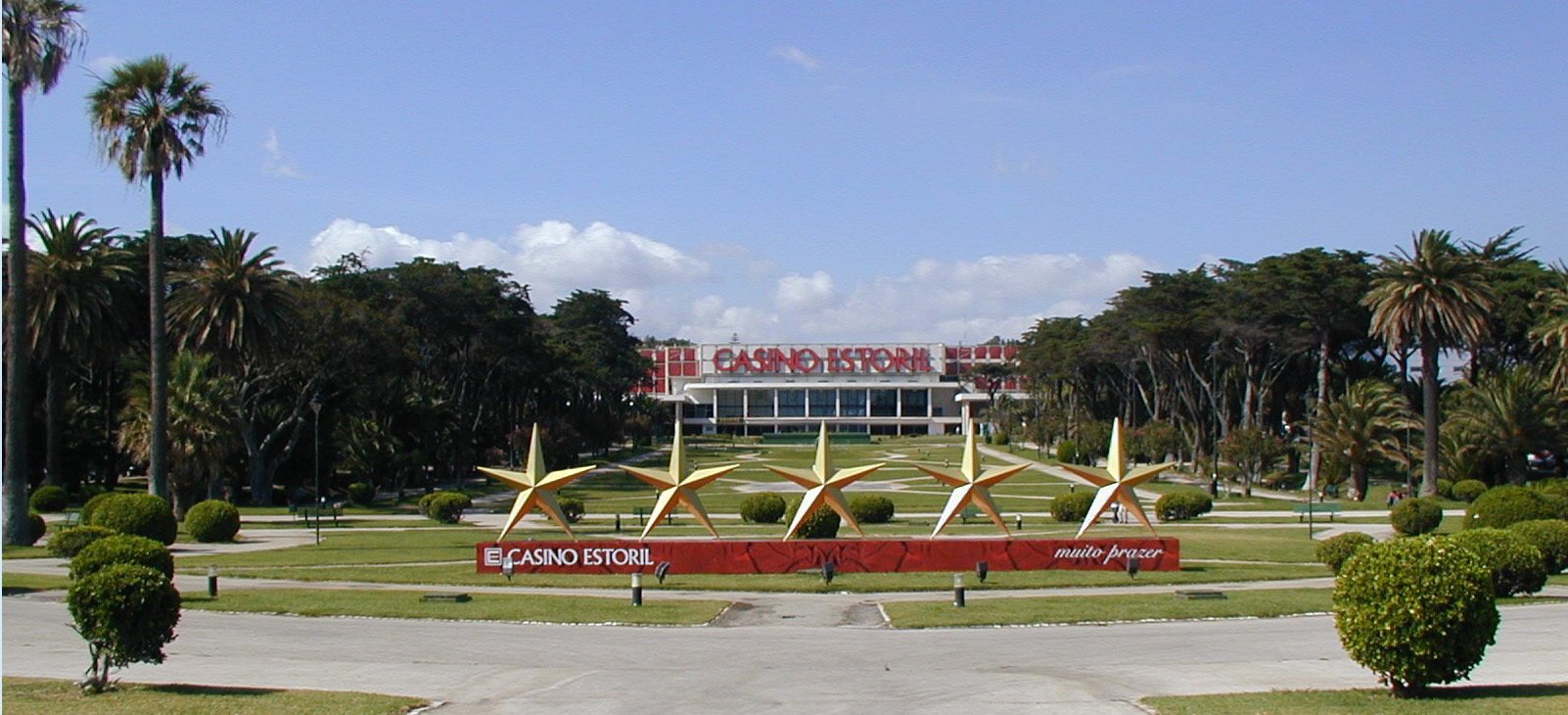
Estoril Casino

- Casino da Madeira (Madeira)
- Casino da Póvoa (Póvoa de Varzim)
- Casino Estoril (Cascais)
- Casino Lisboa (Lisbon)

== Romania ==
- Constanța Casino
- Sinaia Casino
- Vatra Dornei Casino

== Slovenia ==
- Grand Casino Portorož
- Perla Casino & Hotel

== Singapore ==
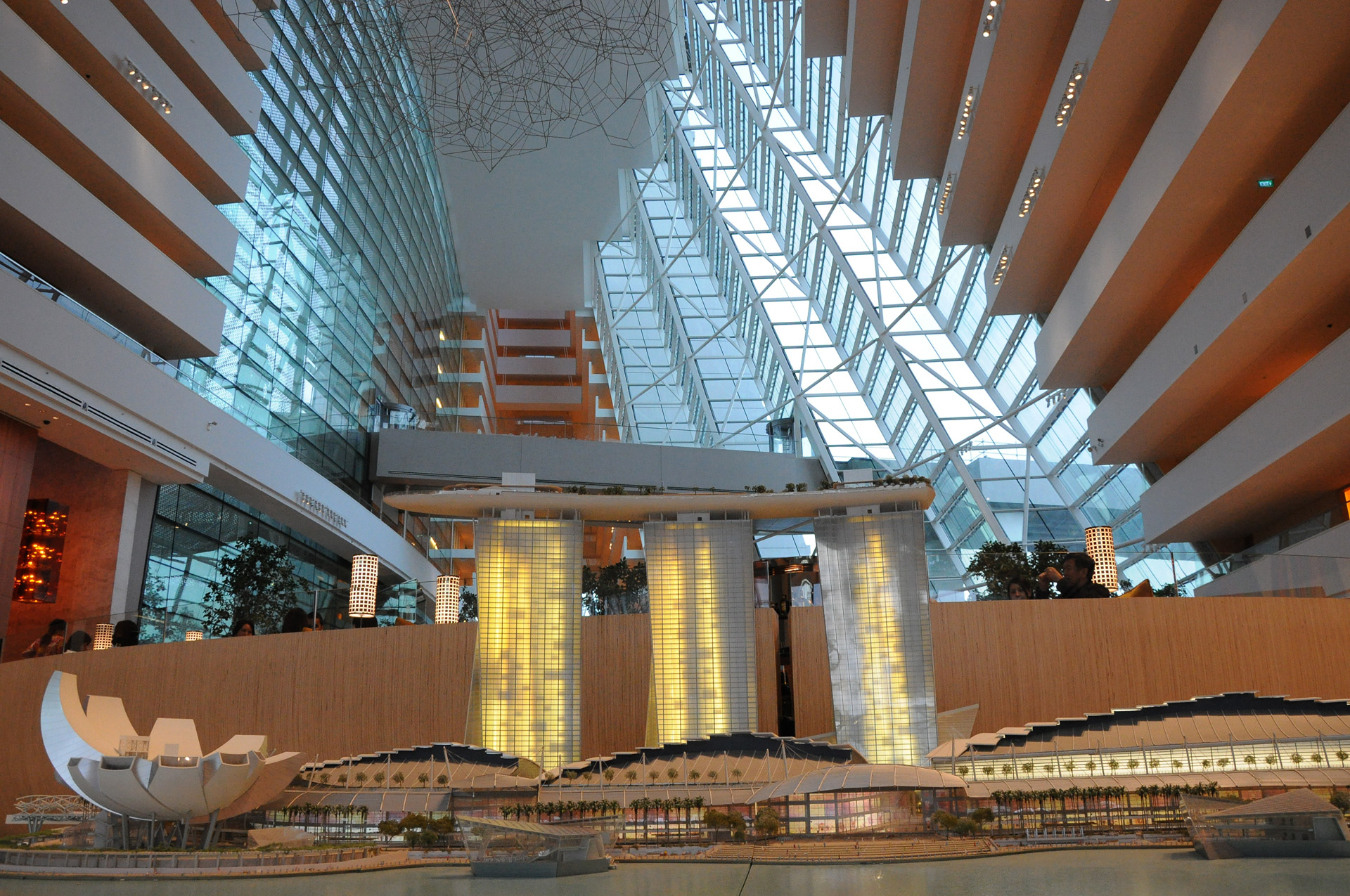
Marina Bay Sands

- Marina Bay Sands
- Resorts World Sentosa

== South Africa ==
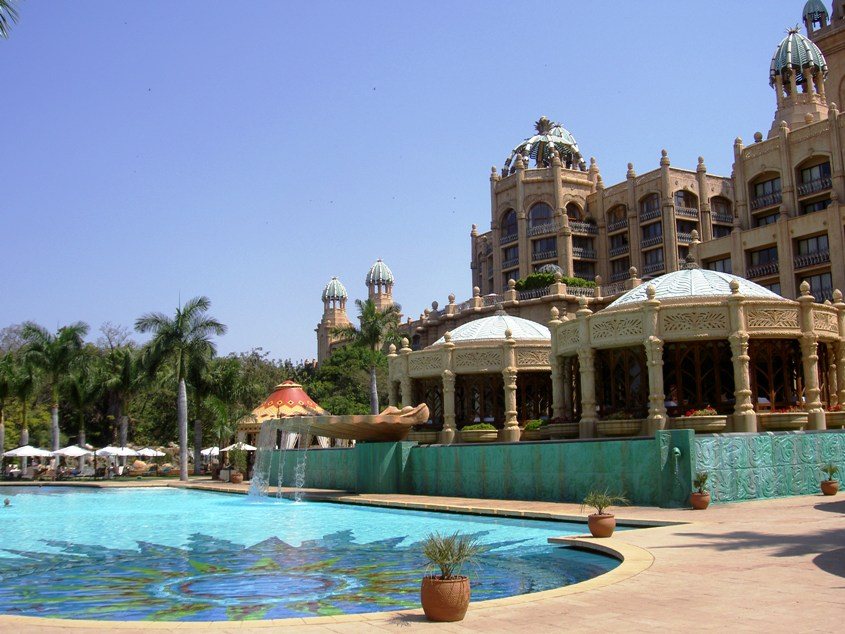
Sun City Resort

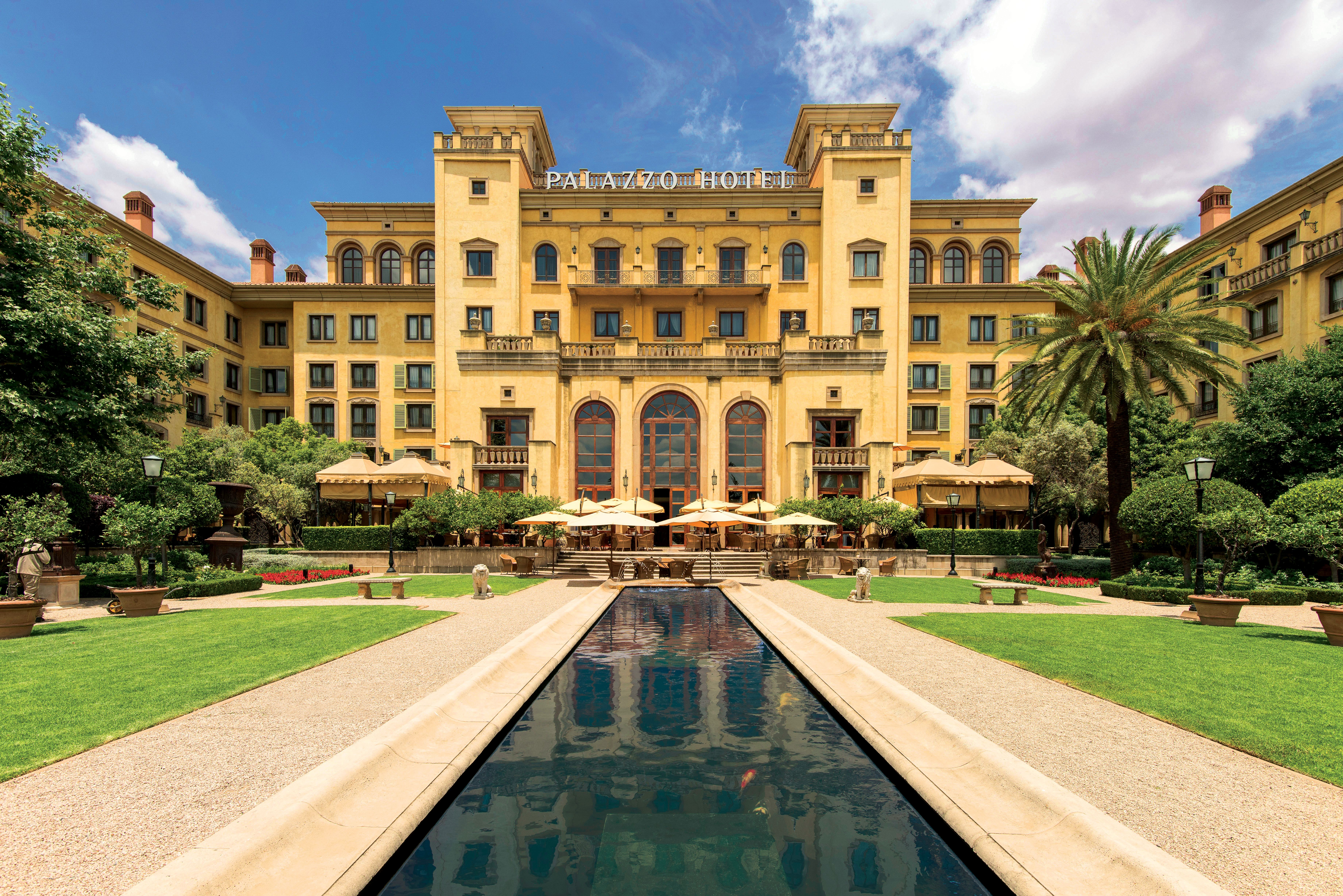
Palazzo Hotel Montecasino, Fourways Johannesburg

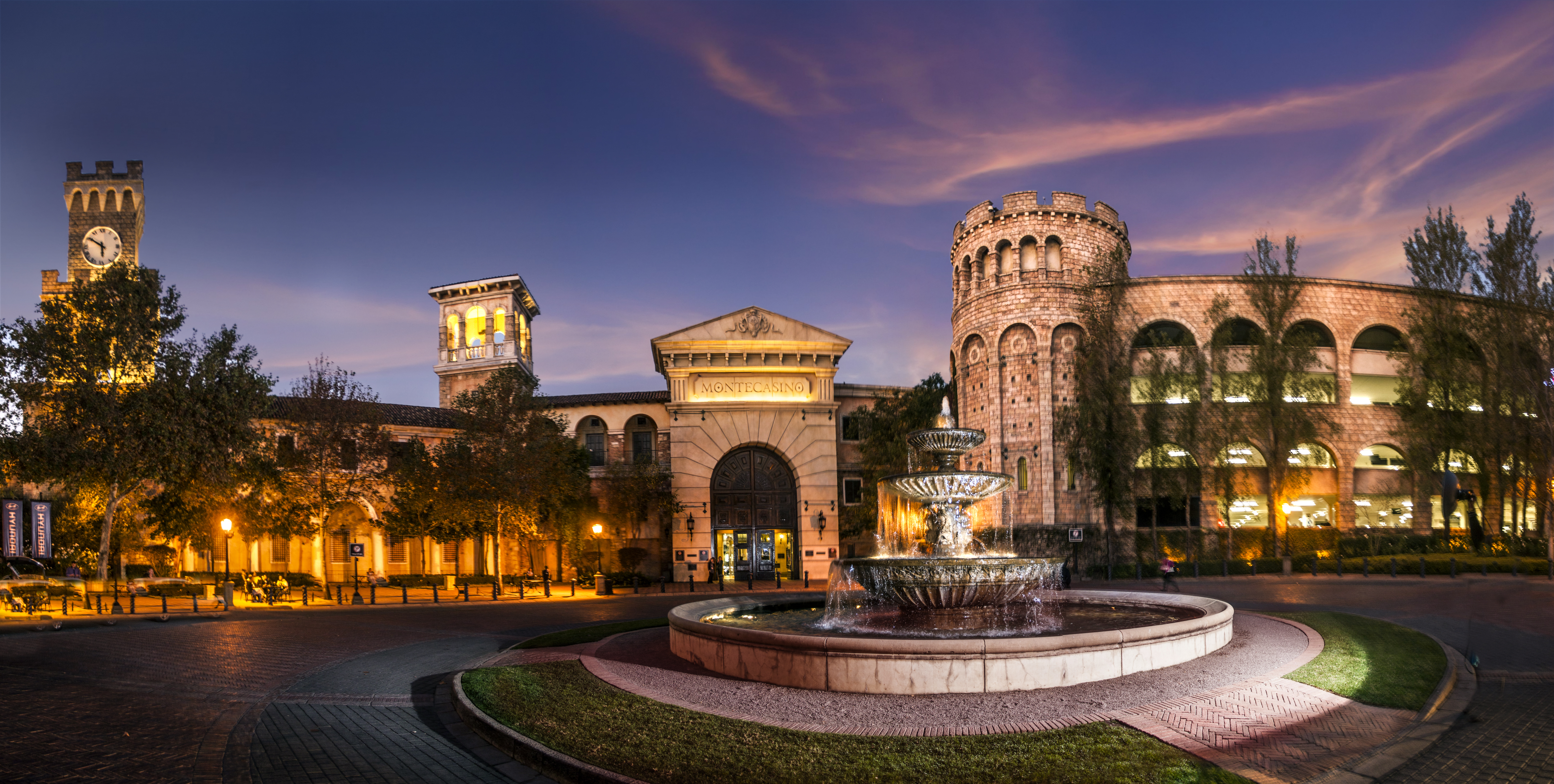
Montecasino, Fourways Johannesburg

- Montecasino
- Rio Hotel Casino and Convention Resort
- Sibaya Casino
- Sun City Resort
- Suncoast Casino, Hotels & Entertainment

== South Korea ==
- Kangwon Land Casino (Jeongseon)

== Spain ==
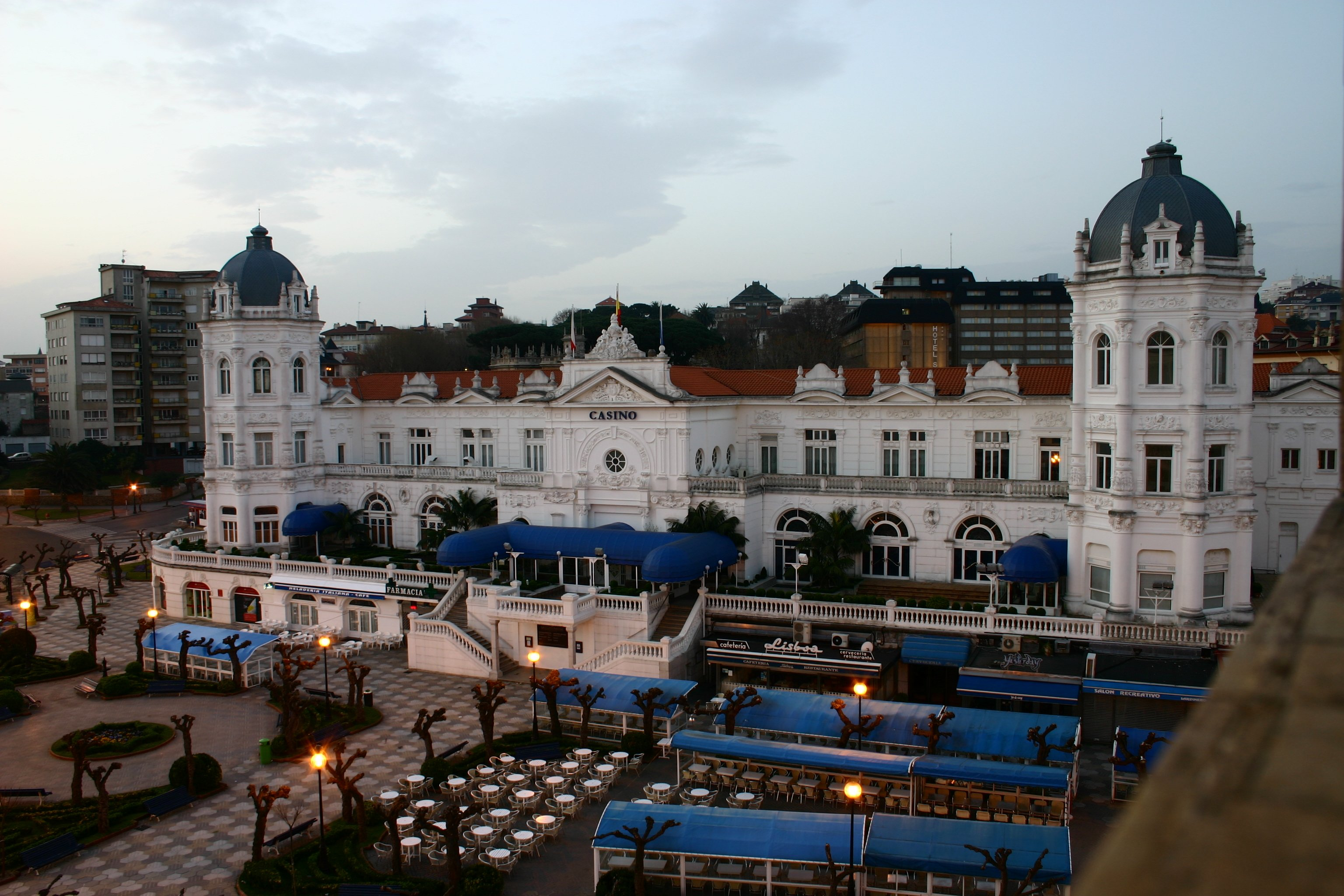
Gran Casino del Sardinero

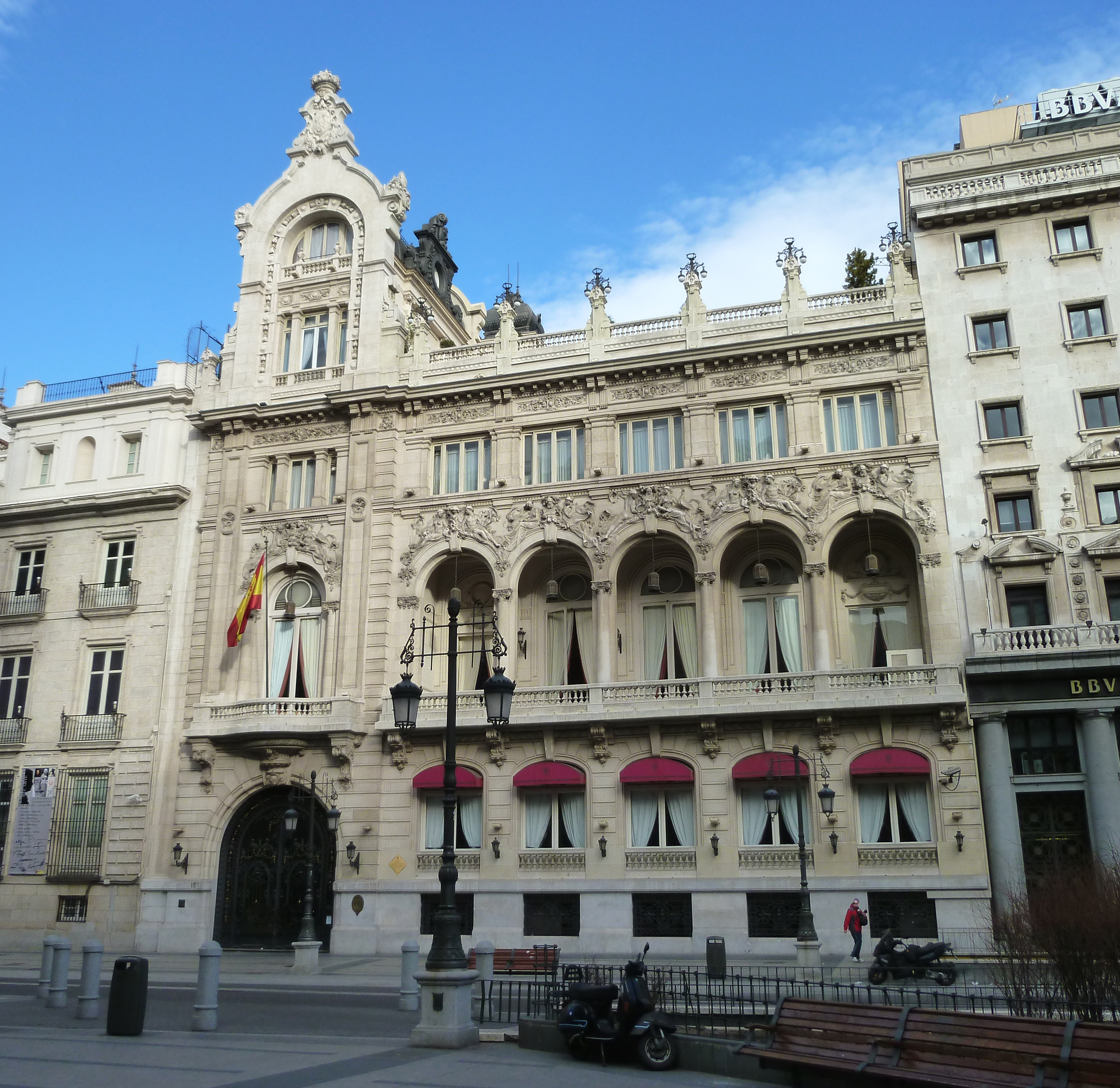
Casino de Madrid

=== Cantabria ===
- Gran Casino del Sardinero (Santander)

=== Community of Madrid ===
- Casino de Madrid

=== Catalonia ===
- Peralada Castle

== Sweden ==
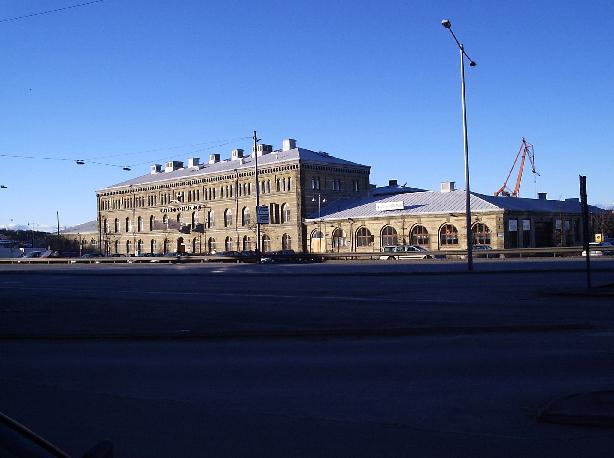
Casino Cosmopol

== Switzerland ==
- Casinò Lugano
- Montreux Casino

== United Kingdom ==
- Gala Casinos
- Grosvenor Casinos
- Maxims Casino (Westcliff-on-Sea)
- Opera House Casino (Scarborough)
- Resorts World Birmingham

=== London ===
- Aspinall's
- Crockfords
- Grosvenor Casinos
- Maxims Casino
- The Hippodrome

== United States ==
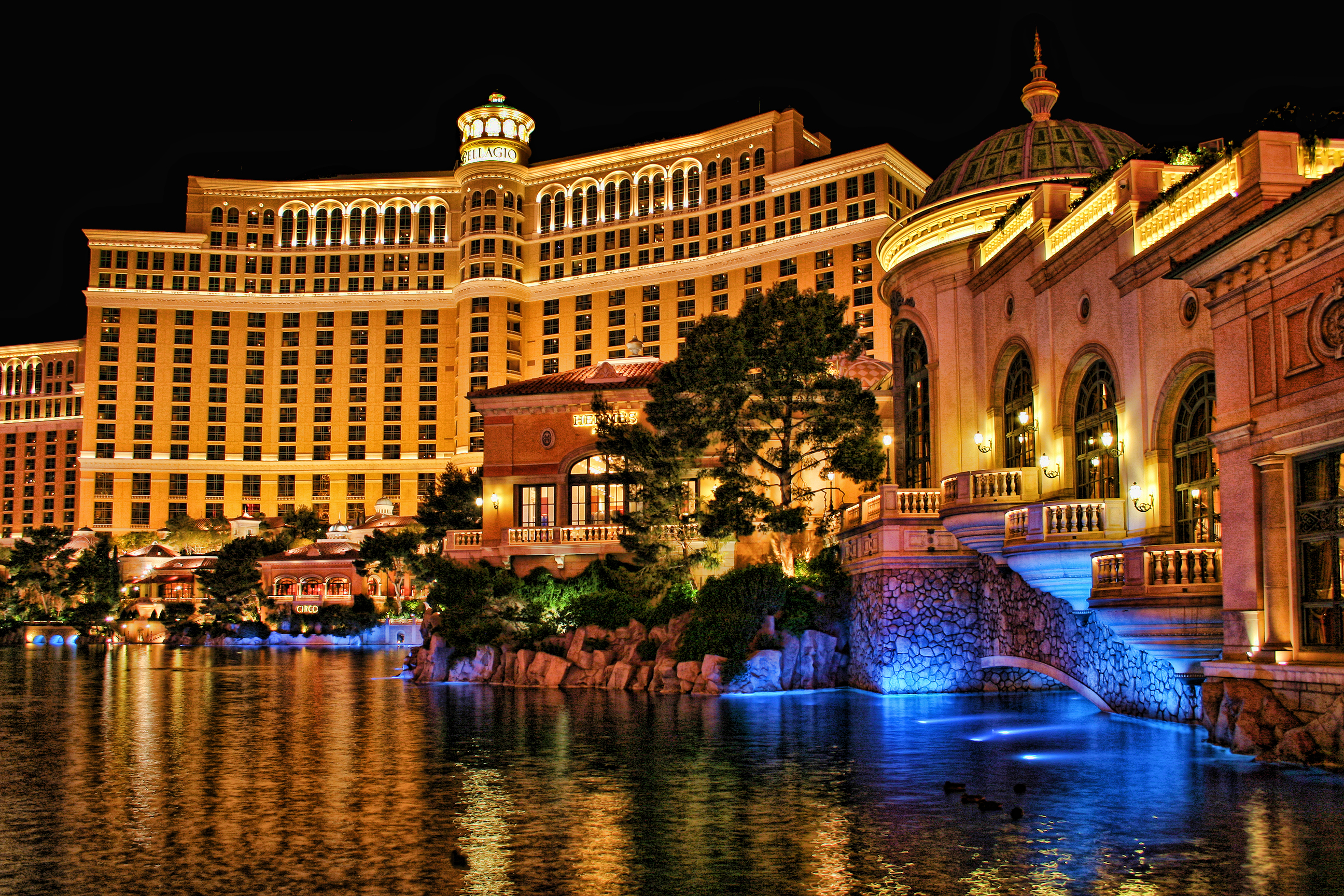
Bellagio Casino and Hotel

== See also ==
- List of casino hotels
- List of integrated resorts
- List of defunct gambling companies
- Lists of tourist attractions
