= List of defunct gambling companies =

This is a list of defunct gambling companies.

== Defunct gambling companies ==
- Argent Corporation – company in Las Vegas, Nevada that at one time controlled the Hacienda Hotel/Casino, the Stardust Resort & Casino, the Fremont Hotel and Casino and the Marina Hotel and Casino
- Aztar
- BetBright
- Boomtown, Inc.
- Caesars World – grew to eight casinos and resorts over the years, until going through a series of ownership changes beginning in 1995, and was ultimately absorbed by Park Place Entertainment in 1999
- Casino Magic Corp.
- Chartwell Leisure
- Fairground Gaming
- Fitzgeralds Gaming
- Gambit
- Gold Strike Resorts
- Grand Casinos
- The Greenspun Corporation
- Hollywood Casino Corp.
- International Game Technology
- Lady Luck Gaming
- Lakes Entertainment
- Leisure and Gaming
- Mandalay Resort Group – in terms of market capitalization, was one of the largest casino operators in the world. Mandalay Resort Group was a hotel-casino operator based in Paradise, Nevada. Its major properties included Mandalay Bay, Luxor, Excalibur and Circus Circus, as well as half of the Monte Carlo
- MGM Growth Properties
- Mirage Resorts
- MTR Gaming Group
- Park Place Entertainment – Las Vegas Valley, Nevada based business that was the largest owner, operator and developer of casinos throughout the world
- Peninsula Gaming
- Resorts International
- SHFL Entertainment
- Sodak Gaming
- SunCruz Casinos – was one of many cruise lines that offered "cruises to nowhere," legally transporting passengers into international waters beyond the reach of federal and state gambling laws
- Trump Hotels & Casino Resorts
- WBX
- World Sports Exchange

=== Defunct poker companies ===
- Absolute Poker
- Artworx
- Boss Media
- Cake Network
- CardRunners
- Cereus Poker Network
- CryptoLogic
- Doyles Room
- Full Flush Poker
- Gutshot Poker Club
- Hero Poker
- Ivey League
- Mayfair Club
- PKR.com
- Planet Poker
- Pokerspot
- Pokertek
- UltimateBet
- UltimatePoker.com

== See also ==
- List of casinos
- List of casino hotels
- Lists of companies
