= Caesars Entertainment (disambiguation) =

Caesars Entertainment, formerly Eldorado Resorts, is an American hotel and casino entertainment company

Caesars Entertainment has also been the name of several other casino companies:

- Harrah's Entertainment, named Caesars Entertainment Corporation from 2010 to 2020
- Park Place Entertainment, named Caesars Entertainment, Inc., from 2003 to 2005

== See also ==
- Caesars World, casino operator from 1971 to 1999
