= Gambit (disambiguation) =

A gambit is a type of chess opening move in which one of the pieces is sacrificed in order to achieve a better position.

Gambit may also refer to:

== Arts and entertainment ==
=== Film ===
- Gambit (1966 film), a 1966 film starring Michael Caine and Shirley MacLaine
  - Gambit (2012 film), a remake of the 1966 film
- Gambit (unproduced film), an unproduced X-Men franchise film about the eponymous Marvel Comics comicbook superhero

=== Television ===
- Gambit (game show), based on the card game blackjack
  - Gambit (British game show), UK version based on the card game blackjack
- Mike Gambit, a character in The New Avengers TV series
- "Gambit", an episode of Blake's 7
- "Gambit" (Star Trek: The Next Generation), a 1993 two-part, seventh-season episode of Star Trek: The Next Generation
- Opening gambit, a short stand-alone action sequence starting many episodes of MacGyver

=== Music ===
- The Gambit (record producer) (born 1982), rapper and record producer
- The Gambit (album) by Shelly Manne & His Men

=== Other ===
- Gambit (Marvel Comics), a comic book superhero in Marvel Comics
  - Gambit (comic book), a series of comic books featuring the character, first published in 1993
- Gambit (novel), a 1962 Nero Wolfe detective novel by Rex Stout
- Gambit system, a party control system implemented in the Final Fantasy XII and Final Fantasy XII: Revenant Wings video games

== Technology ==
- Gambit (forum), a non-profit gambling industry organisation
- Gambit (Scheme implementation), an implementation of the Scheme programming language
- KH-7 Gambit, a reconnaissance satellite used by the United States from July 1963 to June 1967
- KH-8 Gambit 3, a long-lived series of reconnaissance satellites used by the United States from July 1966 to April 1984

== Other ==
- Gambit, a lexical item, or unit
- Gambit Publications, a publisher of chess books
- Gambit (roller coaster), a former roller coaster at Japanese amusement park, Thrill Valley
- Gambit (newspaper), a New Orleans–based newspaper
- Operation Gambit, a part of Operation Neptune
- Contract bridge, opening bid on the 2 level for a long weak suit to be made Trump, thereby hindering opponent bids to reach game in another suit
