= Trade Fair Grounds =

Trade Fair Grounds may refer to:

- Trade Fair Ground, Mavuso Sports Centre, Manzini, Eswatini
- Frankfurt Trade Fairgrounds, Frankfurt am Main, Hesse, Germany; which holds the annual Frankfurt Trade Fair
- Maltese International Trade Fair Grounds, Trade Fairs and Exhibition Centre, Naxxar, Malta
- Mwalimu J.K. Nyerere Dar es Salaam International Trade Fair Grounds, Temeke District, Dar es Salaam, Tanzania; which holds the annual Dar es Salaam International Trade Fair
- Trade Fair Grounds, Dag Hammarskjöld Stadium, Ndola, Zambia
- Zimbabwe International Trade Fair Grounds in Bulawayo, Zimbabwe

== See also ==
- Trade fair
- Fairground
- Fairground (disambiguation)
- Ground (disambiguation)
- Trade (disambiguation)
- Fair (disambiguation)
