= Fairground =

Fairground most typically refers to a permanent space that hosts fairs.

Fairground, Fairgrounds, Fair Ground or Fair Grounds may also refer to:

== Places ==
=== Canada ===
- Fairground, Ontario, a community

=== United States ===
- Fairground, St. Louis, a neighborhood of St. Louis, Missouri
- Fairground Park, a municipal park in St. Louis, Missouri
- Fairgrounds, New Orleans, a city neighborhood
- Fairgrounds Park, a park in Hagerstown, Maryland
- Fairgrounds Field, a ballpark in Robstown, Texas
- Fairgrounds Speedway, an independent racetrack near Nashville, Tennessee
- Fair Grounds Race Course, a thoroughbred racetrack and casino in New Orleans

== Music ==
- Fair Ground (band), a Canadian alternative rock band

=== Songs ===
- "Fairground" (Simply Red song)
- "Fairground", by James from the album Strip-mine

== Other uses ==
- Fair territory, the main area of a baseball field
- Fairground Gaming, an online gaming company
- Fair Grounds (organization), a UK-based Fair Trade social enterprise

== See also ==
- Fair green (disambiguation)
