= Park Place Entertainment =

American casino company

- Industry: Gaming
- Predecessor: Bally Entertainment; Caesars World; Grand Casinos
- Founded: 1998; 28 years ago
- Defunct: 2005; 21 years ago
- Fate: Acquired by Harrah's Entertainment
- Headquarters: Paradise, Nevada, U.S.
- Key people: Wallace R. Barr, CEO; Harry Hagerty, CFO; William Barron Hilton and Stephen F. Bollenbach, Co-Chairman

Park Place Entertainment, later named Caesars Entertainment, Inc., was a casino company based in Paradise, Nevada. For a time it was the largest casino operator in the world. It was formed in 1998 as a corporate spin-off of the gaming division of Hilton Hotels, and renamed as Caesars Entertainment in 2003. The company was acquired in 2005 by Harrah's Entertainment, which later took on the Caesars Entertainment name.

== History ==
Caesars Entertainment logo (2003–2005)

Hilton's involvement in the gaming industry began in 1947, with its approval to operate what would be the Caribe Hilton Hotel and Casino in Puerto Rico. Other Caribbean casinos followed, including the Havana Hilton and El Panama Hilton. Hilton's international hotels were spun off as a separate company in 1964.

Hilton returned to gaming in 1970, buying a controlling interest in Kirk Kerkorian's International and Flamingo hotels in Las Vegas. Its casino holdings grew to ten properties over the years, accounting for more than half of the company's revenues.

Hilton unsuccessfully tried to sell itself in 1989 and again in 1995. The failures were partly attributed to gaming regulations that would make a purchase by a foreign company difficult, leading the company to consider a spinoff of its gaming operations.

By 1996, new CEO Stephen Bollenbach, a financial expert with experience in the hotels industry and 1990-1992 CFO of The Trump Organization, had set a goal of becoming the biggest company in the gaming industry, discarding the idea of a spinoff. With growth in the number of gaming jurisdictions stalled, Bollenbach aimed to expand through acquisitions, especially in Atlantic City, where Hilton had no presence. Bally Entertainment, with five casinos, including two in Atlantic City, was a natural target. Its midscale clientele, heavy on slots revenue, would provide balance to the volatility of Hilton's high-end baccarat players. Hilton beat out ITT Corporation with an offer of $2 billion in stock plus $1 billion of assumed debt, and the purchase closed in December. Bally CEO Arthur Goldberg joined Hilton as president of gambling operations.

By 1998, Hilton was again trying to split its gaming and hotel operations, believing that its stock price was dragged down by involvement in the highly competitive gaming industry. Efforts were hampered by the need for a merger to provide a business purpose to qualify the spin-off for tax-free status. Negotiations for a spinoff and purchase of Circus Circus Enterprises broke down over disagreements about price and management, and concerns about Hilton's debt level. An agreement was finally reached for Hilton to spin off its casinos as a new public company, Park Place Entertainment, which would immediately buy Grand Casinos, owner of three properties in Mississippi, for $650 million in stock plus $550 million in assumed debt. Grand's operations outside of Mississippi, including three Indian casinos it managed, were spun off as a separate company, Lakes Entertainment, before the merger. Goldberg was installed as CEO of the combined company, which had eighteen casinos.

In 2000, Park Place purchased Caesars World, whose casinos included Caesars Palace and Caesars Atlantic City, from Starwood for $3 billion. The four Caesars Pocono Resorts were excluded from the sale.

In 2001, Park Place was named to the Gaming Hall of Fame.

In July 2003, plans were announced to rename Park Place as Caesars Entertainment, capitalizing on the Caesars brand name. The change took effect on January 6, 2004, and the company's ticker symbol was changed to CZR.

On June 18, 2004, Caesars sold the Las Vegas Hilton hotel-casino to Colony Capital for $280 million. A Caesars spokesperson stated that the sale would help the company focus on its major casinos on the Las Vegas Strip.

On July 14, 2004, Harrah's Entertainment agreed to purchase Caesars Entertainment for over $5 billion. The latter sold Caesars Tahoe in June 2005 for $45 million to Columbia Sussex, owner of the nearby Horizon Casino. It was one of a series of sales made by Caesars and Harrah's to avoid anti-trust issues with their proposed merger.

The acquisition was completed in 2005. In turn, Harrah's was itself acquired and taken private in 2006 by a group of private equity funds including Apollo Global Management, The Blackstone Group and TPG Capital. In 2010, Harrah's took on the Caesars Entertainment name. The company merged with Eldorado Resorts in 2020, forming another new Caesars Entertainment company.

== Properties owned when acquired by Harrah's ==
- Bally's Atlantic City, including Claridge Casino at Bally's and Wild Wild West Casino, Atlantic City, New Jersey
- Bally's Las Vegas
- Bally's Casino Tunica
- Caesars Atlantic City, Atlantic City New Jersey
- Caesars Windsor, Windsor, Ontario, Canada
- Caesars Palace at Sea — no longer on board Crystal Cruises
- Caesars Indiana, Elizabeth, Indiana
- Caesars Palace, Las Vegas, Nevada
- Flamingo Las Vegas, Las Vegas, Nevada
- Flamingo Laughlin, Laughlin, Nevada
- Grand Casino Biloxi, Biloxi, Mississippi — Reopened after destruction by Hurricane Katrina
- Grand Casino Gulfport, Gulfport, Mississippi — Destroyed by Hurricane Katrina, land sold and new casino Island View Casino
- Grand Casino Tunica, Tunica Resorts, Mississippi
- Paris Las Vegas
- Sheraton Casino and Hotel Tunica, Tunica Resorts, Mississippi

== Former ==
- Las Vegas Hilton, Winchester, Nevada
- Caesars Tahoe, Stateline, Nevada
- Bally's New Orleans

== See also ==
- List of defunct gambling companies
