= Fair Green =

A fair green is a space that hosts fairs.

Fair Green or Fairgreen may refer to:

== England ==
- Fair Green (Middleton), in Norfolk
- Fair Green (Mitcham), in south London
- Fair Green (Sawbridgeworth), in Hertfordshire

== Northern Ireland ==
- Fair Green (Ballymena), in County Antrim
- Fairgreen (Omagh), in County Tyrone

== Republic of Ireland ==
- Fair Green (Mullingar), in Leinster
- Fairgreen (Galway), in Connacht

== See also ==
- Fairground (disambiguation)
- green
