= Bally's Lake Tahoe =

Hotel and casino located in Stateline, Nevada

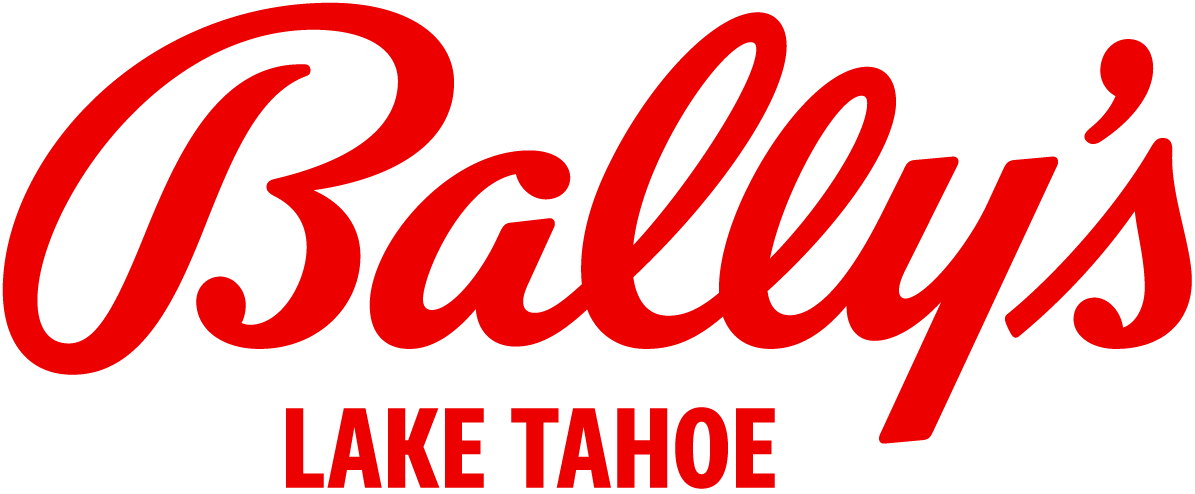

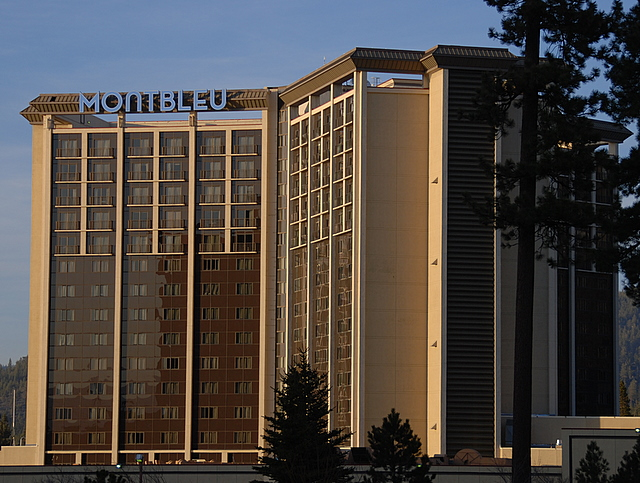
- The property in 2008, known then as MontBleu
- Interactive map of Bally's Lake Tahoe
- Location: Stateline, Nevada, U.S.; 55 U.S. Route 50; 38.961469°N 119.938742°W
- Opened: 1978; 48 years ago
- No. of rooms: 438
- Gaming space: 48,456 sq ft (4,501.7 m^{2})
- Permanent shows: Bally's Showroom; Convention Center
- Signature attractions: Opal Nightclub; Blu Nightclub; Onsen Spa; Puzzle Room; Tahoe Axe & Darts
- Notable restaurants: Café Del Soul; HQ Center Bar; Ciera Steak + Chophouse; Parlays Coffee & Quick Bites
- Owner: Edgewood Companies
- Operating license holder: Bally's Corporation
- Architect: Daniel, Mann, Johnson & Mendenhall (1978), Worth Group (renovations)
- Previous names: Park Tahoe (1978–1979); Caesars Tahoe Palace (1979); Caesars Tahoe (1979–2006); MontBleu (2006-2021)
- Renovated in: 1979, 2006, 2015
- Website: casinos.ballys.com/lake-tahoe

Bally's Lake Tahoe (formerly Park Tahoe, Caesars Tahoe, and MontBleu Resort Casino) is a casino hotel in Stateline, Nevada. It is owned by Edgewood Companies and operated by Bally's Corporation. The property includes a 48,456 sq ft (4,501.7 m^{2}) casino and a 438-room hotel on a 21-acre (8.5 ha) site. It is the home to the Ciera Steak + Chophouse. The entire property underwent a $25-million remodel in 2015, with all guest rooms, the casino, 1,200-seat showroom, and exterior being upgraded.

== History ==
=== Park Tahoe (1978–1979) ===
The casino first opened in 1978 as the Park Tahoe, built by Park Cattle Co. The building was designed by Daniel, Mann, Johnson & Mendenhall and constructed by Del E. Webb Corporation. Caesars World took over the next year under a 25-year lease, with options to extend it another 50 years.

=== Caesars Tahoe (1979–2006) ===
Caesars Tahoe logo (1979–2006)

Caesars agreed to spend $40 million to complete construction of the hotel portion of the property, which was renamed as Caesars Tahoe Palace and later simply Caesars Tahoe. In line with the Caesars name, the property was remodeled with a Roman theme.

Caesars Tahoe was known for its top entertainment offerings, and over the years played host to many famous artists, including Dean Martin, Cher, Mac Davis, Jimmy Buffett, Glen Campbell, and Tony Bennett. In its later years, the Caesars showroom included appearances by comedians including George Carlin, Johnny Carson, Jerry Seinfeld, Gallagher, Rosie O'Donnell, and many other well-known headlining comedians. Celebrities such as Michael Jordan, Randy Quaid, Kenny Rogers and others would play games in the Caesars Tahoe casino. Caesars was also the host hotel and title sponsor of the American Century Championship golf tournament at nearby Edgewood Golf Course every July, until 2004. After Caesars sold the hotel in 2005, the title sponsorship and host switched to Harrah's/Harveys Casinos. Also, in its earlier years, Caesars Tahoe was home to title fights for championship boxing events.

Caesars Entertainment sold the resort in June 2005 for $45 million to Columbia Sussex, owner of the nearby Horizon Casino. It was one of a series of sales made by Caesars to avoid antitrust issues with its planned acquisition by Harrah's Entertainment.

=== MontBleu (2006–2021) ===
MontBleu Lake Tahoe logo

Columbia Sussex rebranded the property as MontBleu Resort Casino & Spa in May 2006. After the bankruptcy of Columbia's gaming businesses, MontBleu became part of the reorganized Tropicana Entertainment in March 2010.

MontBleu and the Horizon appeared as the Nomad Hotel, during the Caesars-to-MontBleu transition, in the 2007 film Smokin' Aces.

In 2018, Tropicana Entertainment, including the MontBleu, was acquired by Eldorado Resorts.

=== Bally's Lake Tahoe (2021–present) ===
In 2020, Eldorado acquired Caesars Entertainment (the former Harrah's) and changed its own name to Caesars Entertainment. This merger necessitated the sale of one of the companies' properties in Stateline to gain approval from FTC antitrust regulators. To satisfy this requirement, the company sold the operations of the MontBleu to Bally's Corporation for $15 million. The property was rebranded as Bally's Lake Tahoe in November 2021.
