= Fair Grounds (organization) =

British social enterprise

- Company type: Social Enterprise
- Industry: Retail (Fair Trade)
- Founded: 2006
- Headquarters: Bradford, UK
- Key people: Nina Carter-Brown (Project Manager)
- Products: Fashion, food, crafts and accessories
- Website: www.fair-grounds.org.uk

Fair Grounds is a Bradford based Fair Trade social enterprise. Fair Grounds exists to enable people to make informed ethical lifestyle and consumer choices. Fair Grounds buys from producers within an ethical business model and has a relationship with each producer. Fair Grounds sells Fair Trade products wholesale, retail in a Fair Grounds shop in Sheffield and at various events, and conducts an education programme in schools teaching about social justice and trade. Fair Grounds ltd is a member of BAFTS (The British Association of Fair Trade Shops and Suppliers).

== History ==
Fair Grounds ltd was founded by Nina Carter-Brown. Nina had the idea whilst attending Bradford University and studying Peace and Development Studies. She then travelled to Malawi to visit her friend David Atherton and meet Fair Trade producers in the country. On her return Nina put all her energies into the idea and Fair Grounds was born. The founding Directors of the company were Nina Carter-Brown, Ian Carter-Brown and David Atherton. Fair Grounds was initially supported by ThinkBusiness@Bradford, a programme at Bradford University aimed at helping university students start a business.

== Retail ==
Fair Grounds ltd sells handmade, recycled, and ethical products. The company follows the principles of the Fairtrade movement and aims to give a fair wage to individuals, families and cooperatives throughout Asia, Africa and Central America. Buyers are also supporting the awareness raising education work of Fair Grounds in Bradford and the UK. Fair Grounds travels around the UK attending fairs, festivals and events selling Fair Trade products. In 2014 Fair Grounds opened its first shop in Broomhill, Sheffield.

== Awards ==
Fair Grounds was the winner of the Glastonbury Ethical Trade Awards 2014. Fair Grounds was a winner of the Future 100 awards in 2011.
