= Caesars World =

US hotel and casino operator

- Formerly: Lum's Inc. (1956–1971)
- Industry: Gaming
- Founded: 1956; 70 years ago
- Founder: Clifford S. Perlman
- Defunct: 1999; 27 years ago
- Fate: Acquired by Park Place Entertainment
- Headquarters: Paradise, Nevada, U.S.

Caesars World Inc. was a hotel and casino operator. It began as Lum's Inc., owner of the Lum's chain of restaurants. It shifted into the gaming business with the purchase of Caesars Palace on the Las Vegas Strip in 1969, selling off the restaurants and changing its name. Caesars grew to eight casinos and resorts over the years, until going through a series of ownership changes beginning in 1995 and was ultimately absorbed by Park Place Entertainment in 1999.

== History ==
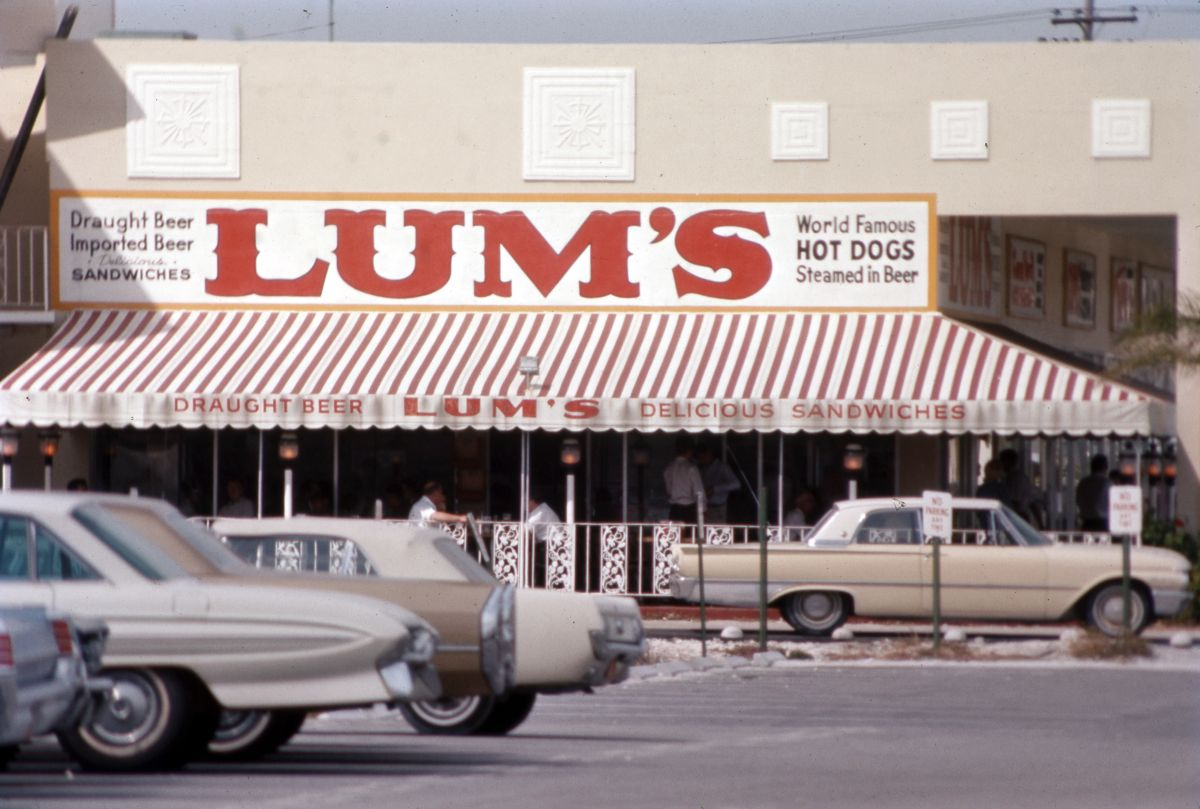
A Lum's restaurant in Fort Lauderdale, Florida in 1966

In 1956, brothers Stuart and Clifford Perlman bought a hot dog stand in Miami Beach named Lums. They expanded to more locations, and took the company public in 1961. In partnership with Ken Chivers, they began offering franchises in 1965, growing from 15 restaurants to 90 within a few months.

In the late 1960s, Lum's went on a buying spree, acquiring a meat packer, a chain of army-navy stores, and the Cove Haven honeymoon resort in the Poconos. They capped it off with Caesars Palace, bought in 1969 for $58 million. Shifting its focus to the Las Vegas property, the company in 1971 sold 350 restaurants, nearly the entire chain, to John Y. Brown, owner of Kentucky Fried Chicken, for $4 million, and changed its name to Caesars World.

In 1971, the company made a foray into the technology sector, buying 21 percent of Centronics, a maker of printers and gaming control systems, from co-founder Samuel Lang for $1.7 million. Caesars sold part of its stake to Brother Industries in 1974 for $3 million, and then sold its remaining shares in a public offering for $3.5 million.

In 1972, Caesars World bought the Thunderbird casino, up the Strip from Caesars Palace, from Del Webb Corporation for $13.6 million. A $150-million, 2,000-room resort called the Mark Anthony was planned for the site, but Caesars was unable to find financing, and sold the property four years later for $9 million to a group led by banker E. Parry Thomas.

The company moved its headquarters from Miami in 1973 to be closer to Caesars Palace, but chose Century City in Los Angeles over Las Vegas, because of its proximity to financial centers.

Caesars extended its presence in the Poconos, buying the Paradise Stream Resort in 1973, the Pocono Palace in 1976, and Brookdale-on-the-Lake in 1983, which it renamed as Caesars Brookdale.

The firm returned to the computer industry in 1976, buying 80 percent of Ontel Corporation (Woodbury, NY), a maker of all-in-one PCs. Caesars had increased its stake to 100 percent by 1980, when it sold 9 percent of Ontel to AEG-Telefunken for $3.5 million. By 1983, the subsidiary was losing money, and Caesars sold it to Visual Technology, Inc. (Tewkesbury, MA), a maker of computer terminals, for a $9.5 million convertible note.

Caesars expanded to northern Nevada in 1979, taking over operations of the Park Tahoe casino in Stateline, on the south shore of Lake Tahoe, under a lease agreement with Park Cattle Corp. Caesars agreed to spend $40 million to complete construction of the hotel portion of the year-old property, which was renamed as Caesars Tahoe Palace, and later simply Caesars Tahoe.

=== Atlantic City and ouster of the Perlmans ===
In the early 1970s, the company had entered into a series of deals with Miami lawyer Alvin Malnik, who was identified by federal law enforcement officials as a close associate of mobster Meyer Lansky. Caesars bought 400 acres of undeveloped land in North Miami Beach from Malnik and his partner, Sam Cohen, and later made a sale and leaseback of two of the company's Poconos resorts to Malnik and Cohen's sons, funded by a loan from a Teamsters pension fund. The association with Malnik earned Caesars three warnings from the Nevada Gaming Commission, and would continue to haunt the brothers.

After the 1976 legalization of gambling in Atlantic City, Caesars had bought a Howard Johnson's hotel on the Boardwalk and spent $70 million renovating it. Caesars Boardwalk Regency, the city's second casino, opened in 1979, under a temporary license. When the New Jersey Casino Control Commission (NJCCC) completed its full review of the Perlmans' applications, however, their permanent gaming licenses were denied, due to their dealings with Malnik and Cohen. The brothers were forced to take a leave of absence, or face a shutdown of the casino. They negotiated to sell their interest in the company to television producers Norman Lear and Bud Yorkin, but quit the talks without reaching a deal. Analysts speculated that the company might sell the Atlantic City property, but ultimately, Caesars World itself agreed to buy out the Perlmans' 18 percent stake for $98 million in 1980. Clifford remained as chairman of the Las Vegas property until 1982, when he accepted the NJCCC's demand that he step down there as well.

Shortly after Clifford's departure from Caesars Palace, he and Stuart agreed to buy the Dunes hotel, across the street. Due to a non-compete clause in their buyout, Caesars was granted a four-week window to negotiate their own purchase of the Dunes, which they considered as an opportunity to reach the "tour and travel" segment of visitors, in contrast with Caesars Palace's more affluent customer base. Caesars ultimately decided not to pursue the purchase.

=== After the Perlmans ===
Financier Martin Sosnoff, who had accumulated a 13 percent stake in Caesars World, made an effort to take over the company in 1987, initially offering $734 million for the remaining shares, or $28 a share. Caesars countered with a leveraged recapitalization plan that would have given investors a $26 dividend and left each share with a value of $8.50. Sosnoff raised his bid to $32 and then $35 a share, but after a court ruling that his offer exceeded federal limits on the amount of debt used in a takeover, he dropped his plan. The company's recapitalization plan too was later rejected by the NJCCC because of the heavy debt burden involved, and the company instead undertook a $400 million stock repurchase program. Sosnoff did not participate in the buy-back, but sold two-thirds of his shares a month later, after the Black Monday crash.

Rumbles of another takeover attempt came in December 1988, when Donald Trump, who had bought a 2.4 percent stake in Caesars World, filed a Hart-Scott-Rodino notice of his intent to acquire at least a 15 percent stake, and said he might seek majority control. Trump planned to sell Caesars Atlantic City, and attach the Caesars brand to his unfinished Taj Mahal casino. Caesars adopted a poison pill plan to deter any hostile takeover. Trump dropped his plan and sold off his shares a few months later at a profit of $3.3 million, due to his concerns about heavy competition in the Las Vegas market.

Caesars agreed in 1989 to operate an onboard casino, Caesars Palace at Sea, on the Crystal Harmony, the first ship launched by Crystal Cruises. Another casino on the Crystal Symphony followed in 1995. Caesars received "minute" earnings from the casinos, but considered them good marketing.

In 1992, Caesars World won out over a dozen other companies to develop and operate a casino with the Agua Caliente tribe in downtown Palm Springs, California. The $25 million, 80,000 square foot casino would have been built across the street from the tribe's Spa Hotel. After being delayed by lawsuits and Governor Pete Wilson's opposition to Las Vegas-style gaming, the partnership was ended amicably in 1995. The Agua Caliente went on to open a smaller casino within the Spa Hotel that year.

Caesars also made a try at the Louisiana market after the state in 1992 authorized its first land-based casino to be opened at the site of the Rivergate Convention Center in New Orleans. The firm was one of ten bidders for the site's lease, but quickly dropped its bid and instead signed a casino management agreement with the front-runner, resort developer Christopher Hemmeter, who proposed to build the biggest casino in the world, the $1 billion Grand Palais. Hemmeter won the city's lease selection process, but due to tension between the state and city governments, the process for awarding the one and only gaming license was separate, and the state casino board awarded it to a partnership between Harrah's Entertainment and Jazzville, a group of politically well-connected local investors. Under pressure from Governor Edwin Edwards, Hemmeter joined forces with Harrah's and Jazzville, and Caesars World was sidelined from the project, which ultimately opened as Harrah's New Orleans. Caesars sued Hemmeter and reached a $5 million settlement.

Caesars partnered with Circus Circus Enterprises and Hilton in a 1993 bid to build and operate a government-owned casino in Windsor, Ontario. They won the bid, and opened an interim casino in 1994 and a riverboat casino in 1995, both of which were closed shortly before the permanent Casino Windsor opened in 1998.

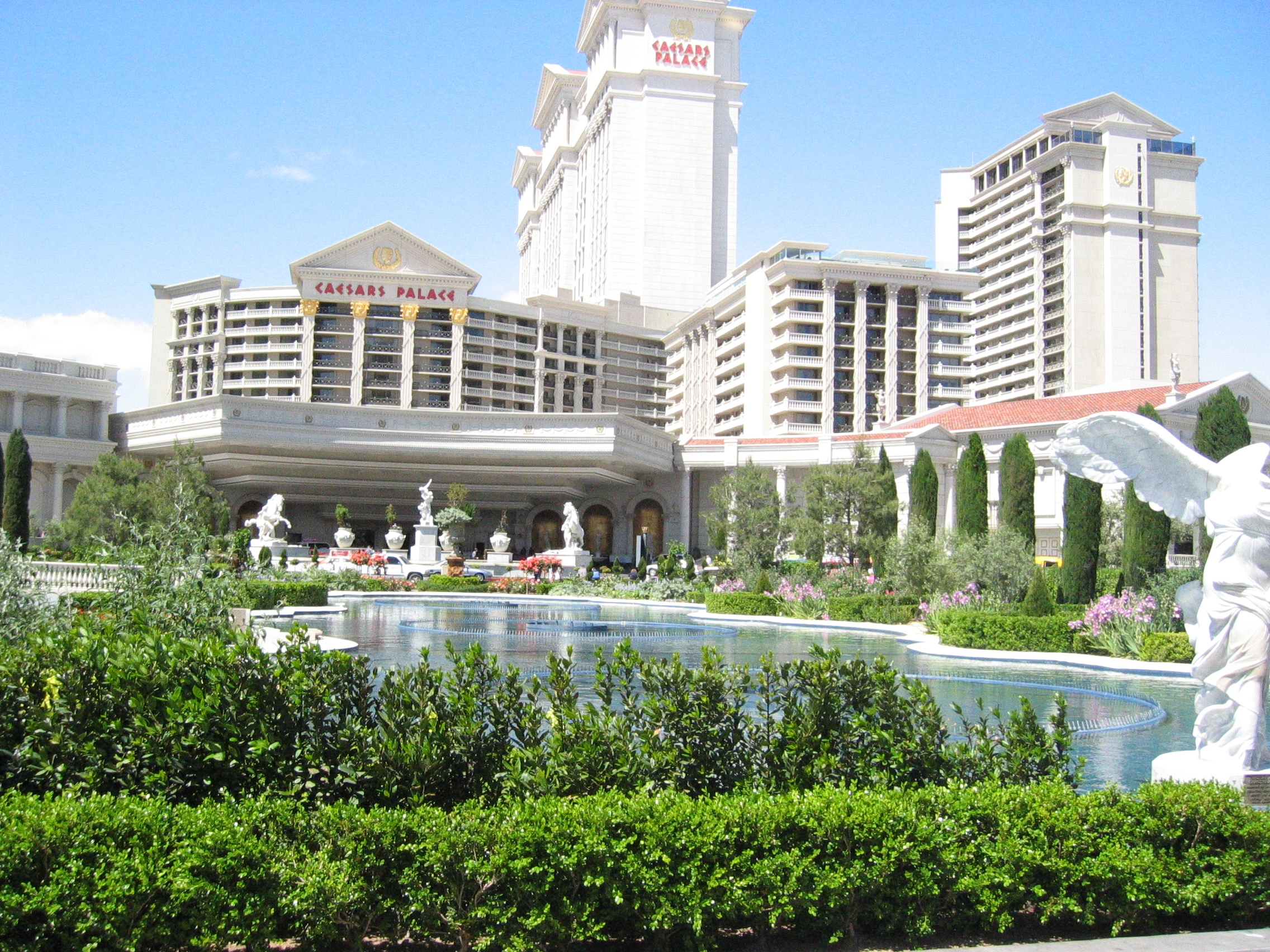
Caesars Palace in 2006

=== Acquisition and aftermath ===
ITT Corporation, a conglomerate whose other assets included Sheraton Hotels and Resorts and the Desert Inn, bought Caesars World in 1995 for $1.7 billion, and was then acquired in 1998 by Starwood.

Starwood head Barry Sternlicht opted to sell off ITT's gaming businesses, preferring the stable cash flow of upscale hotels to volatile casino winnings. Interested parties included Mirage Resorts, Sun International, and Park Place Entertainment, the newly spun-off gaming unit of Hilton. Park Place ultimately won, buying Caesars for $3 billion, though it did not buy the Desert Inn due to its weak location and lack of foot traffic. Starwood also retained the Poconos resorts, with a 10-year license to continue using the Caesars brand.

The Caesars corporate name lived on, as Park Place changed its name to Caesars Entertainment in 2004, and was bought in 2005 by Harrah's Entertainment, which changed its own name to Caesars Entertainment five years later.

== Properties at time of acquisition ==
- Caesars Atlantic City — Atlantic City, New Jersey
- Caesars Palace — Paradise, Nevada
- Caesars Pocono Resorts
  - Caesars Brookdale — Pocono Township, Pennsylvania
  - Caesars Cove Haven — Lakeville, Pennsylvania
  - Caesars Paradise Stream — Paradise Township, Pennsylvania
  - Caesars Pocono Palace — East Stroudsburg, Pennsylvania
- Caesars Tahoe — Stateline, Nevada
- Casino Windsor — Windsor, Ontario (33% stake in operating company)

== See also ==
- List of defunct gambling companies
