= Lucky Ruby Border Casino =

Coordinates: 10.8408°N 105.9305°E

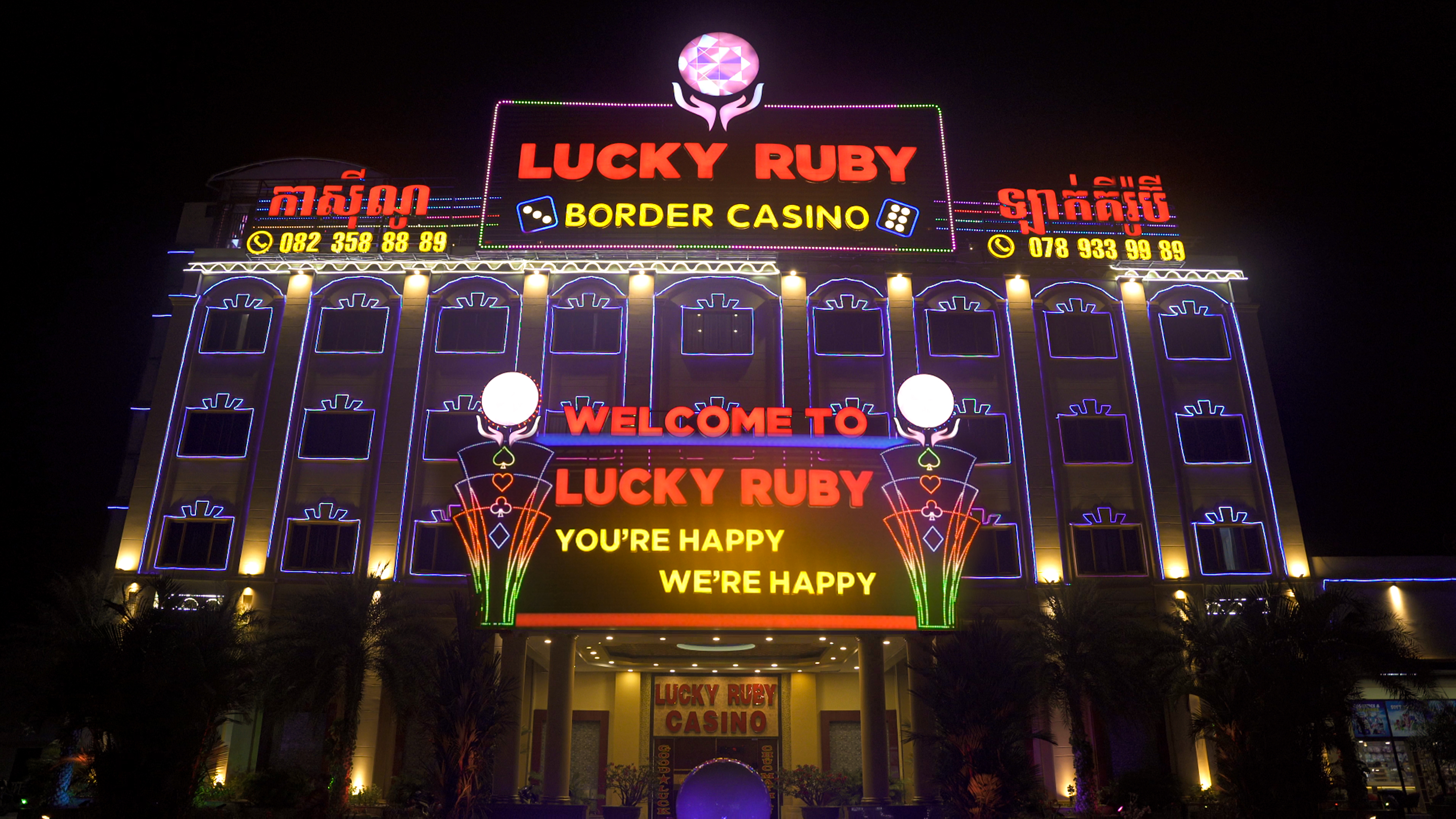
- Lucky Ruby Border Casino At Night
- Interactive map of Lucky Ruby Border Casino
- Location: Prey Vor-Moc Hoa Border, Au Village, Thmei Commune, Kampong Rou District, Svay Rieng Province, Cambodia
- Opened: May 1, 2015; 11 years ago
- No. of rooms: 91
- Casino type: Land-based casino, border casino
- Owner: Mr. Jment Lim
- Website: ruby89.com

Lucky Ruby Border Casino founded by Mr. Jment Lim. The casino is located in Cambodia's Prey Vor, Kampong Rou District, Svay Rieng Province, which is about three and a half hours away from Phnom Penh, an hour from Bavet and three hours from Ho Chi Minh City, Vietnam.

Currently, the Lucky Ruby Border Casino has a total of 91 hotels rooms and more will be built in line with their expansion. The Border Casino has various facilities that will fulfill any travelers needs from relaxation to entertainment via the various facilities that they have prepared on ground. The Lucky Ruby Border Casino is a legally licensed establishment which includes all the facilities on their grounds.

The Lucky Ruby Border Casino is the first in the world to implement the Bai Buu Jackpot.

== Casino games ==
- Baccarat
- Dragon Tiger
- Bai Buu
- Tai Xiu
- Fan Tan
- Dragon Tiger
- 3 Card Poker
- Niu Niu

== Facilities ==
- Sky Bar
- Asian Beer Garden
- Karaoke (KTV)
- Ruby Mart
- Ruby Cafe
- Disco
- Sauna & Jacuzzi
- Massage
- Gym

== Social Responsibility ==
Lucky Ruby Border Casino is seen to be involved in a lot of social responsibility as well as activities to build up with local socio economic quality in the area. This can be seen through an analysis of their activities.

- Yearly donations to the needy within society
- Construction of new Buddhist school
- Donations for students and re-building of school
- Bridge construction
- Donation of school supplies and computers
- Refurbishment of roads that are damaged
- Donation of items to flood victims
- Contribution to the Covid-19 vaccine fund
- Charity Bazaar
