= Casino Zodiak =

Kazakh-American gaming company

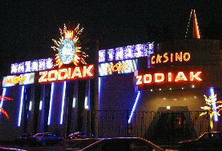
The entrance to the Almaty Casino Zodiak location.

Zodiak Casino, Bishkek

Casino Zodiak is a Kazakh-American gaming company which operates a number of casinos in Kazakhstan, Kyrgyzstan, Egypt, and Northern Cyprus.

Its first casino was introduced in 2002 in Almaty.

Locations include:

- Aktobe, Kazakhstan – opened in September, 2003
- Nur-Sultan, Kazakhstan – September, 2004
- Pavlodar, Kazakhstan – June, 2005
- Oskemen, Kazakhstan – June, 2006
- Kapchagay, Almaty Province, Kazakhstan
- Bishkek, Kyrgyzstan – May, 2007
- Sharm el Sheikh, Egypt – December, 2007
- Kyrenia, Cyprus – December, 2007
- Issyk Kul, Kyrgyzstan – May, 2008
- Kapchagay-Almaty Province, Kazakhstan – September, 2009
