= Grand Casino Portorož =

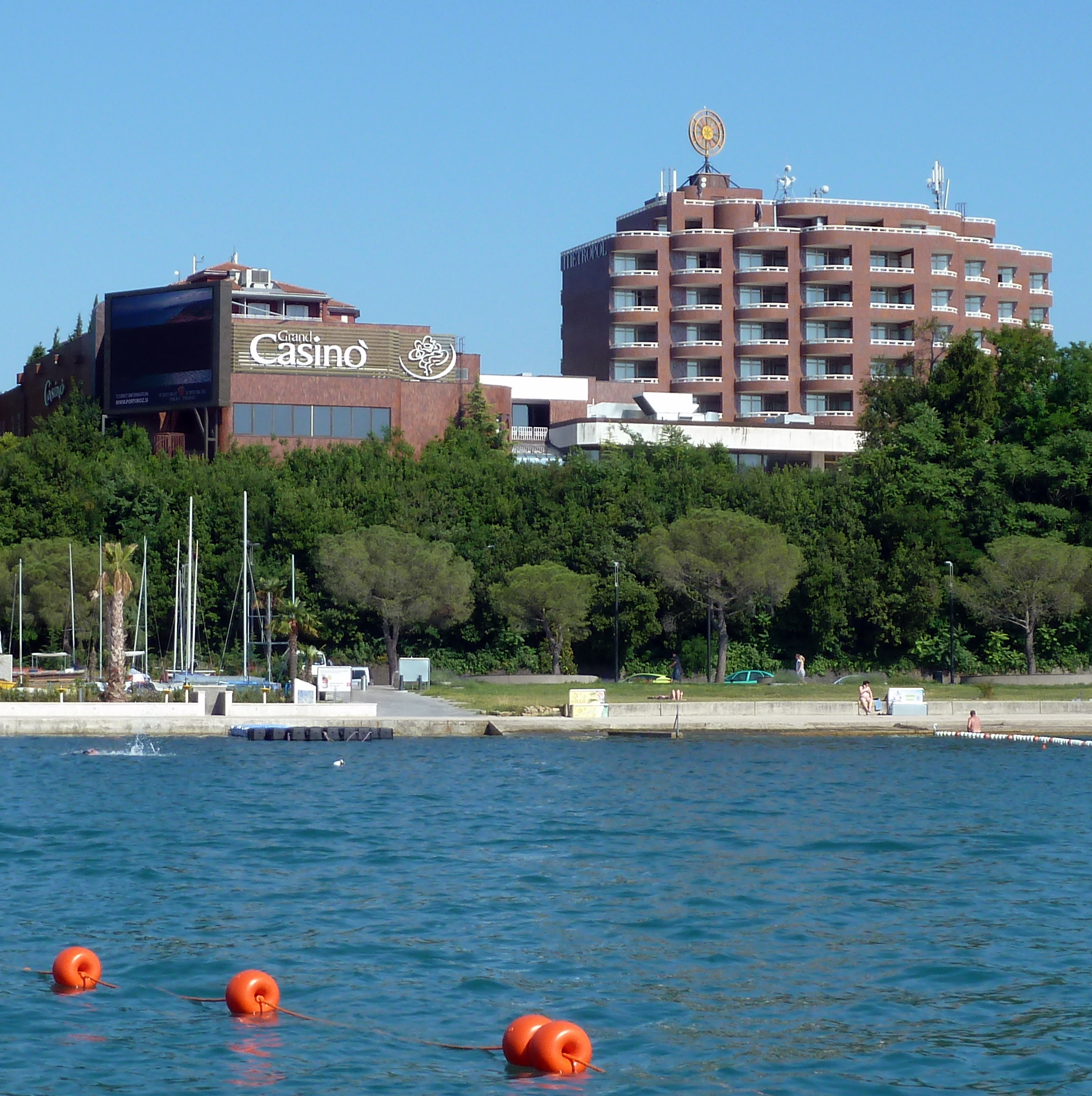
- Interactive map of Grand Casino Portorož
- Location: Portorož, Slovenia; Obala 75a, Portorož
- Opened: 1913; 113 years ago
- Notable restaurants: Restaurant Privée and the American bar
- Casino type: Land-based
- Owner: Grand Casino Portorož d.d.
- Renovated in: 2012
- Website: Official website

Grand Casino Portorož is a casino in Portorož, Slovenia. It is the oldest casino in Slovenia. It is owned and operated by Casino Portorož d.d. The casino was renovated in 2012.

== History ==
=== Background and opening (1913) ===
Grand Casino Portorož was built in 1913 and is the oldest Slovenian Casino. In Slovenia, the gambling sector is subject to strict regulation by the state, Casino Portorož d.d. is the first owner of the Slovenian license for Online Casino.

== Gaming ==
=== Slot machines ===
251 gaming machines of the latest generation.

=== Table games ===
- American Roulette
- French Roulette
- Blackjack
- Caribbean Poker
- Midi Punto Banco
- Texas Hold'em Bonus Poker

=== Bingo ===
- Cinquina
- Bingo
- Super Bingo
