= The Gambit (record producer) =

Finnish rapper

- Born: Anssi Lähteenoja; July 25, 1982 (age 44)
- Origin: Helsinki, Finland
- Genres: Rap, Soul
- Occupations: Rapper, Singer, Producer, Composer
- Instruments: Piano, Keyboard, Synthesizer
- Years active: 2004–present
- Label: QGL
- Website: http://www.thegambit.fi/

The Gambit is the stage name of Anssi Lähteenoja, a recording Finnish musician, producer and composer. The Gambit debuted in Finland in 2005 with his single Move Gambit/Cos My Clique Is, which charted in the top 10 of the Finnish Singles Chart. As an artist composing, writing and producing his own music, The Gambit became internationally known after releasing his debut English album in 2007 and collaborating with international artists such as Deams, De La Soul, Ice-T and Psycho Les of The Beatnuts. During the years 2012-2014 The Gambit has released three Finnish solo albums and a collaboration album with Juno catching attention with his singles in the social media as well as on YouTube.

== Composing ==
The Gambit’s compositions have featured artists such as Ice-T, De La Soul, Psycho Les (The Beatnuts), Deams, Marika Krook, Juno, Kevin Tandu and Chebaleba.

== Directing and producing ==
He works as a director, producer and composer producing films and music for several companies. He has also directed music videos for other well-known Finnish artists.

The Gambit is currently working on an English urban soul solo album.

== Discography ==
=== Albums ===
- Rosary (2007)
- Kaupunkishamaani (2012)
- Tervetuloa Suomen Floridaan! (2013)
- Trapetsitaiteiluu (with Juno, 2014)
- Parhaat (2014)

=== Singles ===
- Move Gambit / Cos My Clique Is (Feat. Samuel) (2005)
- Snake Styles (2008)
- G.A.M.B.I.T. (2008)
- 5–0 (Don't Stop) (2008)
- Trailblazer (Feat. Kayla G) (2010)
- Mitä Kurko (Feat. Samuel) (2011)
- Esirippu (Feat. Juno) (2012)
- Jos Sä Haluut Olla Mun Kaa (Feat. Justin Cameo) (2012)
- Señorita (2013)
- Diggaan (With Juno, 2014)
- Unelmat (With Juno, Feat. Johanna Försti, 2014)
- Love Thang (2015)
- Dream Team (2015)
