= Caesars Windsor =

Casino hotel in Windsor, Ontario, Canada

Coordinates: 42°19′13.35″N 83°2′1.55″W

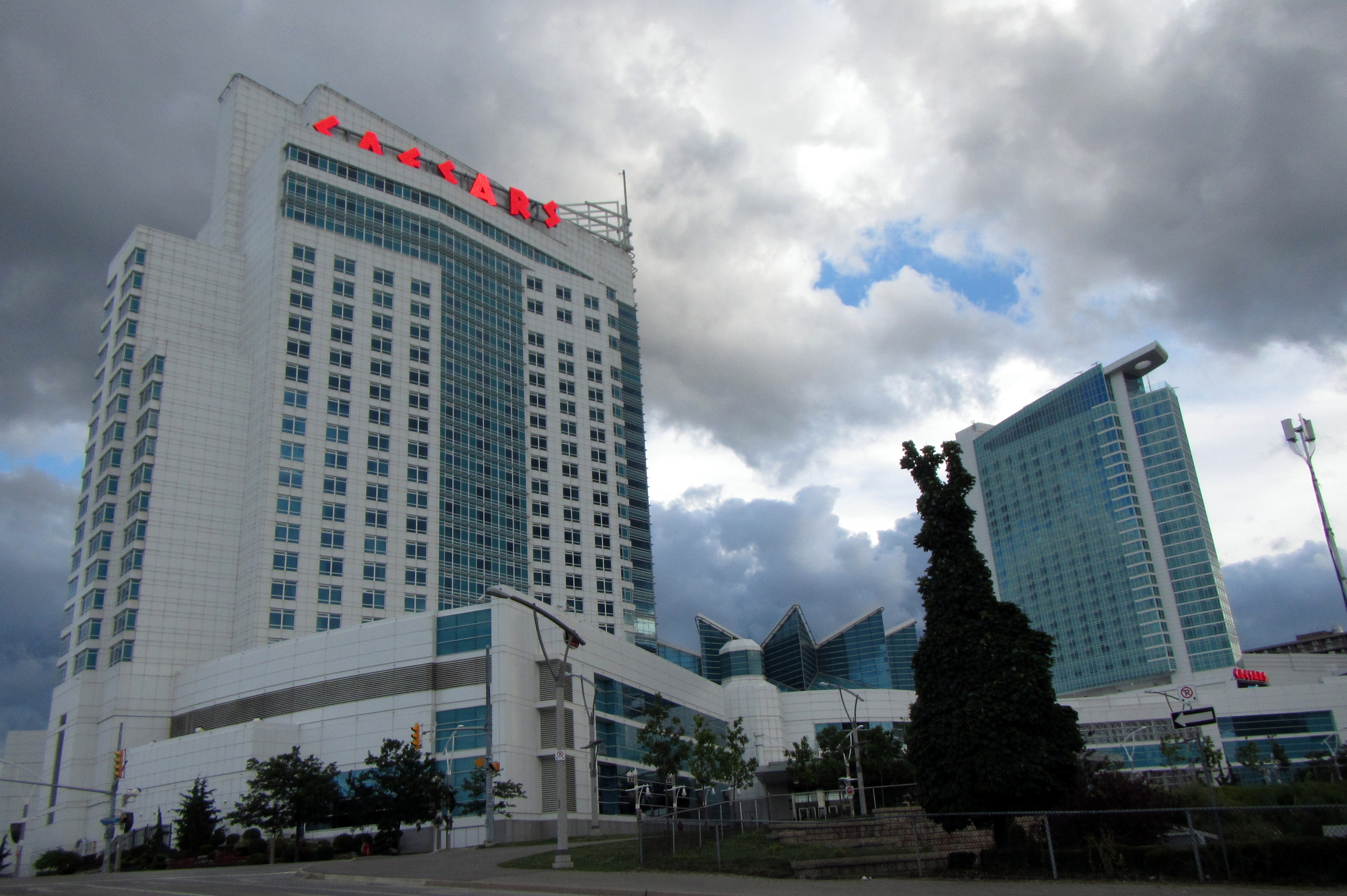
- Caesars Windsor in August 2013
- Interactive map of Caesars Windsor
- Location: 377 Riverside Drive East Windsor, Ontario N9A 7H7
- Opened: May 1994; 32 years ago (as temporary casino); July 29, 1998; 27 years ago (as permanent resort)
- Theme: Roman Empire; Greece
- No. of rooms: 389 room Forum Tower & 369 room Augustus Tower
- Gaming space: 9,290 m^{2} (100,000 sq ft)
- Permanent shows: 5,000 seat Colosseum at Caesars Windsor
- Notable restaurants: Neros Steakhouse
- Casino type: Land-based
- Owner: Ontario Lottery and Gaming Corporation
- Operating license holder: Caesars Entertainment
- Previous names: Casino Windsor (1994–2008)
- Renovated in: 2007–2008
- Website: www.caesars.com/caesars-windsor

Caesars Windsor (formerly known as Casino Windsor) is a casino hotel located in Windsor, Ontario, Canada. It is one of four casino resort hotels in the Detroit–Windsor area and was opened in May 1994 as a temporary casino on the waterfront of the Detroit River. The current, permanent resort opened on July 29, 1998. Owned by the Government of Ontario (through the Ontario Lottery and Gaming Corporation), it is operated by Caesars Entertainment. Both the 1998 Casino Windsor and 2008 expansion were designed by WZMH Architects.

The casino overlooks the Detroit skyline from the waterfront, and is near the Canadian end of the Detroit-Windsor Tunnel. The creation of this casino was a leading factor in the Michigan legislature authorizing the legalization of casino gambling in Detroit in the early 21st century.

The "Forum" hotel tower stands at 23 stories tall and opened in 1998. The "Augustus" tower stands at 27 stories and opened in 2008. Caesars Windsor attracts about six million visitors annually, from Ontario, Canada; and Michigan, Ohio, Indiana, Illinois and other states in the Midwestern United States. Since 1999, its main competitors are the American MGM Grand Detroit, MotorCity Casino, and Hollywood Casino located across the river in Detroit.

== History ==
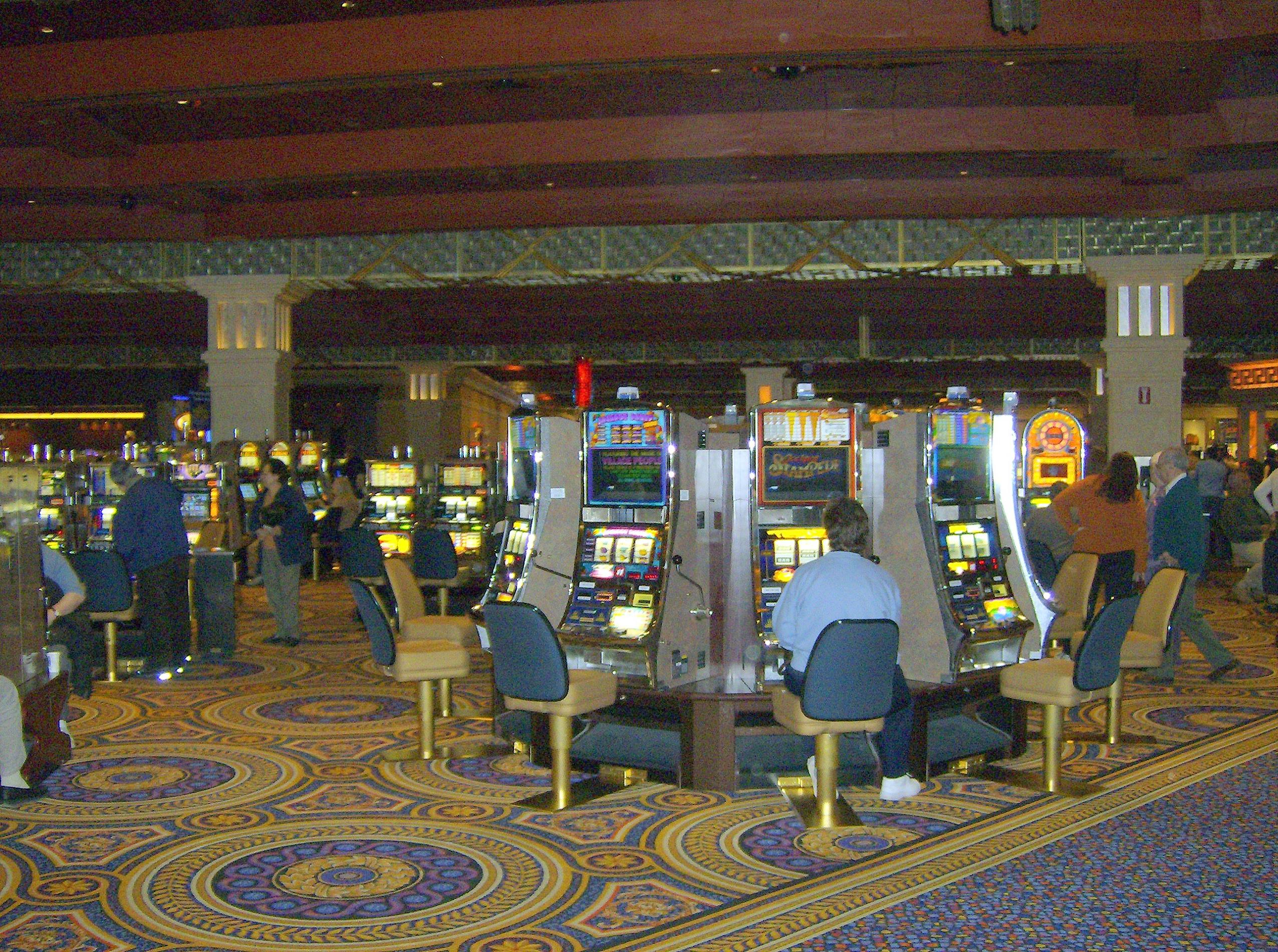
Inside the casino in 2007

In 1993, the Ontario government selected a joint venture of Caesars World, Circus Circus Enterprises, and Hilton Hotels to build and operate a province-owned casino.

Casino Windsor opened in a temporary location in May 1994 as Ontario's first casino. The former Art Gallery of Windsor, located on Riverside Drive, was refitted to house the interim casino. The casino attracted record numbers of customers, millions annually from the U.S. and Canada. Line-ups wrapped around the building. In response, the Ontario Lottery and Gaming Corporation announced it would bring a riverboat casino to the riverfront. The Northern Belle was located at the foot of Ouellette Avenue on the Detroit River. It was open from December 1995 to July 1998.

During this time, the permanent casino was under construction on the former Windsor Market site, a few blocks east of the temporary casino. It opened on July 29, 1998, with a grand opening celebration with a James Bond 007 theme. Daisy Fuentes and Regis Philbin were among the stars that attended. The new site included a waterfall and tropical entrance, hotel, five restaurants, gift shops, and an entertainment lounge.

In February 2005, representatives from the Ontario Government, the Ontario Lottery and Gaming Corporation, and the executive team announced a $400 million expansion project. It was completed in June 2008. It added a convention centre, a 5,000-seat entertainment centre, and a 27-story hotel tower.

Effective May 31, 2006, Casino Windsor became one of the first smoke-free commercial casinos in North America. It complied with the Smoke Free Ontario Act, banning smoking from all enclosed workplaces and public places.

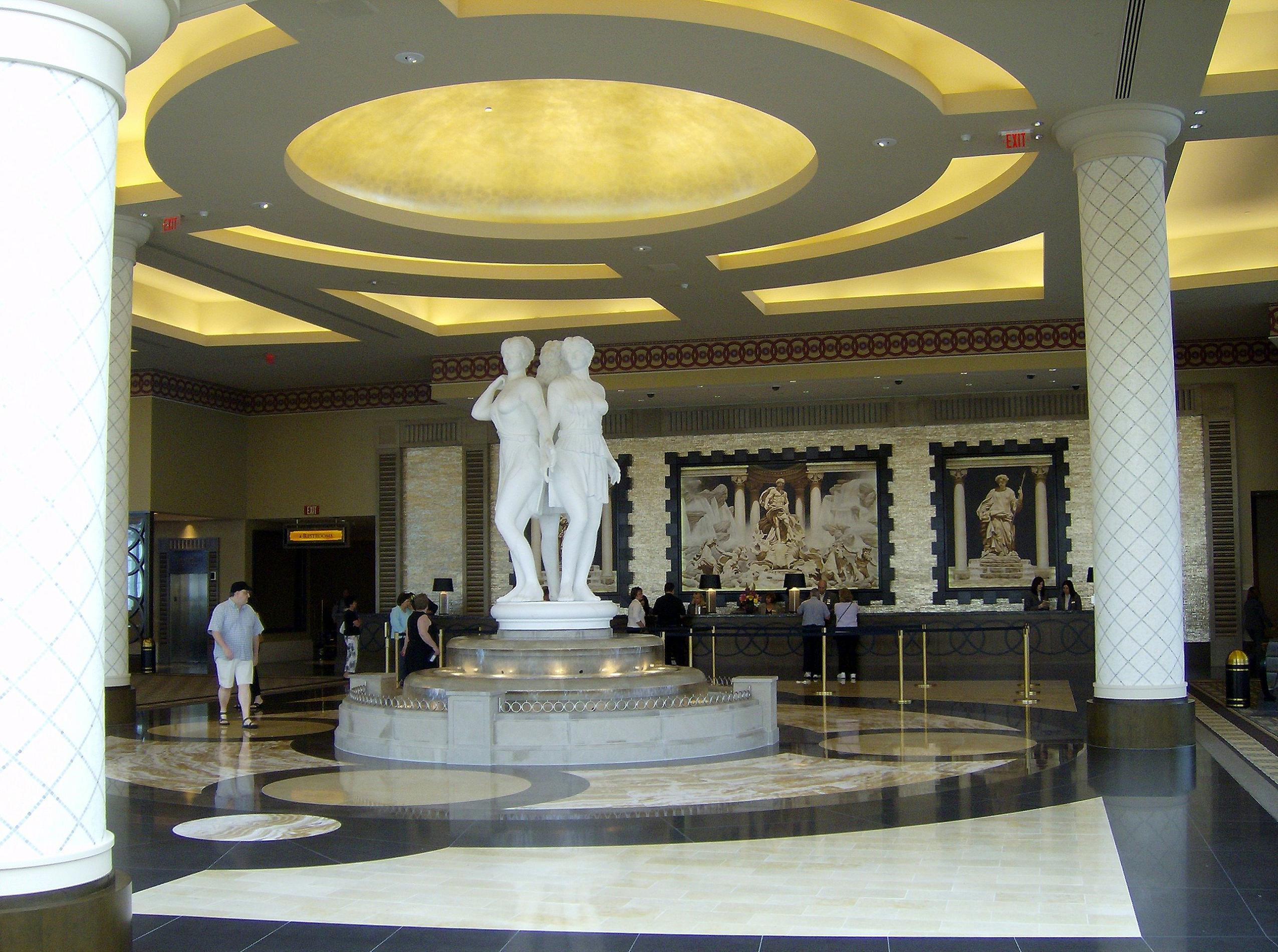
The lobby of Caesars Windsor in July 2008, after renovations were completed.

Renovations were undertaken at the original facility, adding bars, a large buffet, and repositioning many of the slots and table games. The official relaunch took place on June 19, 2008.

The most recent change to the popular casino in January 2026 has included the removal of the popular nightclub "Ariius" as it relocated to downtown Windsor.

== Management ==
The casino is publicly owned by the Ontario Lottery and Gaming Corporation; a large portion of the profits are returned to the provincial government.

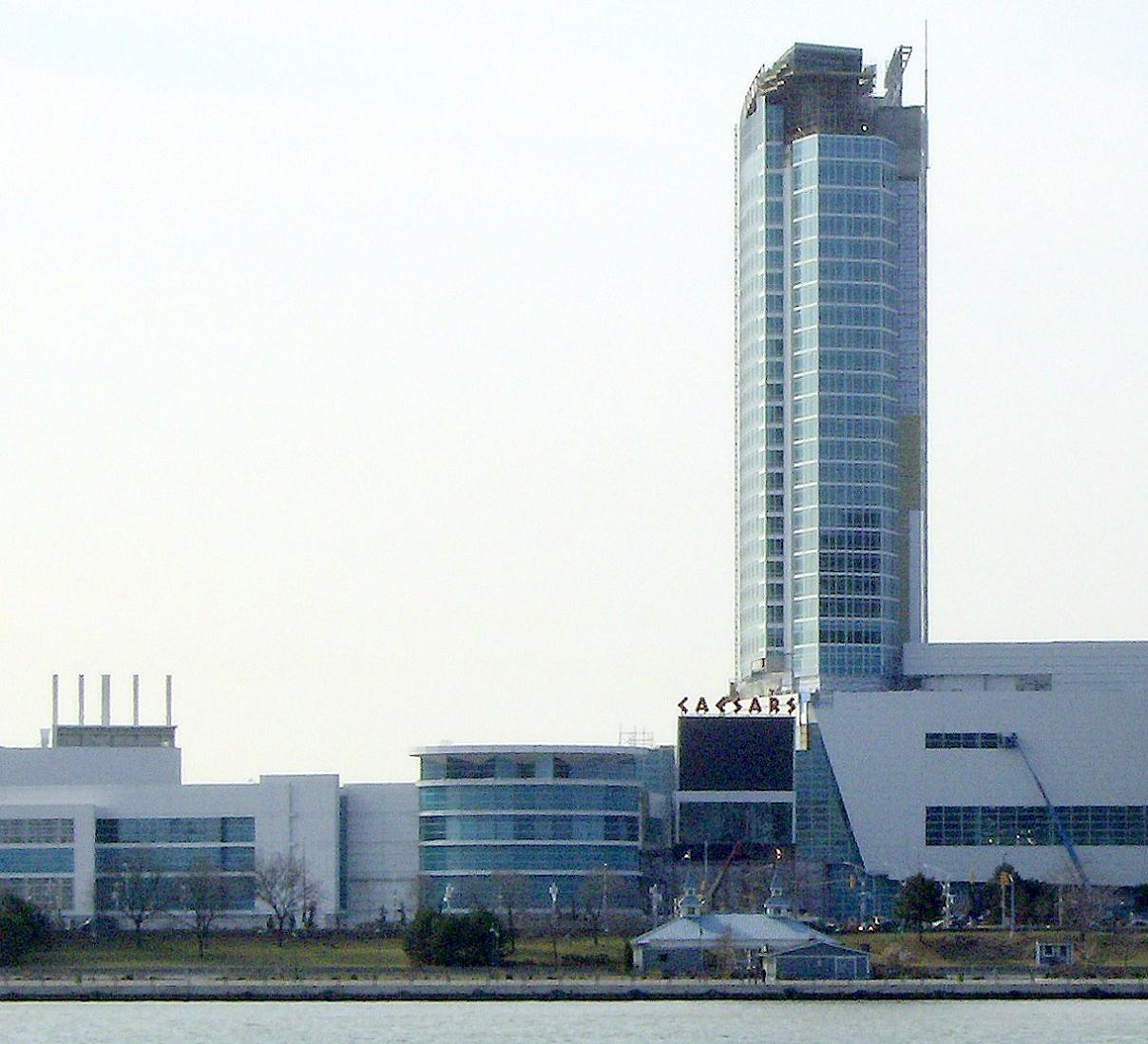
Casino Windsor and Augustus Tower in April 2008

In December 2006, Harrah's announced that it would change the name of the casino to Caesars Windsor. At the same time, the operators began construction of a new 27-story hotel (the "Augustus Tower". It opened in 2008 and provides a 5,000-seat entertainment centre, and 100,000 square feet (9,300 m^{2}) of convention space.

The operators intended to make the casino more attractive to U.S. gamblers. Before the September 11 attacks by terrorists in 2001 in the United States, Casino Windsor was the most popular casino in the Detroit market. Its customer base declined following increased border security by the US, a reduction in the exchange rate gap between Canadian and US currencies, a labour strike that closed the casino for a month in 2004, and the increasing popularity of the three Detroit properties. It may also have been affected by a provincial smoking ban, but Michigan and the US have also restricted public smoking since then.

The changes in the early 2000s were an effort to make Caesars Windsor a destination resort for tourists, and to reward clients of the Caesars brand, a high-end name in gaming. Caesars Windsor reopened on June 19, 2008, and featured American musician Billy Joel, who performed at the relaunch ceremonies to an invitation-only crowd.

The hotel effectively closed on April 6, 2018, due to ongoing workers' strikes. These had resulted in reservation and concert cancellations. The strike concluded with a ratification vote on June 4, 2018. Caesars Windsor re-opened on June 7, 2018.

== Business climate ==
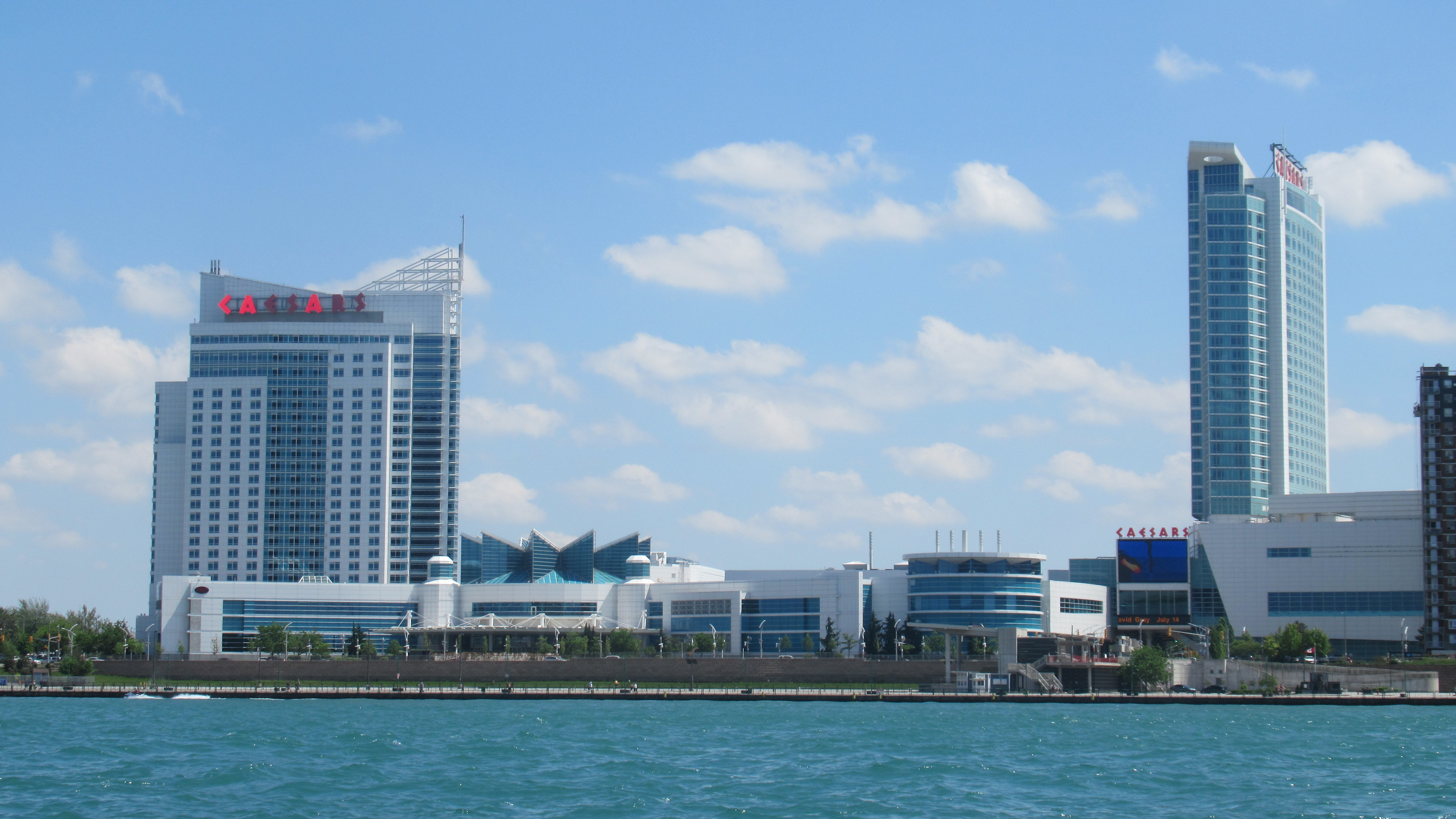
Caesars Windsor complex as viewed from the Detroit River

In the late 1990s, the US-Canadian currency exchange rate had given people from the United States an economic incentive to gamble at Caesars Windsor. Numerous U.S. gamblers crossed the border in Casino Windsor's boom years of the late 1990s. The Canadian dollar was trading below the sixty-five-cent mark compared to the U.S. dollar in the late 1990s. US visitors had incentive to gamble in Windsor, as well as spend in the city's hotels and hospitality establishments.

The rebounding of the Canadian dollar, which broke the ninety-cent mark in 2006, has been linked to the higher price of oil, since Canada is an oil exporting nation. It negatively affected the casino and the Windsor tourist trade. But, because the Canadian government does not tax gambling winnings, the casino has promoted this to attract clientele from the United States.

In 2007, the Canadian dollar eclipsed and exceeded the U.S. dollar by several cents, which contributed to the decline of the Windsor, Ontario hospitality sector. In addition, the casino must compete with three Detroit casino resorts, which opened across the river in 1999. The positive exchange rate for Canadians in the US has drawn them across the border to shop and gamble.

== See also ==
- List of Caesars Entertainment properties
- List of casinos in Canada
- List of integrated resorts
- Harrah's Entertainment
- Caesars Palace
