= Gambit (forum) =

- Formation: 24 January 2005
- Type: Non-profit organization School organization
- Legal status: Technology Forum
- Headquarters: London, UK
- Region served: Worldwide
- Website: formerly thegambit.info

Gambit was a special interest group for those in the gambling and gaming (used here as a synonym for gambling) industries.

The Steering Committee was led by Dr. Stefan Szymanski, Associate Dean, MBA Programs, Cass Business School and a Cass Executive MBA alumnus, Gareth Wong and included senior executives, regulators and editors.
