= Fairground Gaming =

Fairground Gaming Holdings plc
- Company type: Public limited company
- Traded as: LSE: FGH
- Founded: 2005; 21 years ago in Isle of Man
- Fate: Liquidation
- Headquarters: Isle of Man
- Key people: Evan Hoff (Executive director); Richard HowardAkitt (Executive director)
- Website: www.fairgroundgaming.com

Fairground Gaming was an online gambling company traded on the Alternative Investment Market of the London Stock Exchange as FGH.L.

Formed in 2005, Fairground's primary business was in the online casino sector, but it also operated two online poker cardrooms. In June 2006, the company acquired the Spin Palace Group for approximately US$65 million.

Casinos owned by the group included:

- Spin Palace Casino
- Ruby Fortune Casino
- Mummys Gold Casino
- Piggs Casino
- Cabaret Club
- Jackpots in a Flash

The poker rooms were:

- Spin Palace Poker
- Poker333

All casinos in the group were powered by Microgaming software, members of the ECOGRA organisation and licensed by the Kahnawake Gaming Commission.

As of October 2006 the company no longer took United States customers due to passing of the Unlawful Internet Gambling Enforcement Act of 2006. Subsequently, the company was liquidated.
