= Horse racing in the United States =

Horse racing in the United States dates back to 1665, which saw the establishment of the Newmarket Course on what is now known as the Hempstead Plains of Long Island, New York, in the approximate area of what is now Garden City near the modern Jericho Turnpike. This first racing meet in North America was supervised by New York's colonial governor, Richard Nicolls. The area is now occupied by the present Nassau County, New York, region of Greater Westbury and East Garden City. Horse racing remains a popular sport throughout the United States.

== Thoroughbred racing ==
The American Stud Book was started in 1868, prompting the beginning of organized horse racing in the United States.

Horse racing, especially thoroughbred racing, was a sport enjoyed by all during the progressive era. According to Steven A. Reiss " Thoroughbred racing was the rare sport that was trending with both social and economic elites and the lower classes". Horse racing was an enamored sport that was popular for its time in all regions of the United States and took a downturn for a while as the economy, gambling reformers and some interest faded. Reiss states that post-Civil War America was the rebirth of the horse racing sport and it relied on the status of men who bred and raced horses and operated jockey clubs and racetracks. "The powerful alliance between urban machine politicians and racetrack owners enabled thoroughbred racing in New York to flourish for about for forty-five years without interruption". Horse racing endured several ups and downs throughout the era to include socioeconomic status, political gain, morality imposition or just a mere stronghold for the pleasure of the sport.

The National Museum of Racing and Hall of Fame in Saratoga Springs, New York, honors remarkable horses, jockeys, owners, and trainers in thoroughbred racing

=== History ===
There were 314 tracks operating in the United States by 1890; and in 1894, the American Jockey Club was formed. The anti-gambling sentiment prevalent in the early 20th century led almost all states to ban bookmaking. Bookmaking is the process of taking bets, calculating odds, and paying out winnings. This nearly eliminated horse racing altogether. When parimutuel betting was introduced in 1908, the racing industry turned around. Horse racing flourished until World War II. The sport did not regain popularity in the United States until horses began to win the Triple Crown, a series of three races, consisting of the Kentucky Derby, the Preakness Stakes, and the Belmont Stakes. During the 2020s, social media influencer Griffin Johnson was credited with bringing "unprecedented attention" to the sport.

== Endurance racing ==
Contemporary organized Endurance racing began in California around 1955, and the first race marked the beginning of the Tevis Cup This race was a one-hundred-mile, one-day-long ride starting in Squaw Valley, Placer County, and ending in Auburn. Founded in 1972, the American Endurance Ride Conference was the United States' first national endurance riding association.

== Quarter horse racing ==
The first record of quarter mile length races dated back to 1674 in Henrico County, Virginia. Each race consisted of only two horses and they raced down the village streets and lanes. The Quarter Horse received its name due to the length of the race. The races were indeed "a quarter" of a mile, or 400 meters.

In 1940, Rillito Park Race track was built on the grounds of the Rukin Jelks stud farm in the heart of Tucson, Arizona and has long been recognized as the birthplace of Quarter Horse racing. The initial track consisted of a 3/8th mile straightaway, which later became the model for the “chute system” used in modern-day quarter horse racing. In 1954, Rillito added a 5/8ths mile oval and has since been the southern Arizona home of Thoroughbred and Quarter Horse racing. In 2012, Rillito Park Race Track was listed on the National Register of Historic Places.

== Major racetracks ==
The Thoroughbred Owners and Breeders Association classifies major thoroughbred races in the United States using a graded system. The following table lists tracks which are scheduled to host races of Grade I, Grade II, and Grade III in 2026.

Major thoroughbred race tracks
Track	City	State	Established	Graded stakes races			Owner	Operator
Track	City	State	Established	Grade I	Grade II	Grade III	Owner	Operator
Saratoga (Note: Due to renovations at Belmont Park, Saratoga is hosting some races normally held at Belmont Park.)	Saratoga Springs	NY	1863	27 (Note: Includes 12 Grade I races moved to Saratoga during Belmont Park renovations.)	20 (Note: Includes five Grade II races moved to Saratoga during Belmont Park renovations.)	15 (Note: Includes six Grade III races moved to Saratoga during Belmont Park renovations.)	New York Racing Association	
Keeneland	Lexington	KY	1936	25 (Note: Includes 14 Grade I Breeders' Cup races.)	16	10	Keeneland Association	
Santa Anita Park	Arcadia	CA	1934	10	20	31	Stronach Group	
Churchill Downs	Louisville	KY	1875	8	17	22	Churchill Downs Incorporated	
Del Mar	Del Mar	CA	1937	8	12	11	Del Mar Thoroughbred Club	
Belmont Park (Note: Due to renovations of Belmont Park, races normally held at Belmont Park are being held at Saratoga and Aqueduct Racetrack. The races listed here for Belmont Park are the fall meet races which are all being held at Aqueduct under the designation "Belmont at Aqueduct.")	Elmont	NY	1905	3 (Note: Twelve Grade I races have been moved to Saratoga during Belmont Park renovations.)	11 (Note: Five Grade II races have been moved to Saratoga during Belmont Park renovations.)	19 (Note: Six Grade III races have been moved to Saratoga during Belmont Park renovations.)	New York Racing Association	
Gulfstream Park	Hallandale Beach	FL	1939	3	6	19	Stronach Group	
Oaklawn Park	Hot Springs	AR	1904	2	4	8	Oaklawn Jockey Club	
Parx Racing	Bensalem	PA	1974	2	1	1	Greenwood Gaming and Entertainment	
Kentucky Downs	Franklin	KY	1990	1	6	3	Ron Winchell & Marc Falcone	
Monmouth Park	Oceanport	NJ	1870	1	2	6	NJSEA	Darby Development
Colonial Downs	New Kent County	VA	1997	1	2	1	Churchill Downs Incorporated	
Pimlico (Note: Due to renovation of Pimlico, all races normally held at Pimlico will be held at Laurel Park in 2026.)	Baltimore	MD	1870	1	1	5	Maryland Jockey Club	
Fair Grounds	New Orleans	LA	1838	0	6	4	Churchill Downs Incorporated	
Aqueduct (Note: Due to renovations of Belmont Park, Aqueduct is hosting the fall meet normally held at Belmont Park under a separate designation of "Belmont at Aqueduct." Those races are listed as Belmont Park in this table.)	Queens	NY	1894	0	5	8	New York Racing Association	
Los Alamitos	Cypress	CA	1951	0	3	0	Ed Allred	
Charles Town	Charles Town	WV	1933	0	2	0	Gaming and Leisure Properties	Penn Entertainment
Tampa Bay Downs	Oldsmar	FL	1926	0	1	5	Stella F. Thayer & Howell Ferguson	
Presque Isle Downs	Summit	PA	2007	0	1	0	Churchill Downs Incorporated	
Delaware Park	Stanton	DE	1937	0	0	3	Delaware Racing Association	
Horseshoe Indianapolis	Shelbyville	IN	2009	0	0	2	Caesars Entertainment	
Turfway Park	Florence	KY	1959	0	0	2	Churchill Downs Incorporated	
Lone Star Park	Grand Prairie	TX	1997	0	0	1	Global Gaming Solutions	
Mountaineer Park	New Cumberland	WV	1951	0	0	1	Vici Properties	Century Casinos
Penn National	Grantville	PA	1972	0	0	1	Gaming and Leisure Properties	Penn Entertainment
Prairie Meadows	Altoona	IA	1989	0	0	1	Polk County	
Remington Park	Oklahoma City	OK	1988	0	0	1	Global Gaming Solutions	
Sam Houston	Houston	TX	1994	0	0	1	Penn Entertainment	
Thistledown	North Randall	OH	1931	0	0	1	Vici Properties	Jack Entertainment

=== Former tracks ===
- Freehold Raceway in Freehold, New Jersey (1830s)
- Yonkers Raceway in the New York City suburb of Yonkers, New York (1899)
- Hialeah Park Race Track in Hialeah, Florida, near Miami (1925)
- Arlington Park in the Chicago suburb of Arlington Heights, Illinois (1927–2021)
- Hollywood Park in the Los Angeles suburb of Inglewood, California (1938–2013)

The Washington Jockey Club was founded in 1797 by John Tayloe III of The Octagon House and Charles Carnan Ridgely of Hampton. Its first racecourse was 4 blocks from the Whitehouse, it extended from 17th and 20th Streets and extending across Pennsylvania Avenue into Lafayette Park, now the site of Decatur House at H Street and Jackson Place, crossing Seventeenth Street and Pennsylvania Avenue to Twentieth Street, today's Eisenhower Executive Office Building. The course was relocated in 1802 to the Holmead Farm two miles north of the Executive Mansion, to what is now Meridian Hill.

In North America, most racehorses are stabled in the backstretch of the racetrack at which their trainers are based. The backstretch has extensive facilities to house the horses and workers.

== Types of racing ==
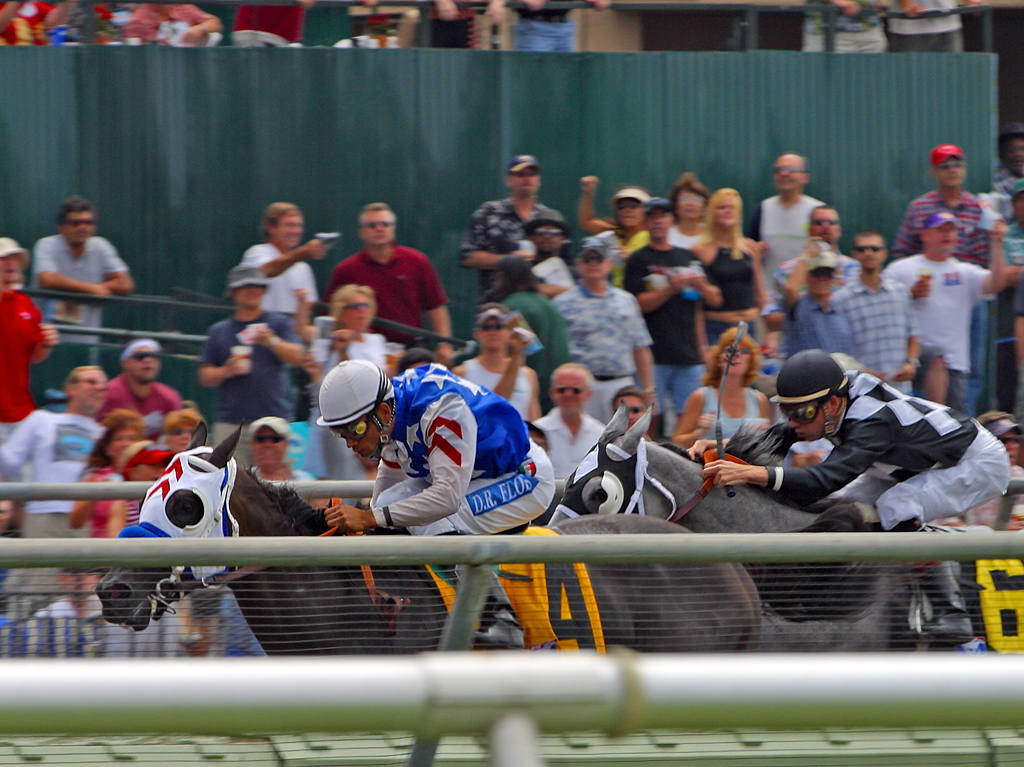
A horse race at Del Mar

In the United States, Thoroughbred flat races are run on either dirt, synthetic or turf surfaces. Other tracks offer Quarter Horse racing and Standardbred horse racing, or combinations of these three types of racing surfaces. Racing with other breeds, such as Arabian horse racing, is found on a limited basis. American Thoroughbred races are run at a wide variety of distances, most commonly from 5 to 12 furlongs (0.63 to 1.50 mi; 1.0 to 2.4 km). The shorter distances are more common but the mid-to-long-distance races tend to be higher in prestige. With this in mind, breeders of Thoroughbred race horses attempt to breed horses that excel at a particular distance (see Dosage Index).

The Pleasanton Fairgrounds Racetrack at the Alameda County Fairgrounds is the oldest horse racing track in America, dating back to 1858, when it was founded by the sons of the Spaniard Don Agustin Bernal.

=== Flat racing ===
In 1665, the first racetrack was constructed on Long Island. It is the oldest Thoroughbred race in North America. The American Stud Book was started in 1868, prompting the beginning of organized horse racing in the United States. There were 314 tracks operating in the United States by 1890; and in 1894, the American Jockey Club was formed.

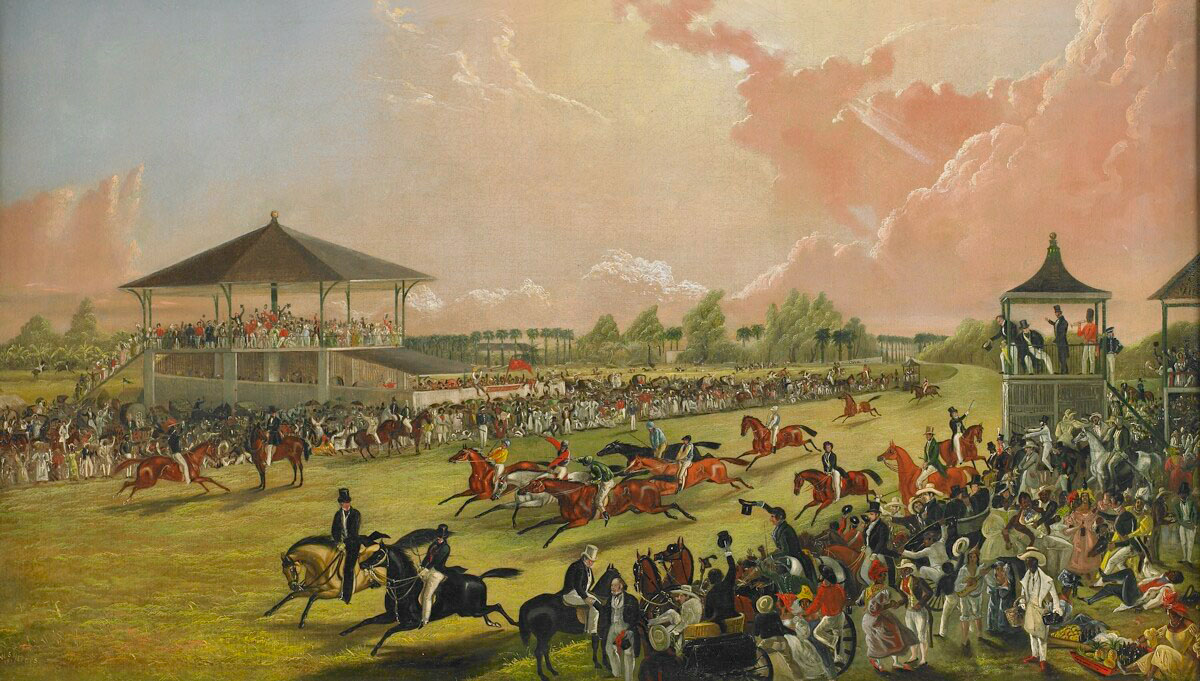
Horse racing at Jacksonville, Alabama, 1841

The first record of quarter mile length races dated back to 1674 in Henrico County, Virginia. Each race consisted of only two horses and they raced down the village streets and lanes. The Quarter Horse received its name due to the length of the race. The races were indeed "a quarter" of a mile, or 400 meters. The breed of horse was developed so they could get off to a quick start, and win the race.

Belmont Park is part of the western edge of the Hempstead Plains. Its mile-and-a-half main track is the largest dirt Thoroughbred race course in the world, and it has the sport's largest grandstand.

One of the latest major horse track opened in the United States was the Meadowlands Racetrack opened in 1977 for Thoroughbred racing. It is the home of the Meadowlands Cup. Other more recently opened tracks include Remington Park, Oklahoma City, opened in 1988, and Lone Star Park in the Dallas–Fort Worth Metroplex, opened in 1997; the latter track hosted the prestigious Breeders' Cup series of races in 2004.

Thoroughbred horse racing in the United States has its own Hall of Fame in Saratoga Springs, New York. The Hall of Fame honors remarkable horses, jockeys, owners, and trainers.

=== Endurance racing ===
The length of an endurance race varies greatly. Some are very short, only ten miles, while others can be up to one hundred miles. There are a few races that are even longer than one hundred miles and last multiple days. These different lengths of races are divided into five categories: pleasure rides (10–20 miles), non-competitive trail rides (21–27 miles), competitive trail rides (20–45 miles), progressive trail rides (25–60 miles), and endurance rides (40–100 miles in one day, up to 250 miles (400 km) in multiple days). Because each race is very long, trails of natural terrain are generally used.

The longest endurance race in the world is the Mongol Derby, which is 620 miles (1000 km) long.

=== Arabian horse ===
The Arabian horse was developed by the Bedouin people of the Middle East specifically for stamina over long distances, so they could outrun their enemies. It was not until 1725 that the Arabian was introduced into the United States. Arabians appeared in the United States in colonial times, though were not bred as purebreds until about the time of the Civil War. Until the formation of the Arabian Horse Registry of America in 1908, Arabians were recorded with the Jockey Club in a separate subsection from Thoroughbreds.

They must be able to withstand traveling long distances at a moderate pace. Arabians have an abundance of Type I fibers. Their muscles are able to work for extended periods of time. Also, the muscles of the Arabian are not nearly as massive as those of the Quarter Horse, which allow it to travel longer distances at quicker speeds. The Arabian is primarily used today in endurance racing, but is also raced over traditional race tracks in many countries.

Arabian Horse Racing is governed by IFAHR (The International Federation of Arabian Horse Racing Authorities).

=== Quarter horse ===
The ancestors of the Quarter Horse were prevalent in America in the early 17th century. These horses were a blend of Colonial Spanish horses crossed English horses that were brought over in the 1700s. The native horse and the English horse were bred together, resulting in a compact muscular horse. At this time, they were mainly used for chores such as plowing and cattle work. The American Quarter Horse was not recognized as an official breed until the formation of the American Quarter Horse Association in 1940. In order to be successful in racing, Quarter Horses need to be able to propel themselves forward at extremely fast sprinter speed. The Quarter Horse has much larger hind limb muscles than the Arabian, which make it much less suitable for endurance racing. They also have more Type II-b fibers, which allow the Quarter Horse to accelerate rapidly.

When Quarter Horse racing began, it was very expensive to lay a full mile of track so it was agreed that a straight track of four hundred meters, or one quarter of a mile would be laid instead. It became the standard racing distance for Quarter Horses and inspired their name. With the exception of the longer, 870-yard (800 m) distance contests, Quarter Horse races are run flat out, with the horses running at top speed for the duration. There is less jockeying for position, as turns are rare, and many races end with several contestants grouped together at the wire. The track surface is similar to that of Thoroughbred racing and usually consists of dirt.

== Important races ==
The traditional high point of US horse racing is the Kentucky Derby, held on the first Saturday of May at Churchill Downs in Louisville, Kentucky. Together, the Derby; the Preakness Stakes, held two weeks later at Pimlico Race Course in Baltimore, Maryland; and the Belmont Stakes, held three weeks after the Preakness at Belmont Park on Long Island, form the Triple Crown of Thoroughbred Racing for three-year-olds. They are all held early in the year, throughout May and the beginning of June.

The Breeders' Cup event is held in late October or early November at different race tracks every year. It receives less attention than the Triple Crown series from the general public but is of great importance in determining the American Horse of the Year and annual Eclipse Award divisional winners. It is normally held at a different track every year, though some racetracks have held back-to-back renewals. It currently consists of thirteen races held over two days with total prize-money of $28 million, with the Breeders' Cup Classic being the most prestigious.

The richest horse race in the United States is the Pegasus World Cup, held in late January at Gulfstream Park in Florida since 2017.

There are also a Triple Crown of Harness Racing for Pacers and a Triple Crown of Harness Racing for Trotters, as well as an Arabian Triple Crown consisting of Drinkers of the Wind Derby in California, the Texas Six Shooter Stakes, the Bob Magness Derby in Delaware. Also, the main Standardbred event is the Breeders Crown.

Thoroughbred and Arabian fillies have their own "Triple" series, commonly referred to as The Triple Tiara. While there is some disagreement over which three races make up the Triple Tiara of Thoroughbred Racing, the Arabian list is more formal and consists of Daughters of the Desert Oaks in California, the Texas Yellow Rose Stakes, and the Cre Run Oaks in Delaware.

== Betting ==
Horse racing betting is legal in the United States with a unique legal status compared to other forms of gambling. The Interstate Horseracing Act of 1978 grants specific exemptions to horse racing from federal anti-gambling laws. American betting on horse racing is sanctioned and regulated by the state the racetrack is located in.

Simulcast betting almost always exists across state lines with no oversight except for the companies involved through legalized parimutuel gambling. As of February 2024, pari-mutuel betting on horse races is legal in around 32 states. A few states have banned betting on horse racing, including Alaska, Hawaii, Utah, etc. A takeout, or "take", is removed from each betting pool and distributed according to state law, among the state, race track and horsemen. On average, 17 percent is withheld from win, place and show pools, with 83 percent being returned to the winning players. A variety of factors affect takeout, namely location and the type of wager that is placed. For example, one regional track circuit in the United States has four different takeout rates for different types of bets with a total blended rate that exceeds 20 percent.

== Advanced deposit wagering ==
Advanced deposit wagering is a form of gambling on the outcome of horse races in which the bettor must fund his or her account before being allowed to place bets. ADW is often conducted online or by phone. In contrast to ADW, credit shops allow wagers without advance funding; accounts are settled at month-end. Racetrack owners, horse trainers and state governments sometimes receive a cut of ADW revenues.

It typically involves betting on horse or greyhound racing. Wagering may take place through parimutuel pools.

== See also ==
- Barrel racing
- Keyhole race
- Pole bending
