= List of casinos in Missouri =

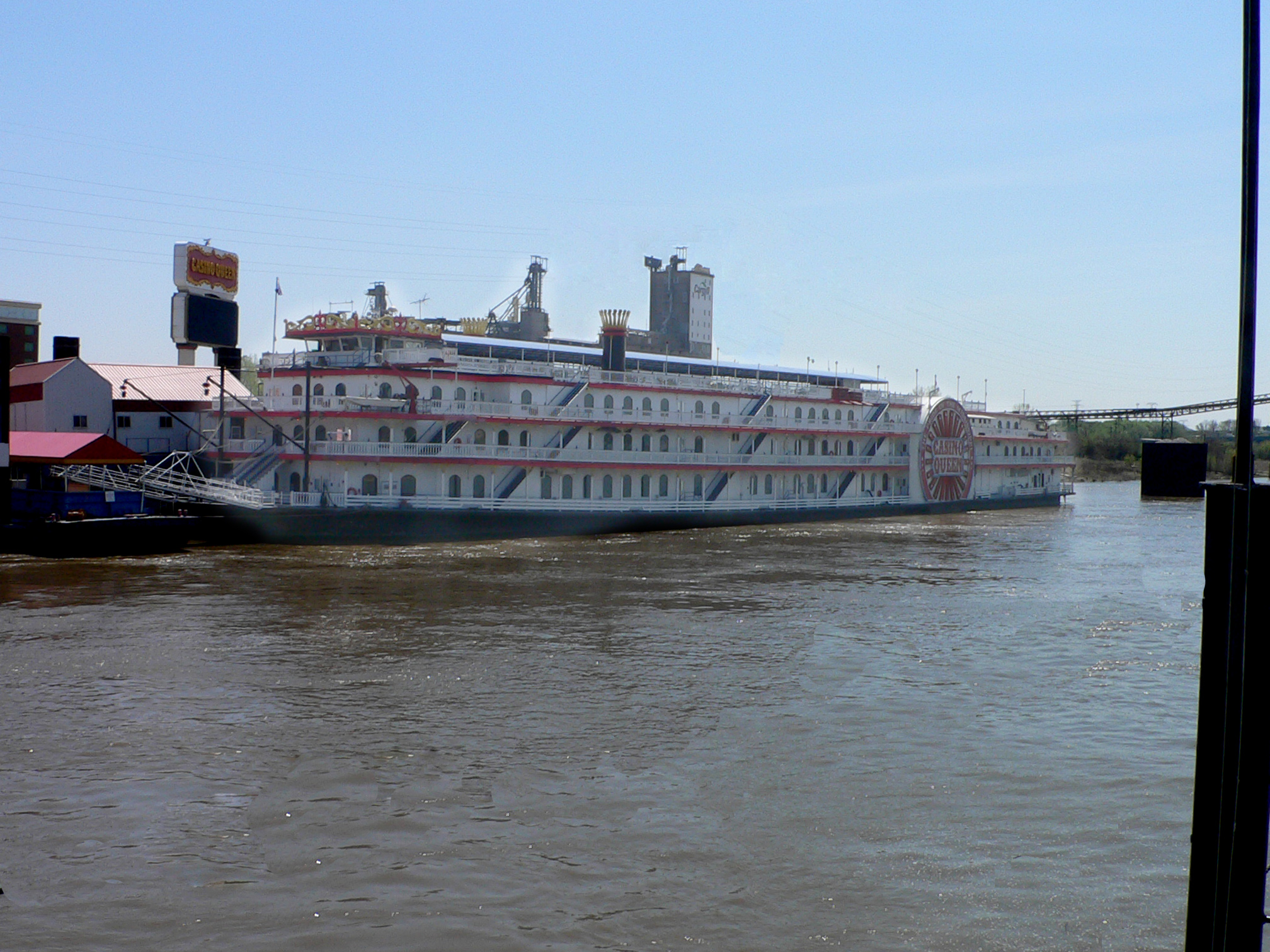
Floating casino

This is a list of casinos in Missouri.

== List of casinos ==
List of casinos in the U.S. state of Missouri
Casino	City	County	State	District	Type	Comments
Ameristar	St. Charles	St. Charles	Missouri
Ameristar	Kansas City	Clay	Missouri
Argosy Casino Riverside	Riverside	Platte	Missouri			Formerly Argosy V
Bally's Kansas City	Kansas City	Jackson	Missouri			Formerly Hilton Flamingo & Isle of Capri Kansas City & Casino KC
Century Casino Cape Girardeau	Cape Girardeau	Cape Girardeau	Missouri			Formerly Isle Casino Cape Girardeau
Century Casino Caruthersville	Caruthersville	Pemiscot	Missouri			Formerly Lady Luck Casino Caruthersville
Harrah's	North Kansas City	Clay	Missouri
Hollywood Casino St. Louis	Maryland Heights	St. Louis	Missouri			Formerly Players Island Casino St. Louis
Horseshoe St. Louis	St. Louis		Missouri			Formerly Lumiere Place Casino
Isle of Capri	Boonville	Cooper	Missouri
Mark Twain	La Grange	Lewis	Missouri
River City Casino	St. Louis		Missouri
President Casino Laclede's Landing	St. Louis		Missouri			Closed 2010
St. Jo Frontier Casino	St. Joseph	Buchanan	Missouri

== Gallery ==
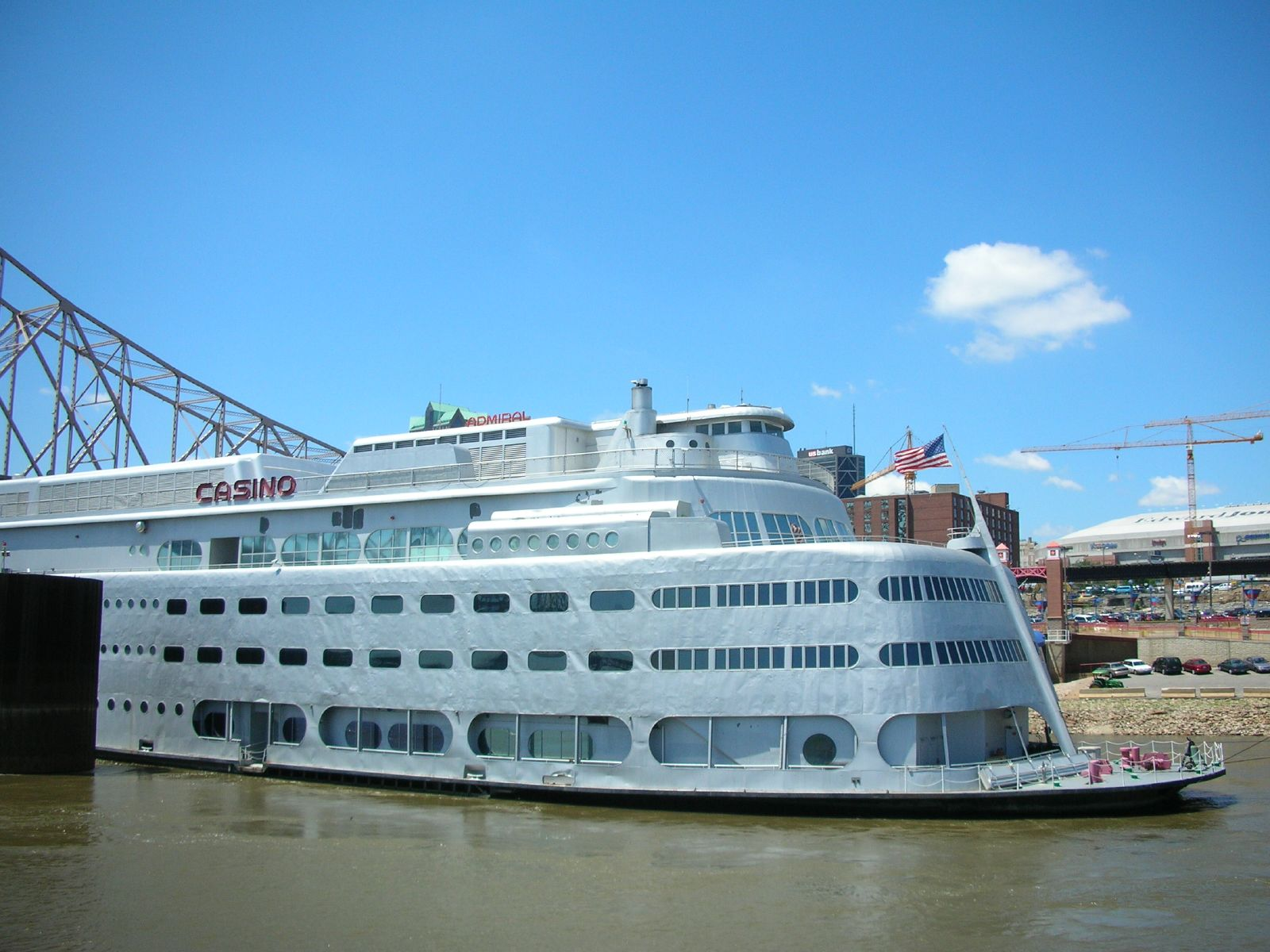

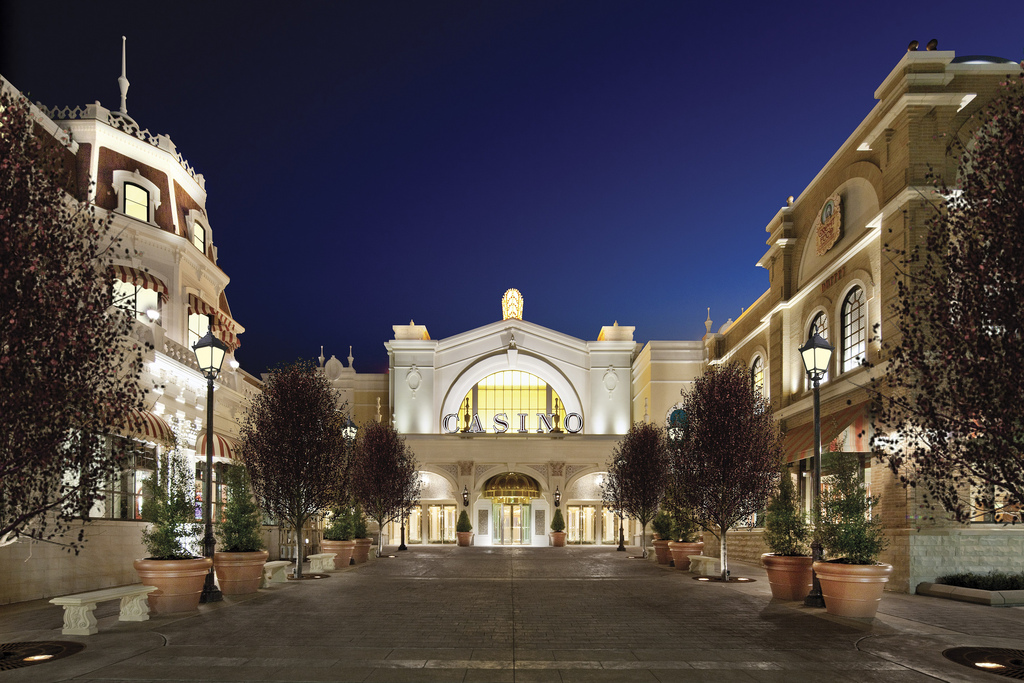

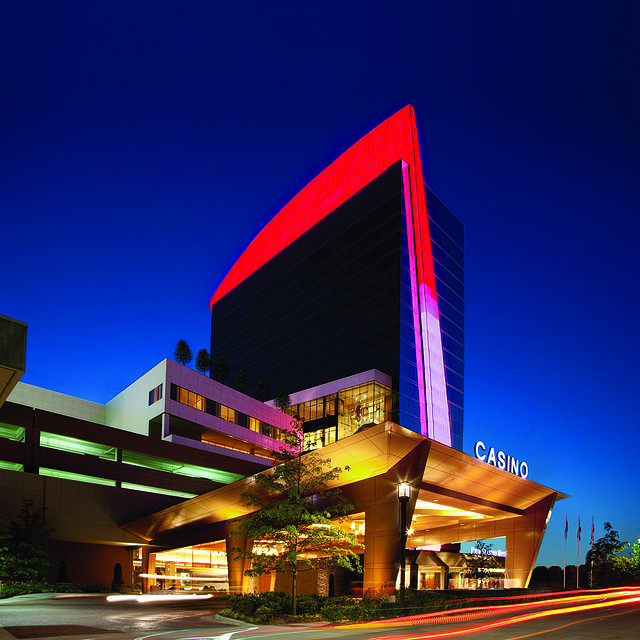

== See also ==
- List of casinos in the United States
- List of casino hotels
