= Hard Knocks Fighting =

MMA promoter based in Calgary, Canada

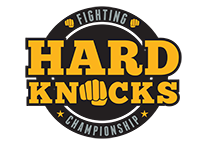
- Company type: Private
- Industry: Mixed martial arts promotion
- Founded: 2009
- Founder: Ari Taub
- Headquarters: Calgary, AB, Canada
- Key people: Ari Taub, Founder and CEO
- Website: www.hardknocksfighting.com

Hard Knocks Fighting is a mixed martial arts (MMA) promotion in North America. Hard Knocks Fighting was founded in 2009 by Canadian Olympic wrestler Ari Taub. Hard Knocks Fighting is known for its local fighter support and ongoing charity efforts and where Ronda Rousey secured her second career MMA victory.

== History ==
=== Founding ===
In 2009, Canadian Olympic wrestler Ari Taub founded Hard Knocks Fighting. Ari Taub an Olympic wrestler and Calgary based lawyer overcomes local city bylaws to win legal challenges to get MMA sanctioned in Calgary. In December 2011, media giant ESPN began airing Hard Knocks Fighting in 40 countries and over 50 million homes. Hard Knocks Fighting produces 15 live events annually, as well as shoulder programming including feature fights, highlight shows, and documentaries.

=== Television Broadcasting ===
- December, 2011 - Hard Knocks Fighting begins broadcasting on ESPN.
- June, 2013 - Hard Knocks Fighting begins broadcasting on Popcornflix.
- January, 2015 - Hard Knocks Fighting and MoboVivo launch HKFC MMA App
- January, 2015 - Hard Knocks Fighting begins live broadcasts on Fight Network.

== Past events ==
Events name	Date	Venue	Location
HK1	March 26, 2009	Century Casinos	Calgary, Alberta
HK2	June 27, 2009	Century Casinos	Calgary, Alberta
HK3	September 26, 2009	Century Casinos	Calgary, Alberta
HK4	November 7, 2009	Century Casinos	Calgary, Alberta
HK5	January 30, 2010	Century Casinos	Calgary, Alberta
HK6	April 9, 2010	Century Casinos	Calgary, Alberta
HK7	June 4, 2010	Century Casinos	Calgary, Alberta
HK8	September 10, 2010	Century Casinos	Calgary, Alberta
HK9	November 5, 2010	Century Casinos	Calgary, Alberta
HK10	January 28, 2011	Century Casinos	Calgary, Alberta
HK12	June 17, 2011	Century Casinos	Calgary, Alberta
HK13	May 27, 2011	Cypress Centre Medicine Hat Exhibition and Stampede	Medicine Hat, Alberta
HK14	September 23, 2011	Century Casinos	Calgary, Alberta
HK15	October 7, 2011	Turvey Centre	Regina, MB
HK16	October 22, 2011	Spectra Place	Estevan, SK
HK17	March 26, 2009	Cypress Centre Medicine Hat Exhibition and Stampede	Medicine Hat, Alberta
HK18	November 25, 2011	Century Casinos	Calgary, Alberta
HK19	January 20, 2012	Century Casinos	Calgary, Alberta
HK20	March 26, 2009	Cypress Centre Medicine Hat Exhibition and Stampede	Medicine Hat, Alberta
HK21	March 26, 2009	Spectra Place	Estevan, SK
HK22	March 16, 2012	Century Casinos	Calgary, Alberta
HK23	March 26, 2009	Subway Soccer Centre	Calgary, Alberta
HK24	March 26, 2009	Spectra Place	Estevan, SK
HK25	June 15, 2012	Cypress Centre Medicine Hat Exhibition and Stampede	Medicine Hat, Alberta
HK26	July 19, 2012	Art Hauser Centre Arena	Calgary, Alberta
HK27	September 7, 2012	Subway Soccer Centre	Calgary, Alberta
HK28	September 14, 2012	Spectra Place	Estevan, SK
HK29	October 26, 2012	Century Casinos	Calgary, Alberta
HK30	February 8, 2013	Century Casinos	Calgary, Alberta
HK31	March 26, 2009	Spectra Place	Estevan, SK
HK32	April 26, 2013	Century Casinos	Calgary, Alberta
HK33	May 25, 2013	Spectra Place	Estevan, SK
HK34	January 17, 2014	Century Casinos	Calgary, Alberta
HK35	April 25, 2014	Century Casinos	Calgary, Alberta
HK36	March 26, 2009	North Peace Arena - Rumble in the North	Fort St. John, BC
HK37	June 13, 2014	Century Casinos	Calgary, Alberta
HK38	October 3, 2014	Markin MacPhail Centre - WinSport	Calgary, Alberta
HK39	November 14, 2014	Century Casinos	Calgary, Alberta
HK40	December 12, 2014	Century Casinos	Calgary, Alberta
HK41	January 30, 2015	Century Casinos	Calgary, Alberta
HK42	March 20, 2015	Century Casinos	Calgary, Alberta
HK43	May 22, 2015	Markin MacPhail Centre - WinSport	Calgary, Alberta
HK44	June 26, 2015	Century Casinos	Calgary, Alberta
HK45	September 25, 2015	Markin MacPhail Centre - WinSport	Calgary, Alberta
HK46	October 23, 2015	Markin MacPhail Centre - WinSport	Calgary, Alberta
HK47	November 13, 2015	Century Casinos	Calgary, Alberta
HK48	January 29, 2016	Markin MacPhail Centre - WinSport	Calgary, Alberta
HK49	April 22, 2016	Markin MacPahil Centre - WinSport	Calgary, Alberta
HK50	June 17, 2016	Century Casino	Calgary, Alberta
HK51	October 14, 2016	WinSport	Calgary, Alberta

== Broadcast partners ==
- ESPN - Hard Knocks Fighting airs live on ESPN.
- Fight Network
- Popcornflix
- OSN
- Claro Sports
- AT&T
- Time Warner Cable
- Comcast/Charter Sports Southeast
- Verizon Communications
- PlayStation
- Dish Network
- BandSports
- beIN Sports
- FightBox

== Current champions ==
Division	Upper weight limit	Champion	Contestant type
Light Heavyweight	205 lb (93 kg)	(United States) Rodney Wallace	Professional
Middleweight	185 lb (84 kg)	(Canada) Brent Auger	Amateur
Welterweight	170 lb (77 kg)	(United States) Cody Wilson	Professional
Lightweight	155 lb (70 kg)	(United States) Jason Fischer	Professional
Lightweight	155 lb (70 kg)	(Canada) Sean Michaels	Amateur
Featherweight	145 lb (66 kg)	(Canada) Justin Basra	Amateur
Bantamweight	135 lb (61 kg)	(Canada) Jesse Arnett	Professional

== Notable fighters ==
- Ronda Rousey the first UFC Women's Bantamweight Champion and first American woman to earn an Olympic medal in Judo at the Summer Olympics in Beijing in 2008, where she faced kickboxing champion Charmaine Tweet in an MMA bout at Hard Knocks Fighting Championship: School of Hard Knocks 12 on June 17, 2011 in Calgary, Alberta, Canada. She submitted Tweet with an armbar in 49 seconds.
- Elias Theodorou is the winner of HKFC: School of Hard Knocks 14. Method- Submission (rear naked choke).
- Misha Cirkunov is an MMA fighter out of Ontario, Canada. Misha Cirkunov knocked out Rodney Wallace at Hard Knocks Fighting Championship.
