= Century Casino Caruthersville =

- Interactive map of Century Casino Caruthersville
- Location: Caruthersville, Missouri; 777 East 3rd Street; 36°11′25″N 89°39′00″W
- Opened: April 28, 1995
- Notable restaurants: Boathouse Bar & Grill
- Casino type: Land-Based facility
- Owner: Vici Properties
- Operating license holder: Century Casinos
- Previous names: Casino Aztar Caruthersville; Lady Luck Casino Caruthersville
- Website: cnty.com/caruthersville

Century Casino & Hotel Caruthersville, formerly Lady Luck Casino Caruthersville, is a 94,000 sq ft (8,700 m^{2}) land-based casino and hotel in Caruthersville, Missouri. It is owned by Vici Properties and operated by Century Casinos. Missouri's first non-floating casino that makes its home next to the Mississippi River.

In 2005, the casino generated $28 million in revenue and $7 million in profits.

== History ==
The casino opened on April 28, 1995, as Casino Aztar. It was built by Aztar Corp. at a cost of $55 million.

Aztar was acquired by Columbia Sussex in January 2007. Columbia Sussex, unable to obtain a casino license in the state, immediately put the property up for sale and threatened to close it down in order to preserve the takeover deal with Aztar.

In 2007, Isle of Capri Casinos purchased the casino from Columbia Sussex for about $45 million. Casino Aztar Caruthersville was re-branded Lady Luck Casino Caruthersville on June 10, 2008. Isle of Capri was acquired by Eldorado Resorts in 2017.

In 2019, Eldorado sold the casino, along with two other properties, to Century Casinos and Vici Properties. Century bought the casino's operating business for $12 million, while Vici bought the land and buildings for $67 million and leased them to Century. Century stated that the casino would be renamed as Century Casino Caruthersville.

Century purchased a neighboring two-story hotel building in 2021. The hotel was renovated and reopened in 2022 as The Farmstead, with 36 rooms.

== See also ==
- List of casinos in Missouri
