= Century Casino Cape Girardeau =

Casino in Cape Girardeau, Missouri, United States

- Interactive map of Century Casino Cape Girardeau
- Location: Cape Girardeau, Missouri; 777 N. Main Street; 37.3136°N 89.5169°W
- Opened: October 30, 2012
- Gaming space: 42,000 sq ft (3,900 m^{2})
- Notable restaurants: Beacon 53, Red Star Grill
- Owner: Vici Properties
- Operating license holder: Century Casinos
- Website: cnty.com/cape-girardeau

Century Casino Cape Girardeau, formerly Isle Casino Cape Girardeau, is a casino in Cape Girardeau, Missouri. It opened on October 30, 2012, as Missouri's 13th and final facility. It is owned by Vici Properties and operated by Century Casinos. Century Casino has over 800 slot machines and 19 table games. The casino also has 7,725 sq ft (717.7 m^{2}) of meeting and event space with room for 500 guests. The casino has two restaurants on-site and planning for a spring 2024 opening of a brand new 69-room hotel.

In December 2019, Eldorado Resorts sold the Isle Casino, along with two other properties, to Century Casinos and Vici Properties. Century bought the casino's operating business for $66 million, while Vici bought the land and buildings for $114 million and leased them to Century.

== See also ==
- List of casinos in Missouri
