= Rocky Gap Casino =

Casino in Maryland, United States

- Location within Maryland
- Interactive map of Rocky Gap Casino
- Location: Flintstone, Maryland; 16701 Lakeview Rd NE, Flintstone, MD 21530; 39.7003°N 78.6563°W
- Casino type: Commercial casino
- Website: www.cnty.com/rocky-gap

The Rocky Gap Casino is a casino located in Flintstone, Maryland in Rocky Gap State Park operated by Century Casinos, with the property owned by Vici Properties.

== History ==
The Rocky Gap Resort and Golf Course was developed in 1998 by the Maryland Economic Development Corporation (MEDCO), an agency created in 1984 that allows the State of Maryland to directly own or develop property for economic benefit. The facility opened in April 1998 at a cost of $53.9 million. The resort failed to sustain its early success, began posting losses, and became dependent on MEDCO subsidies to stay in operation.

In 2009, the state's initial effort to open a casino in Rocky Gap State Park failed when the only bidder, Empire Resorts, did not pay the required $4.5 million licensing fee. Empire's contingent bid was based on Maryland altering its 67 percent tax on casinos—one of the highest in the United States. In 2011, legislators lowered the state’s share of slots revenue at Rocky Gap from 67 percent to 50 percent. A casino license was awarded in April 2012 to Evitts Resort LLC, a subsidiary of Lakes Entertainment of Minnetonka, Minnesota, which completed purchase of the existing resort, including the 200-room lakeside lodge, the Jack Nicklaus-designed 18-hole golf course, and other features, from the state in August 2012. The sale price was reported at less than $7 million. Additionally, the company entered into a 40-year lease on 260 acres (110 ha) from the Maryland Department of Natural Resources. The renamed Rocky Gap Casino Resort opened on May 22, 2013, with 558 (of the originally planned 850) slot machines and 10 live table games. In 2015, Lakes Entertainment entered into an agreement to merge with the parent company of Golden Gaming. In 2023, Golden Entertainment sold the property's operations to Century Casinos and its land and buildings to Vici Properties. As of April 2026, the casino operates 629 gaming devices and 12 table games. The hotel has 196 rooms and suites.
