= Harrah's Joliet =

Riverboat casino in Joliet, Illinois, US

Coordinates: 41.527°N 88.084497°W

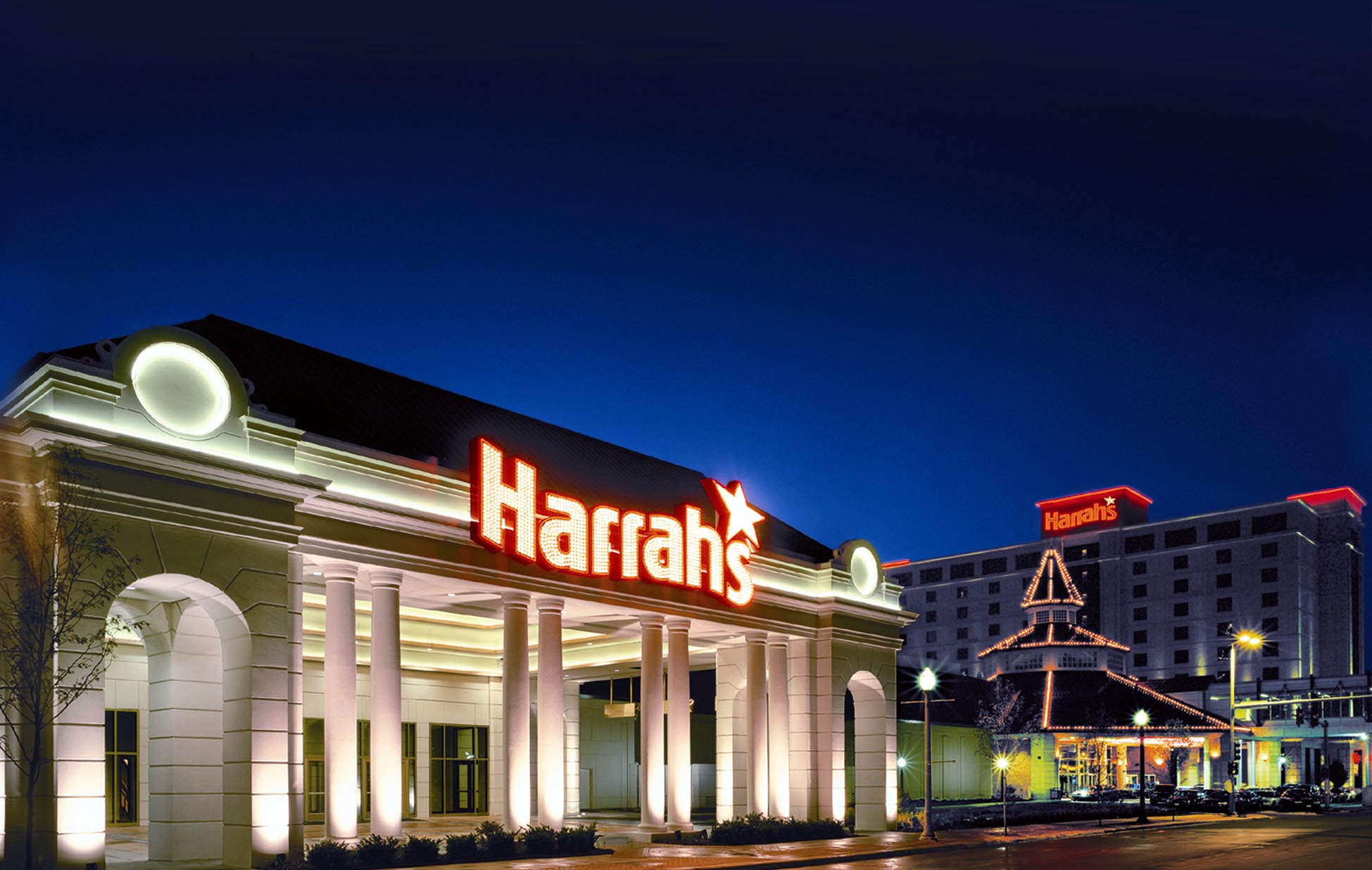
- Interactive map of Harrah's Joliet
- Location: Joliet, Illinois, United States; 151 N. Joliet Street
- Opened: May 4, 1993; 33 years ago
- Theme: Art Deco
- No. of rooms: 204
- Gaming space: 40,000 square feet (3,700 m^{2})
- Casino type: Riverboat
- Owner: Vici Properties (80%); John Q. Hammons (20%)
- Operating license holder: Caesars Entertainment
- Public transit access: Pace
- Website: caesars.com/harrahs-joliet

Harrah's Joliet is a riverboat casino in Joliet, Illinois, outside Chicago, operated by Caesars Entertainment. It has 1,138 slot machines, 204 hotel rooms, and 4 restaurants.

== History ==
The city began a downtown revitalization effort called Joliet City Center in 1990. The plan called for a greater emphasis on the Des Plaines riverfront, including the construction of a slip for riverboat gambling, which had been legalized by the state earlier that year. Early discussions were held between Joliet and Harrah's, operator of casinos in Nevada and Atlantic City, but it was Missouri hotel developer John Q. Hammons who moved forward and was awarded the gaming license. Hammons then brought Harrah's on board to operate the business and own an 80 percent share. Hammons' stake was initially to be financed by Harrah's, but this led to concern from the Illinois Gaming Board that Hammons was "selling" the license, so Hammons used his own money and outside funding sources instead.

Harrah's Joliet launched its first boat on May 4, 1993, a 210-foot yacht named the Northern Star, with 500 slot machines and 40 table games. A second vessel with a more traditional paddleboat look, the Southern Star, was added the following January.

A $29-million hotel was added in 1999, with 204 rooms on 11 floors.

After state law was changed to allow riverboat casinos to remain permanently docked, instead of cruising every two hours, Harrah's replaced its boats in 2001 with two joined barges, with 40,000 square feet of gaming space with 1,138 slot machines and 31 table games.

In October 2017, Caesars Entertainment (formerly Harrah's) transferred its 80 percent ownership stake in the property to Vici Properties as part of a corporate spin-off; Caesars continued to operate Harrah's Joliet under a lease agreement.

== See also ==
- List of Caesars Entertainment properties
- List of casinos in Illinois
