= Ari Taub (wrestler) =

Canadian Greco-Roman wrestler

Personal information
- Full name: Ari Michael Taub
- National team: Canada
- Born: January 19, 1971 (age 55) Montreal, Quebec, Canada
- Education: York University; Simon Fraser University; UBC Law School ('96)
- Occupation: Attorney
- Height: 191 cm (6 ft 3 in)
- Weight: 122 kg (269 lb)
- Children: 4

Sport
- Country: Canada
- Sport: Wrestling
- Weight class: Super-heavyweight
Medal record
Pan American Games
Bronze medal – third place	2007 Rio de Janeiro	Greco-Roman wrestling
Maccabiah Games
Gold medal – first place	1989 Israel	Freestyle Wrestling
Gold medal – first place	1989 Israel	Greco-Roman wrestling

Ari Michael Taub (born January 19, 1971) is a Canadian Olympic Greco-Roman wrestler. He won two gold medals at the 1989 Maccabiah Games in Israel, and a gold medal at the 2007 Commonwealth Wrestling Championship. He competed for Canada in the 2008 Summer Olympics.

== Biography ==
Taub was born in Montreal, Quebec, Canada, later lived in Vancouver, and is Jewish. He grew up in Calgary, Alberta, Canada, and went to Henry Wise Wood High School. His height is 191 cm (6 ft 3 in), and he weighs 122 kg (269 lb). He attended York University and Simon Fraser University (BBA, Finance '94) and UBC Law School ('96), and is an attorney. After law school he articled for a year at Ladner Downs in Vancouver.

He is married to the former Sarah Howell, and his four children are two sets of identical twins, the elder two being girls and the younger two being boys. The two boys, Conaire and Nick Taub, are volleyball players and were flag bearers as well as competitors for the Team Canada under-18 men's team at the 2022 Maccabiah Games; they also competed at the 2017 Maccabiah Games. He resides in Calgary, where he runs his own law firm, specializing in corporate and real-estate law, Taub Law.

== Career ==
At the World Wrestling Championships, he came in 5th in Freestyle Cadets at 95 kg in 1987, and 5th in Freestyle Espoir in 1991.

At the 1989 Maccabiah Games in Israel, he won two gold medals. In the Pan American Wrestling Championships, he won a silver medal in 1992, and bronze medals in 2006 and 2007.

He quit wrestling in 1992, when he was 22 years old, for 10 years, after a diagnosis of osteophytes (bone spurs) and a spinal column injury involving a narrowing of the spinal canal, which could turn him into a quadriplegic if he continued wrestling. But he returned a decade later upon learning that it had been a misdiagnosis. In 2000, he had chronic fatigue syndrome.

In 2004 he won the Canadian Greco-Roman championship. He won a bronze medal at the 2007 Pan American Games, and a gold medal at the 2007 Commonwealth Wrestling Championship.

Taub qualified for and then competed in the 2008 Summer Olympics in Beijing, China, in the 120 kg weight class, at 37 years of age. In the 1/8 finals, he was defeated by Mihály Deák-Bárdos of Hungary, and finished 16th. He was Canada's first Olympic Greco-Roman wrestler since 1996.

Taub and a partner created Calgary's only amateur MMA fight TV and live event series, Hard Knocks Fighting Championship, in March 2009. He is the founder and CEO of Hard Knocks Fighting network.
