= Harrah's North Kansas City =

- Interactive map of Harrah's North Kansas City
- Location: North Kansas City, Missouri, U.S.; 1 Riverboat Drive; 39.148548°N 94.535371°W
- Opened: September 22, 1994; 31 years ago
- Theme: Carnival
- No. of rooms: 392
- Gaming space: 60,100 sq ft (5,580 m^{2})
- Casino type: Riverboat
- Owner: Vici Properties
- Operating license holder: Caesars Entertainment
- Website: caesars.com/harrahs-kansas-city

Harrah's North Kansas City is a hotel and casino in North Kansas City, Missouri. Located just north of Kansas City on the Missouri River, it has more than 1,800 slot machines, table games, and video games, and six restaurants.

== History ==
The hotel opened just north of Kansas City on the Missouri River as a carnival-themed riverboat casino.

Winning Streaks opened as a $1.4 million sports bar in Harrah's North Kansas City Hotel and Casino in January 2017. It referenced the name of the sports bar in the casino when it had opened - however, that space had later been occupied by I Love This Bar & Grill by Toby Keith, and then the 810 Zone, which closed in 2016.

In June 2019, Eldorado Resorts Inc. agreed to acquire Caesars Entertainment Corp., and 60 properties including Harrah's North Kansas City transferred over to new ownership. The casino at the time employed around 800 people. Regulators approved the purchase in June 2020, with Eldorado becoming new owner of Harrah's North Kansas City while selling its Isle of Capri Casino Kansas City casino. At that time, the Missouri Gaming Commission numbers showed that "Harrah’s North Kansas City was the second-highest-grossing casino on the Missouri side of the metro area in February. The casino had admissions of 290,500 and total adjusted gross revenue of $15.3 million."

Gordon Ramsay Steak by Gordon Ramsay opened in November 2019 in the casino. The new restaurant location in Kansas City was part of Ramsay's "cooperation with Caesars Entertainment, which started in 2012." Ramsay was present at the opening night of the eponymous steakhouse in November 2019, as his fourth American restaurant by that name. Themes included United Kingdom dishes, like "Beef Wellington" and "sticky toffee pudding." Otherwise, the menu was seasonal with some inspired Kansas City menu items.

== Features ==
It had, at one point, 1,800 slot machines, table games, and video games, and six restaurants.

== See also ==
- List of casinos in Missouri
