= Century Casinos =

Gambling company

Century Casinos, Inc.
- Traded as: Nasdaq: CNTY; Russell 2000 Component
- Industry: Gaming
- Founded: 1992; 34 years ago
- Headquarters: Colorado Springs, Colorado, United States
- Revenue: $573 million (2025)
- Operating income: $51 million (2025)
- Net income: −$54 million (2025)
- Total assets: $1.1 billion (2025)
- Total equity: −$7 million (2025)
- Number of employees: 3,756 (2025)
- Website: cnty.com

Century Casinos, Inc. is a gambling company based in Colorado Springs, Colorado.

The company operates nine casinos in Colorado, Maryland, Missouri, Nevada, West Virginia, and Alberta. It also operates casinos on four cruise ships for TUI Cruises. It owns a 67 percent share in Casinos Poland, which owns and operates seven casinos in Poland.

== History ==
Century Casinos was formed in 1992 by several executives of Casinos Austria.

In early 1993, the company signed on to manage a proposed riverboat casino in St. Charles Parish, Louisiana. The proposal was blocked, however, by parish officials. The casino's developer bought out Century's management agreement in 1995 for $4 million, and relocated the project, which eventually opened as Isle of Capri Casino Lake Charles.

In Indiana, which had recently legalized riverboat casinos, Century revealed two proposals in September 1993: one casino to be built in Gary in partnership with local investors, and another to be built in Vevay. Within months, the company dropped its plans for Gary, to focus on the Vevay project. Hospitality Franchise Systems (HFS) joined the project as a joint venture partner in 1994. In 1995, with the license application, still pending, Century and HFS sold the Vevay project to a partnership between Boomtown and Hilton. The project ultimately opened in 2000 as Belterra Casino, and Century received a total of $2.9 million for the sale.

Century merged in March 1994 with Alpine Gaming, parent company of the Long Branch Saloon & Casino in Cripple Creek, Colorado. The casino was then renamed as Legends. Century then purchased the adjacent Womack's Saloon & Gaming Parlor in 1996 for $13.5 million. The combined property would take on the Century Casino name in 2010.

Century's cruise ship casino business began in April 1994, when it began operating the casino on the Silver Cloud under a concession agreement with Silversea Cruises.

In November 1994, the company submitted an application to build a casino in Portage des Sioux, Missouri. The application languished amid an informal moratorium on the issuance of new gaming licenses by the Missouri Gaming Commission. Century's development agreement with the city eventually expired.

In January 1995, Century opened the Legends Casino at the Soboba Reservation, a tribal-owned bingo parlor and cardroom in Southern California. The company pulled out of its management agreement for the facility seven months later.

In August 1995, the company proposed to build a casino in Alexandria, Louisiana. The Louisiana Riverboat Gaming Commission, however, did not award the one available casino license to Century, instead selecting the application for Horseshoe Bossier City.

In November 1995, Century signed a $1.1-million deal to manage a casino planned for the Greek island of Rhodes, being developed by a consortium including Playboy Enterprises. The company turned over its duties to Playboy before the casino opened.

Century moved its headquarters from Denver to Colorado Springs in 1996, to be closer to its casino properties in Cripple Creek.

The company announced an agreement in 1998 to manage and co-own a casino to be built in a Marriott hotel in Prague. The Millennium Casino opened the following year.

In 2000, Century was awarded a license for a casino in Caledon, South Africa, which it would manage and co-own. The Caledon Casino, Hotel & Spa opened later that year. In 2001, Century agreed to co-develop another casino in South Africa, to be built in the province of Gauteng.

In 2006, the company opened a Century Casino & Hotel in Central City, Colorado and another property by the same name in Edmonton, Alberta. Century also shuffled its holdings in South Africa, acquiring a majority stake in the Monte Vista Casino in Newcastle (subsequently renamed as Century Casino Newcastle) and selling its interest in the Gauteng casino project.

In 2007, the company paid $8.7 million to acquire a 33 percent stake in Casinos Poland. Century increased its stake to 67 percent in April 2013.

In 2009, Century sold its casinos in Prague and South Africa.

Century assumed the management of a casino at a Radisson hotel in Aruba (later a Hilton) in 2010. The management agreement ended in 2017.

Century purchased the Silver Dollar Casino in Calgary, Alberta in 2010 for $10.5 million, and then rebranded it as Century Casino Calgary. Next, the company financed the development of the Century Downs Racetrack and Casino near Calgary, which it also managed from its opening in 2015. In October 2016, Century acquired the Apex Casino in St. Albert for $12.3 million, and then renamed it as Century Casino St. Albert. The expansion in Alberta continued in April 2019, when the company opened the Century Mile Racetrack and Casino in the Edmonton area.

The company made moves to expand into two new markets in 2017. In England, it purchased a small casino being developed in the city of Bath. In Bermuda, it signed on to manage a planned casino at the Hamilton Princess hotel. The Bath casino opened in May 2018. It closed in 2020 because of poor financial results and changes in British casino regulations.

In 2019, Century bought the operating businesses of three casinos in Missouri and West Virginia from Eldorado Resorts for $107 million. Vici Properties acquired the real estate of the casinos (Isle Casino Cape Girardeau, Lady Luck Casino Caruthersville, and Mountaineer Casino, Racetrack and Resort) at the same time, and leased them to Century for $25 million per year. The acquisition more than doubled Century's annual revenue. The Isle and Lady Luck casinos were then rebranded under the Century name.

In 2020, Century sold the Century Casino Calgary to SM2 Capital Partners.

In 2021, Century partnered with British online sports gambling company Bet365 to launch sports betting operations in Colorado.

In 2023, Century purchased the operating businesses of two casinos. In Northern Nevada, it acquired the Nugget Casino Resort from Marnell Gaming, In Maryland, it bought the Rocky Gap Casino Resort from Golden Entertainment for $56 million. Meanwhile, it sold the real estate of its four casinos in Alberta to Vici Properties in a leaseback deal for US$162 million. The operating business of the two Alberta racetrack casinos was sold in 2026 to Highfield Investment Group for $16 million.

== List of properties ==
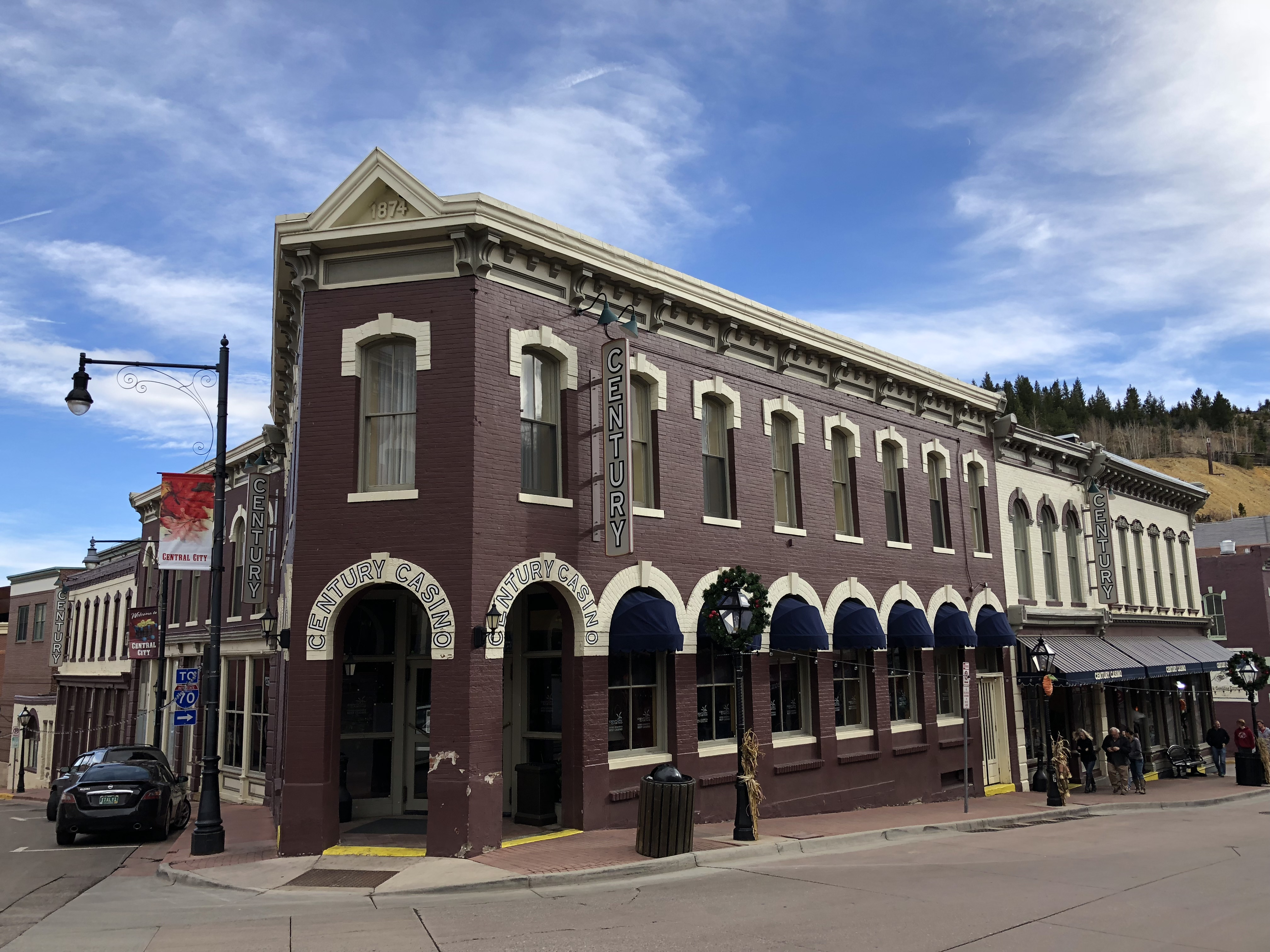
Century Casino Central City

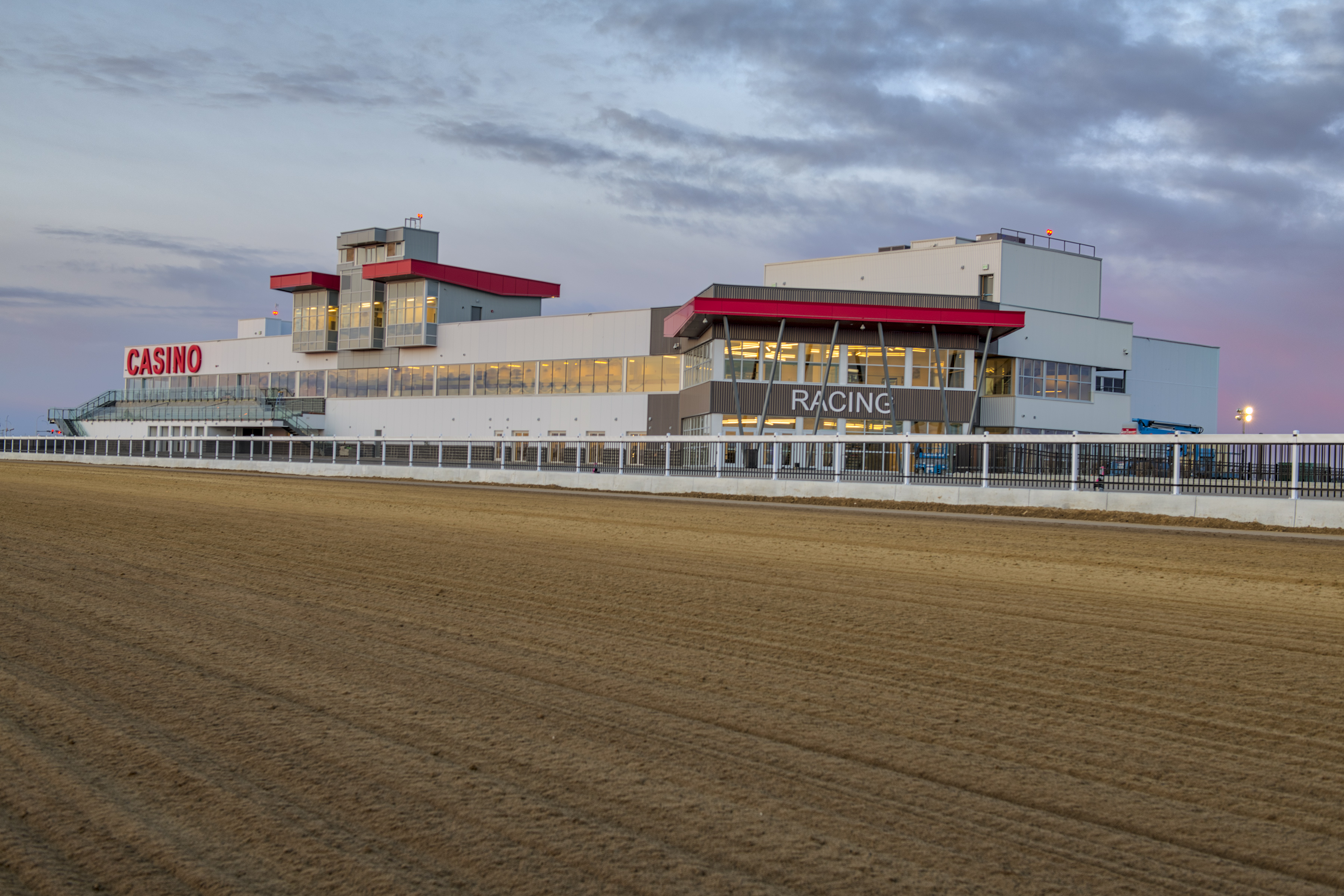
Century Mile Racetrack and Casino

- Century Casino Cape Girardeau — Cape Girardeau, Missouri (leased from Vici Properties)
- Century Casino Caruthersville — Caruthersville, Missouri (leased from Vici Properties)
- Century Casino Central City — Central City, Colorado
- Century Casino Cripple Creek — Cripple Creek, Colorado
- Century Casino Edmonton — Edmonton, Alberta (leased from Vici Properties)
- Century Casino St. Albert — St. Albert, Alberta (leased from Vici Properties)
- Mountaineer Casino, Racetrack and Resort — New Cumberland, West Virginia (leased from Vici Properties)
- Nugget Casino Resort — Sparks, Nevada (50% real estate ownership, 100% business ownership)
- Rocky Gap Casino Resort — Flintstone, Maryland (leased from Vici Properties)

=== Former properties ===
Properties previously owned, operated, or managed by the company include:

- Caledon Hotel, Spa & Casino — Caledon, South Africa
- Century Casino Bath — Bath, England
- Century Casino Calgary — Calgary, Alberta
- Century Casino Millennium — Prague, Czech Republic
- Century Casino Newcastle — Newcastle, South Africa (60% stake)
- Century Downs Racetrack and Casino — Balzac, Alberta
- Century Mile Racetrack and Casino — Edmonton International Airport, Leduc County, Alberta
- Hilton Aruba Caribbean Resort & Casino — Noord, Aruba (casino only)
- Legends Casino at Soboba — San Jacinto, California
