= Horseshoe Bossier City =

Louisiana gambling casino

Horseshoe Casino Hotel Bossier City
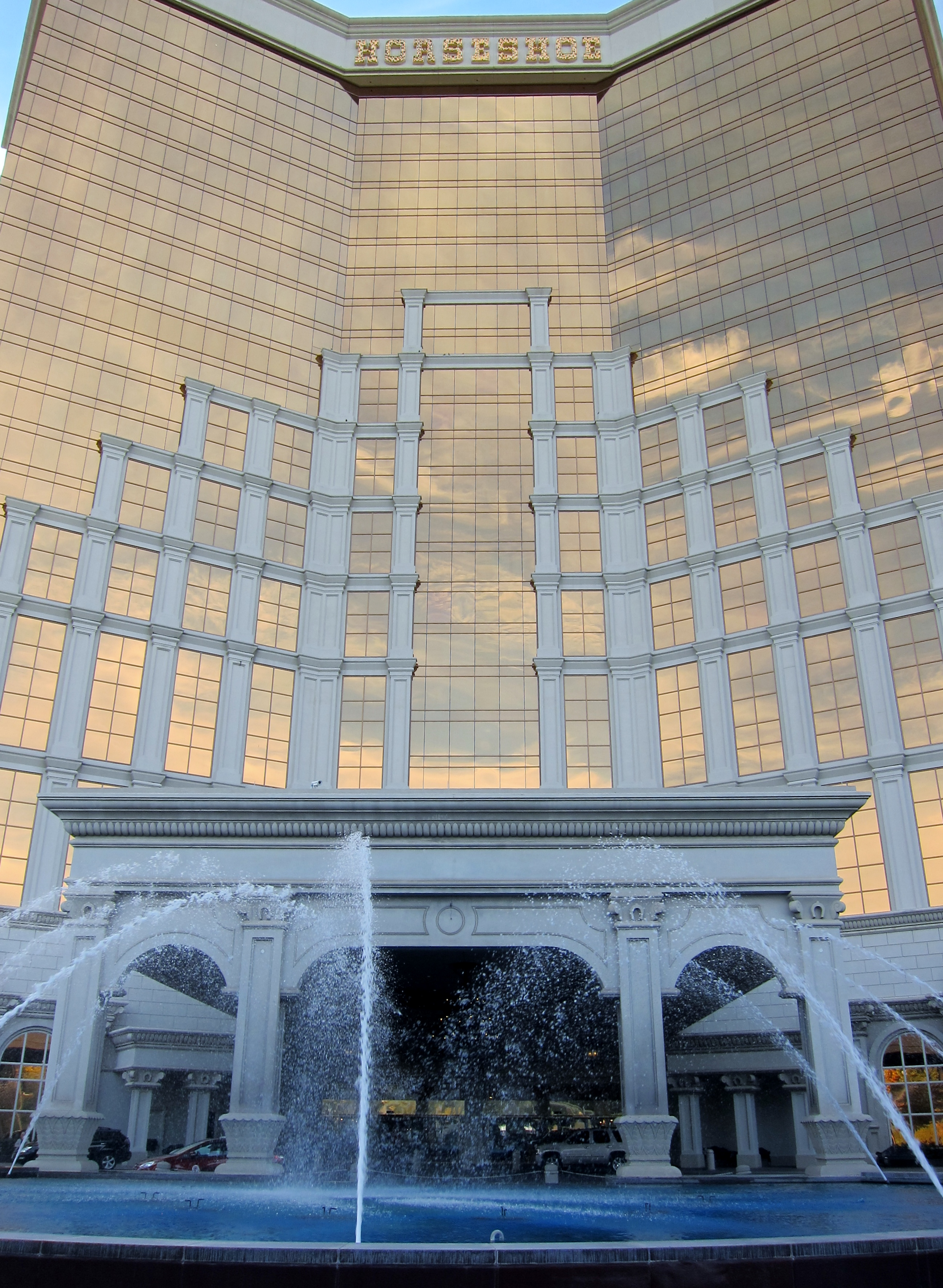
- Interactive map of Horseshoe Casino Hotel Bossier City
- Location: Bossier City, Louisiana; 711 Horseshoe Boulevard; 32.515438°N 93.737054°W
- Opened: 1994
- Theme: Western
- No. of rooms: 606
- Signature attractions: 1931 Lounge
- Notable restaurants: Jack Binion's Steak House; 8oz Burger Bar; Jasmine's Noodle Bar
- Casino type: Riverboat
- Owner: Vici Properties
- Operating license holder: Caesars Entertainment
- Website: caesars.com/horseshoe-bossier-city

Horseshoe Bossier City is a riverboat casino in Bossier City, Louisiana, across the river from Shreveport. Horseshoe Bossier City has 606 suites in its 25-story hotel tower. Horseshoe has over 1,500 slot machines and over 60 table games. Horseshoe has over 200 video poker machines, and a 14-table poker room. The casino is owned by Vici Properties and operated by Caesars Entertainment.

In October 2017, ownership of the property was transferred to Vici Properties as part of a corporate spin-off, and it was leased back to Caesars.

== Negative effects of the COVID economy ==
For more than a decade, legal gambling has not been a growing industry in Louisiana. Tribal casinos in Oklahoma have drawn a substantial share of gamblers away from Shreveport/Bossier City which was once the leading market for Louisiana. In 2019, the steady declines due to the COVID outbreak have raised grave concerns over the future of a business sector considered crucial to the state's budget. In 2020, Horseshoe laid-off full and part-time employees, primarily in food services. Their once popular and notably expansive buffet has been permanently closed. Severance packages through the end of the year were offered to furloughed and full-time staff. As one of the few remaining casinos in Bossier City, Horseshoe had the highest percentage-decrease in income in August 2020, at 43.7 percent compared to the previous year's earnings. In June 2018, all but one of the state's casinos experienced declines in revenue based on prior year's figures, except for Bossier City's Margaritaville Resort Casino, which experienced a 0.6 percent increase. All others were down by at least 10 percent in a year over year comparison, including the markets in Baton Rouge, Lake Charles and Shreveport/Bossier City.

In September 2019, the Shreveport Times obtained information from the Louisiana Department of Health's food safety inspection, and published their list of the Top 10 food establishments with the most critical violations. Several of the restaurants and bars inside the Horseshoe received violations, some of which were critical, causing the Horseshoe to rank #1 in critical violations:

- Village Square: 24 violations, 7 critical
- Boat Bar 1: 6 violations, 3 critical
- Four Winds: 7 violations, 2 critical
- Boat Bar 3: 6 violations, 2 critical
- Jasmine's Noodle: 5 violations, 2 critical
- Boat Bar 6: 7 violations, 1 critical
- Boat Bar 4: 6 violations, 1 critical
- Boat Bar 5: 4 violations, 1 critical
- Boat Bar 2: 1 violation, 1 critical

A total of 66 violations, 20 rated as critical, most were corrected on site.

On March 16, 2020, as part of his efforts to limit the number of people at gatherings to fewer than 50 and slow the spread of Coronavirus, Louisiana Governor John B. Edwards ordered the closure of all casinos until April 13, 2020. As a result, Horseshoe casino donated extra food to schools in Bossier Parish. The food the school system didn't use was picked-up by the Louisiana Food Bank.

== See also ==
- List of Caesars Entertainment properties
- List of casinos in Louisiana
