= Caesars Entertainment =

American gaming company

Caesars Entertainment, Inc.
- Formerly: Eldorado Resorts, Inc. (1996–2020)
- Type: Public
- Traded as: Nasdaq: CZR; S&P 600 component
- Industry: Gambling; hospitality
- Founded: 1996; 30 years ago
- Headquarters: Reno, Nevada, U.S.
- Area served: United States
- Key people: Gary Carano (executive chairman); Thomas Reeg (CEO); Anthony Carano; (president and COO)
- Products: Hotels; Casinos
- Brands: Caesars; Eldorado; Harrah's; Horseshoe; Tropicana
- Revenue: ▼US$11.2 billion (2024)
- Net income: ▼US$−211 million (2024)
- Total assets: ▼US$32.6 billion (2024)
- Total equity: ▼US$4.38 billion (2024)
- Number of employees: 50,000 (2024)
- Website: caesars.com

Caesars Entertainment, Inc., formerly Eldorado Resorts, Inc., is an American hotel and casino entertainment company founded and based in Reno, Nevada, that operates more than 50 properties. Eldorado Resorts acquired Caesars Entertainment Corporation and changed its own name to Caesars Entertainment on July 20, 2020.

== History ==
Eldorado Resorts logo (2014–2020)

=== 1973–2000 ===
The company traces its history back to the development of the Eldorado Hotel in Reno, which was opened in May 1973, by a group of investors that included Don Carano and other members of the Carano family.

In July 1995, the Eldorado opened the adjacent Silver Legacy Resort Casino in partnership with Circus Circus Enterprises.

The Eldorado companies were reorganized in 1996 as Eldorado Resorts LLC in connection with a $100 million bond offering.

=== 2000–2020 ===
In 2005, the company took over the bankrupt Hollywood Casino Shreveport in Louisiana, buying a 76 percent stake in the property for $154 million. It was then rebranded as the Eldorado Casino Shreveport.

In 2013, Eldorado agreed to combine with the publicly traded MTR Gaming Group in a reverse merger. The merger would add three racinos in Ohio, Pennsylvania, and West Virginia to Eldorado's portfolio. The transaction closed on September 19, 2014, creating Eldorado Resorts Inc. in its present form. Eldorado's existing owners held 50.2 percent of the combined company, and Gary Carano was appointed as its chairman and CEO.

In November 2015, Eldorado bought Circus Circus Reno and the 50% stake in the Silver Legacy that it did not already own from MGM Resorts International for $73 million.

In May 2017, Eldorado acquired Isle of Capri Casinos for $1.7 billion in cash, stock, and assumed debt, adding twelve casinos to its holdings.

In August 2018, Eldorado bought the Grand Victoria Casino in Illinois for $328 million. Two months later, Eldorado acquired the operating business of Tropicana Entertainment for $640 million, adding seven casinos to its portfolio. Gaming and Leisure Properties simultaneously purchased the real estate of five of the casinos and leased them to Eldorado for a total of $88 million per year. Additionally, Eldorado paid $246 million for the real estate underlying Tropicana's Lumière Place casino in Missouri.

In early 2019, Eldorado sold Presque Isle Downs and the operations of Lady Luck Casino Nemacolin to Churchill Downs, Inc. for a total of $179 million.

In March 2019, it was reported that Eldorado was discussing a merger with Caesars Entertainment. In June 2019, Caesars accepted Eldorado's offer to purchase Caesars for $18 billion in stock and cash. Eldorado operated 26 assets compared to Caesars, which controlled 53. Eldorado would change its name to Caesars Entertainment after the completion of the acquisition, and the companies' loyalty programs would be combined under the Caesars Rewards brand. Eldorado's key executives would be retained. The deal was expected to be completed in the middle of 2020.

=== Since 2020 ===
With the Caesars acquisition pending, Eldorado sold three properties (Lady Luck Casino Caruthersville, Mountaineer Casino Racetrack and Resort and Isle Casino Cape Girardeau) to Vici Properties and Century Casinos for a total of $385 million, with Vici acquiring the real estate assets and Century acquiring the operating businesses. Eldorado also sold Lady Luck Casino Vicksburg and Isle of Capri Casino Kansas City to Twin River Worldwide Holdings for $230 million. The deals were intended to reduce Eldorado's debt level and avert potential antitrust issues in Missouri, where Eldorado and Caesars together owned 6 of the state's 13 casinos.

In April 2020, Eldorado agreed to sell Eldorado Shreveport and the MontBleu casino in Lake Tahoe to Twin River.

In June 2020, the Federal Trade Commission approved Eldorado's acquisition of Caesars. The transaction was completed on July 20 for $8.5 billion in cash and stock.

In April 2021, the company acquired the sports betting company William Hill for $3.7 billion. Most of William Hill's offerings in the U.S. would be rebranded as Caesars Sportsbook. In September 2021, Caesars agreed to sell William Hill's European business to 888 Holdings for $3 billion.

In Indiana, the company was required to sell three of its properties as a condition of approval of the Caesars merger. In 2021, the operating businesses of Tropicana Evansville and Caesars Southern Indiana were sold to Bally's Corporation (the former Twin River Worldwide Holdings) and the Eastern Band of Cherokee Indians, respectively, for a total of $390 million.

In July 2021, Caesars sold its casinos in Europe and Africa (the former London Clubs International) to an affiliate of Silver Point Capital.

In February 2022, Caesars announced a multi-year deal which named the organization as the official sportsbook partner of the NBA's Cleveland Cavaliers. The company opened a 10,355 square foot retail sportsbook at Rocket Mortgage FieldHouse, the home of the Cavaliers. In November 2022, Caesars was added to the list of "Best Employers for Veterans" by Forbes.

In August 2023, ESPN announced a new agreement with rival Penn Entertainment to launch a branded sportsbook business under the ESPN Bet branding. This triggered an escape clause in Caesars' existing partnership with ESPN.

In September 2023, Scattered Spider (also known as UNC3944) breached Caesars data through an outside IT vendor via ransomware, and demanded $30 million in ransom. Caesars Entertainment paid half, $15 million. The cyberhacking group was able to access driver's license numbers and possibly Social Security numbers, for a "significant number" of Caesars customers. While casino and hotel computer operations were unaffected, Caesars was unable to guarantee the security of the personal information of its 65 million loyalty rewards members. Hotel and casino loyalty rewards records may include those of Caesars Palace, The Cromwell, The Flamingo, The Horseshoe, The LINQ Hotel & Casino, Paris Las Vegas, Planet Hollywood Resort & Casino, Harrah's Las Vegas, and the Rio All-Suite Hotel & Casino. The same cyberattack group targeted the MGM Grand Las Vegas later that month. Two class-action lawsuits for failing to protect private data were filed against Caesars on September 21, 2023, with a third lawsuit filed on the following day. Arrests in the case have been made, both locally and internationally, during 2024−2025. Hackers Scattered Spider later formed a cybercrime collective with ShinyHunters and Lapsus$ in 2025.

In June 2024, Caesars acquired WynnBet's Michigan iGaming operations. This acquisition from Wynn Resort includes a long-term extension for market access rights with the Sault Ste. Marie Tribe of Chippewa Indians. Caesars will continue using the WynnBet brand initially but plans to transition to its own platform in late 2024. The acquisition supports Caesars' growth in the iGaming sector and reinforces its commitment to regulated markets. Additionally, Caesars Sportsbook has launched in North Carolina on the lands of the Eastern Band of Cherokee Indians.

In August 2024, Caesars announced the sale of the World Series of Poker brand to NSUS Group inc, the operator behind online poker site GGPoker for $500 million, $250 million in cash and $250 million to be paid in 5 years. As a part of this deal, Caesars secured the right from NSUS to continue hosting the WSOP's flagship live tournament series at its Las Vegas casinos for the next 20 years.

Caesars was one of multiple bidders attempting to open a casino in New York City with their proposed Caesar's Palace Times Square proposal. The casino at Times Square would have had nearly 1,000 guest rooms. Due to opposition, the proposed development was rejected by the community advisory committee in September 2025.

Caesars was removed from the S&P 500 in September 2025, as its market capitalization fell below the inclusion threshold. As of November 2025, it was listed in the S&P SmallCap 600.

In March 2026, Fertitta Entertainment entered negotiations to acquire the company for about $7 billion, reportedly topping a current offer by Icahn Enterprises. A year prior, Caesar's had agreed to expand the size of its board to 12 directors, adding Icahn's general counsel and CFO. On May 28, 2026, Fertitta Entertainment announced it would be acquiring Caesars Entertainment for $5.7 billion and take on close to $12 billion in debt from Caesars, putting the total value of the deal at about $17.6 billion.

In July 2026, Carl Icahn was reportedly preparing a new $33 per share takeover bid of Caesars Entertainment, which would make their offer more attractive than Fertitta Entertainment's $31 per share bid.

== List of properties ==
The properties owned and operated by Caesars Entertainment are:

=== Western United States ===
- Caesars Republic Sonoma County- (Geyserville, California)
- Circus Circus Reno – Reno, Nevada
- Eldorado Resort Casino – Reno, Nevada
- Harrah's Ak-Chin – Maricopa, Arizona §
- Harrah's Lake Tahoe – Stateline, Nevada §
- Harrah's Laughlin – Laughlin, Nevada §
- Harrah's Northern California- (Ione, California)
- Harrah's Southern California – Valley Center, California §
- Caesars Republic Lake Tahoe – Stateline, Nevada §
- Horseshoe Black Hawk – Black Hawk, Colorado
- Lady Luck Casino Black Hawk – Black Hawk, Colorado
- Silver Legacy Resort & Casino – Reno, Nevada
- Tropicana Laughlin – Laughlin, Nevada §

==== Las Vegas Strip ====
- Caesars Forum – Paradise, Nevada §
- Caesars Palace – Paradise, Nevada §
- Flamingo Las Vegas – Paradise, Nevada
- Harrah's Las Vegas – Paradise, Nevada §
- Horseshoe Las Vegas – Paradise, Nevada
- The Linq – Paradise, Nevada
- Paris Las Vegas – Paradise, Nevada
- Planet Hollywood Las Vegas – Paradise, Nevada
- The Vanderpump Hotel Las Vegas – Paradise, Nevada

=== Midwest ===
- Caesars Windsor – Windsor, Ontario §
- Eldorado Gaming Scioto Downs – Columbus, Ohio
- Grand Victoria Casino Elgin – Elgin, Illinois
- Isle Casino Hotel Bettendorf – Bettendorf, Iowa
- Isle Casino Hotel Waterloo – Waterloo, Iowa
- Harrah's Council Bluffs – Council Bluffs, Iowa §
- Harrah's Hoosier Park – Anderson, Indiana
- Harrah's Joliet – Joliet, Illinois §
- Harrah's Metropolis – Metropolis, Illinois §
- Harrah's North Kansas City – North Kansas City, Missouri §
- Horseshoe Council Bluffs – Council Bluffs, Iowa §
- Horseshoe Hammond – Hammond, Indiana §
- Horseshoe Indianapolis – Shelbyville, Indiana
- Horseshoe St. Louis – St. Louis, Missouri §

=== South ===
- Caesars New Orleans – New Orleans, Louisiana §
- Harrah's Gulf Coast – Biloxi, Mississippi §
- Harrah's Oklahoma- (Chandler, Oklahoma)
- Harrah's Pompano Beach – Pompano Beach, Florida
- Horseshoe Bossier City – Bossier City, Louisiana §
- Horseshoe Lake Charles – Lake Charles, Louisiana
- Horseshoe Tunica – Robinsonville, Mississippi §
- Isle of Capri Casino Hotel Boonville – Boonville, Missouri
- Isle of Capri Casino Hotel Lula – Lula, Mississippi
- Trop Casino Greenville – Greenville, Mississippi §

=== Atlantic ===
- Caesars Atlantic City – Atlantic City, New Jersey §
- Caesars Virginia – Danville, Virginia
- Harrah's Atlantic City – Atlantic City, New Jersey §
- Harrah's Cherokee – Cherokee, North Carolina §
- Harrah's Cherokee Valley River – Murphy, North Carolina §
- Harrah's Philadelphia – Chester, Pennsylvania §
- Horseshoe Baltimore – Baltimore, Maryland (50% interest)
- Tropicana Atlantic City – Atlantic City, New Jersey §

§ Properties are operated by the company under a lease or a management agreement.

=== Former properties ===
- Bally's Atlantic City – Atlantic City, New Jersey
- Belle of Baton Rouge – Baton Rouge, Louisiana
- Caesars Southern Indiana – Elizabeth, Indiana
- Eldorado Shreveport – Shreveport, Louisiana
- Harrah's Louisiana Downs – Bossier City, Louisiana
- Isle Casino Cape Girardeau – Cape Girardeau, Missouri
- Isle of Capri Casino Kansas City – Kansas City, Missouri
- Lady Luck Casino Caruthersville – Caruthersville, Missouri
- Lady Luck Casino Nemacolin – Farmington, Pennsylvania
- Lady Luck Casino Vicksburg – Vicksburg, Mississippi
- London Clubs International (12 casinos in the United Kingdom, Egypt, and South Africa)
- MontBleu Casino Resort – Stateline, Nevada
- Mountaineer Casino Racetrack & Resort – Chester, West Virginia
- Presque Isle Downs & Casino – Summit Township, Pennsylvania
- Rio All Suite Hotel and Casino – Paradise, Nevada
- Tropicana Evansville – Evansville, Indiana

== See also ==
- List of integrated resorts
- List of casino hotels
