= Isle of Capri Boonville =

Stationary boat hotel and casino on the Missouri River in Boonville, Missouri

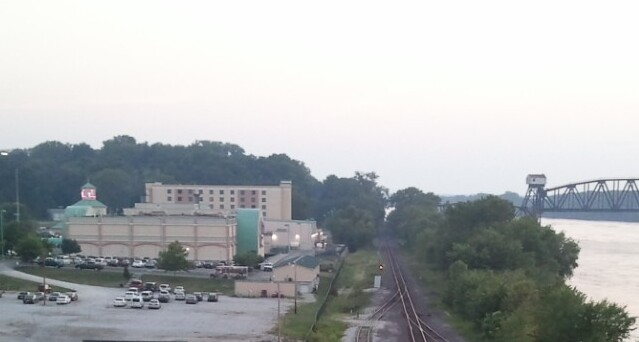
- Casino next to the Missouri River
- Interactive map of Isle of Capri Boonville
- Location: Boonville, Missouri; 100 Isle of Capri Blvd; 38°58′33″N 92°45′04″W
- Opened: December 6, 2001
- No. of rooms: 140
- Gaming space: 28,000 sq ft (2,600 m^{2})
- Casino type: Riverboat
- Owner: Caesars Entertainment
- Website: IsleofCapriBoonville.com

The Isle of Capri Casino and Hotel Boonville is a stationary boat hotel and casino on the Missouri River in Boonville, Missouri, owned and operated by Caesars Entertainment.

== History ==
The Isle of Capri Boonville opened on December 6, 2001, and was operated by Isle of Capri Casinos, Inc. In 2017, Isle of Capri Casinos was acquired by Eldorado Resorts (later named Caesars Entertainment).

== Property information ==
The casino has around 600 gaming machines and 15 table games. The Isle of Capri Boonville also features two restaurants and a 140-room hotel, including 26 junior suites. A casino floor remodel was completed in September 2013 and included new carpet, additional TVs in the bar and table games area, a redesigned casino bar, and a redesigned cashier's cage.

Slot selection includes penny, quarter, half-dollar, dollar, two dollar, five dollar, ten dollar, and twenty-five dollar denomination slots in a range of styles (classic reel slots, video slots, video reel slots, etc.). The casino also features video poker games, including progressive games.

The casino's table game selection features: blackjack, craps, double-deck blackjack, 21+3 Extreme, Criss-Cross Poker, Cajun Stud, High Card Flush, and EZ-Baccarat.

The casino also hosts events, concerts, and conventions in their 12,000 square feet of meeting and banquet space. Weddings, head line act concerts, and trade shows are just a few that have been held there.
