= Vici Properties =

Real estate investment trust

Vici Properties Inc.
- Type: Public
- Traded as: NYSE: VICI; S&P 500 component
- ISIN: US9256521090
- Industry: Real estate investment trust
- Founded: October 6, 2017; 9 years ago in Paradise, Nevada, U.S.
- Headquarters: New York City, U.S.
- Key people: Edward B. Pitoniak (CEO)
- Revenue: ▲US$4.01 billion (2025)
- Net income: ▲US$2.78 billion (2025)
- Total assets: ▲US$46.7 billion (2025)
- Total equity: ▲US$27.8 billion (2025)
- Number of employees: 27 (2024)
- Website: viciproperties.com

Vici Properties Inc. is an American real estate investment trust (REIT) specializing in casino and entertainment properties, based in New York City. It was formed in 2017 as a spin-off from Caesars Entertainment Corporation as part of its bankruptcy reorganization. It owns 64 casinos, hotels, and racetracks, four golf courses, and 38 bowling alleys around the United States and Canada.

== History ==
Vici Properties was formed as part of the Chapter 11 bankruptcy reorganization of Caesars Entertainment Operating Company (CEOC), the largest division of Caesars Entertainment. After placing CEOC into bankruptcy in January 2015, Caesars proposed splitting CEOC into two companies: a REIT, which would own the company's casinos, and an operating company, which would manage them. The plan was designed to maximize value for CEOC's creditors by taking advantage of favorable tax treatment for REITs. Several members of Congress opposed the plan, calling it an abuse of the REIT laws. They asked the Internal Revenue Service to deny tax-free status to the spin-off, but their protest went unheeded.

The spin-off of Vici to CEOC's creditors was completed on October 6, 2017, the day that CEOC emerged from bankruptcy. Vici began with a portfolio of nineteen casinos and racetracks, all leased to Caesars at a total initial annual rent of $630 million, and four golf courses. The company's name was adopted from the phrase "Veni, vidi, vici", commonly attributed to Julius Caesar; vici in Latin means "I conquered".

Vici acquired Harrah's Las Vegas from Caesars in December 2017 for $1.1 billion, and leased it back at an initial annual rent of $87.4 million.

MGM Growth Properties, a REIT affiliated with Caesars competitor MGM Resorts International, offered in January 2018 to acquire Vici for an estimated $5.9 billion. Vici's board rejected the offer, deciding instead to proceed with a planned initial public offering. Vici completed its IPO on the New York Stock Exchange in February 2018, raising $1.2 billion.

The company moved its headquarters to New York City from the Las Vegas area in mid-2018.

Vici completed two transactions with Caesars in 2018, purchasing the Octavius Tower at Caesars Palace for $508 million and Harrah's Philadelphia for $242 million, and leasing them back to Caesars for $35 million and $21 million per year, respectively.

In 2019, Vici made two purchases in conjunction with Penn National Gaming. Vici bought the real estate of the Margaritaville Resort Casino in Louisiana and Greektown Casino–Hotel in Detroit for $261 million and $700 million, respectively, while Penn bought both properties' operating businesses and leased them from Vici for annual rent of $23 million and $56 million, respectively. Vici bought a second casino from Greektown seller Jack Entertainment, Jack Cincinnati Casino, in September 2019, paying $558 million for the real estate; Hard Rock International leased the property for $43 million per year.

In December 2019, Vici bought three casinos in Missouri and West Virginia from Eldorado Resorts in conjunction with Century Casinos: Isle Casino Cape Girardeau, Lady Luck Casino Caruthersville, and Mountaineer Casino, Racetrack and Resort. Vici paid $278 million for the real estate assets, and leased them to Century for $25 million per year. A month later, the company bought two more properties from Jack Entertainment, Jack Cleveland Casino and Jack Thistledown Racino, for a total of $843 million, leasing them back for $66 million per year.

In July 2020, Eldorado Resorts acquired Caesars Entertainment, becoming Vici's primary tenant, and renamed itself to Caesars Entertainment. In connection with this acquisition, Vici bought three properties (Harrah's Atlantic City, Harrah's Laughlin, and Harrah's New Orleans) from Caesars for a total of $1.8 billion, and leased them back to the new Caesars for $154 million per year.

Starting in 2020, Vici expanded beyond the gaming sector, largely by providing construction loans for hospitality and entertainment properties, often with an option to purchase the property after completion. By 2023, Vici had announced financing arrangements for Canyon Ranch spas, Great Wolf Resorts water parks, a Kalahari Resorts water park, Cabot golf resorts, and BigShots Golf driving ranges. It also acquired the Chelsea Piers entertainment complex in Manhattan and 38 Bowlero bowling alleys.

Vici more than doubled its size in 2022 by acquiring MGM Growth Properties and the Venetian complex on the Las Vegas Strip. Vici purchased the real estate of the Venetian complex from Las Vegas Sands in February 2022 for $4 billion. The acquisition included the Venetian and Palazzo casino hotels and the Sands Expo convention center. Apollo Global Management bought the operating business and leased the property from Vici for $250 million per year.

In April 2022, Vici acquired MGM Growth Properties for $17.2 billion (including $5.7 billion in assumed debt). The purchase added full ownership of thirteen properties to Vici's portfolio, and half ownership of the MGM Grand Las Vegas and Mandalay Bay resorts, and increased Vici's annual revenue by $1 billion, along with making it the largest land owner on the Las Vegas Strip, with over 660 acres. Vici bought out the other half of interest in the MGM Grand and Mandalay Bay from Blackstone for $1.27 billion plus $1.5 billion in assumed debt in January 2023.

Several smaller acquisitions were made in 2022 and 2023. Vici expanded to Canada, acquiring eight casinos in Alberta from Pure Canadian Gaming and Century Casinos for a total of US$363 million. It also added Foundation Gaming as a tenant, purchasing two casinos in Mississippi for $293 million, and acquired the Rocky Gap Casino Resort in Maryland for $204 million, in conjunction with Century.

In 2026, Vici acquired seven properties from Golden Entertainment for $1.16 billion, in conjunction with Golden's going-private transaction. It also purchased two more Alberta casinos in conjunction with Pure Canadian Gaming, and a resort in St. Croix in conjunction with Club Med.

== Properties ==
=== Leased to Caesars Entertainment ===
- Caesars Atlantic City – Atlantic City, New Jersey
- Caesars Palace – Paradise, Nevada
- Caesars New Orleans — New Orleans, Louisiana
- Caesars Republic Lake Tahoe – Stateline, Nevada
- Harrah's Atlantic City — Atlantic City, New Jersey
- Harrah's Council Bluffs – Council Bluffs, Iowa
- Harrah's Gulf Coast – Biloxi, Mississippi
- Harrah's Joliet – Joliet, Illinois (80% stake)
- Harrah's Lake Tahoe – Stateline, Nevada
- Harrah's Las Vegas – Paradise, Nevada
- Harrah's Laughlin — Laughlin, Nevada
- Harrah's Metropolis – Metropolis, Illinois
- Harrah's North Kansas City – North Kansas City, Missouri
- Harrah's Philadelphia – Chester, Pennsylvania
- Horseshoe Bossier City – Bossier City, Louisiana
- Horseshoe Council Bluffs – Council Bluffs, Iowa
- Horseshoe Hammond – Hammond, Indiana
- Horseshoe Tunica – Tunica Resorts, Mississippi

=== Leased to Century Casinos ===
- Century Casino Cape Girardeau – Cape Girardeau, Missouri
- Century Casino Caruthersville – Caruthersville, Missouri
- Century Casino & Hotel Edmonton – Edmonton, Alberta
- Century Casino St. Albert — St. Albert, Alberta
- Mountaineer Casino, Racetrack and Resort – New Cumberland, West Virginia
- Rocky Gap Casino Resort – Flintstone, Maryland

=== Leased to Golden Entertainment ===
- Aquarius Casino Resort — Laughlin, Nevada
- Arizona Charlie's Boulder — Las Vegas, Nevada
- Arizona Charlie's Decatur — Las Vegas, Nevada
- Edgewater Hotel and Casino — Laughlin, Nevada
- Lakeside Casino & RV Park — Pahrump, Nevada
- Pahrump Nugget Hotel & Gambling Hall — Pahrump, Nevada
- The Strat Hotel, Casino and Tower — Las Vegas, Nevada

=== Leased to MGM Resorts International ===
- Beau Rivage – Biloxi, Mississippi
- Borgata Hotel Casino and Spa – Atlantic City, New Jersey
- Excalibur Hotel and Casino – Paradise, Nevada
- Luxor Las Vegas – Paradise, Nevada
- Mandalay Bay – Paradise, Nevada
- MGM Grand Detroit – Detroit, Michigan
- MGM Grand Las Vegas – Paradise, Nevada
- MGM National Harbor – Oxon Hill, Maryland
- MGM Springfield – Springfield, Massachusetts
- New York-New York Hotel and Casino – Paradise, Nevada
- Park MGM – Paradise, Nevada
- T-Mobile Arena – Paradise, Nevada (land only)
- Yonkers Raceway & Empire City Casino – Yonkers, New York

=== Leased to Pure Canadian Gaming ===
- Deerfoot Inn & Casino — Calgary, Alberta
- Great Northern Casino — Grande Prairie, Alberta
- Pure Casino Calgary — Calgary, Alberta
- Pure Casino Edmonton — Edmonton, Alberta
- Pure Casino Lethbridge — Lethbridge, Alberta
- Pure Casino Yellowhead — Edmonton, Alberta

=== Leased to other companies ===
- Caesars Southern Indiana – Elizabeth, Indiana (leased to the Eastern Band of Cherokee Indians)
- Carambola Beach Resort – St. Croix, U.S. Virgin Islands (leased to Club Med)
- Chelsea Piers Sports & Entertainment Complex – Manhattan, New York (leasehold interest; subleased to Chelsea Piers)
- Chinook Downs Racetrack — Balzac, Alberta (leased to Highfield Investment Group)
- Fitz Casino & Hotel – Tunica Resorts, Mississippi (leased to Foundation Gaming)
- Gold Strike Tunica – Tunica Resorts, Mississippi (leased to Cherokee Nation Businesses)
- Hard Rock Casino Cincinnati — Cincinnati, Ohio (leased to Hard Rock International)
- Hollywood Casino at Greektown — Detroit, Michigan (leased to Penn National Gaming)
- Jack Cleveland Casino – Cleveland, Ohio (leased to Jack Entertainment)
- Jack Thistledown Racino – North Randall, Ohio (leased to Jack Entertainment)
- Margaritaville Resort Casino – Bossier City, Louisiana (leased to Penn National Gaming)
- The Mirage – Paradise, Nevada (leased to Hard Rock International)
- Northern Mile Racetrack — Edmonton International Airport, Leduc County, Alberta (leased to Highfield Investment Group)
- Northfield Park Racino – Northfield, Ohio (leased to Clairvest)
- Sphere – Paradise, Nevada (land only; leased to Sphere Entertainment)
- The Venetian Las Vegas – Paradise, Nevada (leased to Apollo Global Management)
- WaterView Casino & Hotel – Vicksburg, Mississippi (leased to Foundation Gaming)
- 38 bowling alleys (leased to Bowlero)

=== Golf courses ===
The company owns four golf courses, operated by Cabot:

- Cascata Golf Club – Boulder City, Nevada
- Chariot Run Golf Club – Laconia, Indiana
- Grand Bear Golf Club – Saucier, Mississippi
- Serket Golf Club – Henderson, Nevada

=== Former properties ===
- Bally's Atlantic City – Atlantic City, New Jersey – Sold in 2020.
- Bluegrass Downs – Paducah, Kentucky – Closed in 2019; donated in 2020.
- Harrah's Louisiana Downs – Bossier City, Louisiana – Sold in 2021.
- Harrah's Reno – Reno, Nevada – Closed and sold in 2020.
- Tunica Roadhouse – Tunica Resorts, Mississippi – Closed in 2020 and demolished.
