= Horseshoe St. Louis =

Casino hotel in Missouri, United States

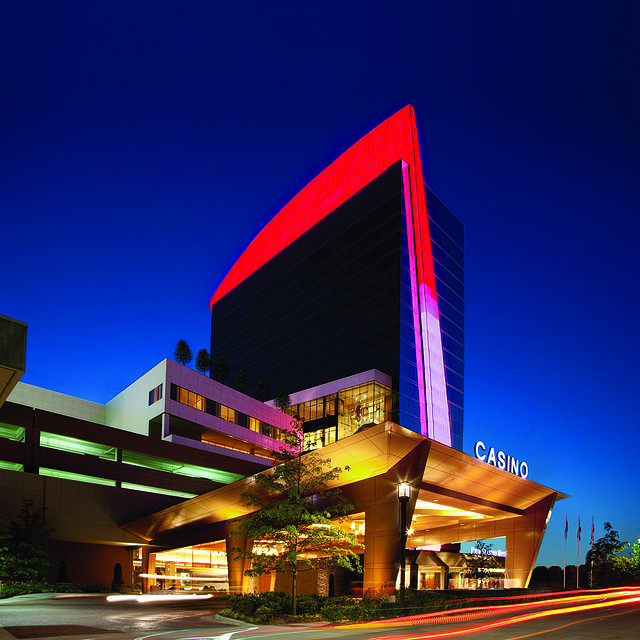
- Interactive map of Horseshoe St. Louis
- Location: St. Louis, Missouri; 999 N. 2nd St.; 38°38′01″N 90°11′06″W
- Opened: December 19, 2007
- No. of rooms: 500
- Gaming space: 75,000 sq ft (7,000 m^{2})
- Owner: Gaming and Leisure Properties
- Operating license holder: Caesars Entertainment
- Architect: Marnell Corrao Associates
- Previous names: Lumière Place
- Public transit access: MetroBus; MCT; Red Blue; At Laclede's Landing
- Website: caesars.com/horseshoe-st-louis

Horseshoe St. Louis, formerly Lumière Place, is a casino hotel in St. Louis, Missouri. It is owned by Gaming and Leisure Properties and operated by Caesars Entertainment.

== History ==
Located in downtown St. Louis, Lumière Place opened on December 19, 2007 by Pinnacle Entertainment. The resort overlooks the Mississippi River and sits less than one mile (1.6 km) from the Gateway Arch and is within walking distance of the Dome at America's Center and Busch Stadium. The Horseshoe houses two hotels, the Hotel Lumière at the Arch and Four Seasons St. Louis, the only Missouri hotel to receive the AAA Five Diamond Award.

The property won the Readers' Choice award for "Best Casino" in the 2013 Riverfront Times Best of St. Louis awards.

In March 2014, Lumière Place hosted a World Series of Poker Circuit tournament.

In April 2014, Tropicana Entertainment acquired the Lumière Place complex from Pinnacle Entertainment for $260 million.

In April 2018, Tropicana struck an agreement to sell its real estate assets, including Lumière Place, to Gaming and Leisure Properties (GLP), while Eldorado Resorts (now Caesars Entertainment) would buy Tropicana's operating business and lease its properties from GLP. The deal provoked anti-competition concerns because it would leave GLP as the owner of all six casinos in the St. Louis area (though without operational control of any of them). The Missouri Gaming Commission rejected the sale because of these concerns, and the deal was modified such that Eldorado would acquire the Lumière Place real estate for $246 million, financed by a loan from GLP. The sale was completed in October 2018.

Two years later, the Commission reversed its decision and authorized GLP to own Lumière Place. GLP took ownership of the property in October 2020 in satisfaction of the loan, and leased it back to Caesars for $23 million per year.

In May 2022, Caesars rebranded Lumière Place as Horseshoe St. Louis.

== Facility ==
The 75,000-square-foot (7,000 m^{2}) Horseshoe casino floor features approximately 950 slots, 40 tables and a 10-table poker room.

The Hotel Lumiere at the Arch has 294 all-suite guest rooms and the 19-story Four Seasons Hotel St. Louis has 200 rooms, including 14 suites.

The property also features a 453-seat theater for live entertainment. Since its debut in 2008, the theater has played host to The Go-Go's, Joan Rivers, Thunder from Down Under, Louie Anderson, John Witherspoon, Chippendales, Brandy, Eddie Money, Chrisette Michele, WBF Championship Boxing, mixed martial arts fights and even the taping of an episode of TLC’s Cake Boss where Buddy Valastro unveiled a 700-pound (320 kg) cake featuring Lumière Place and other St. Louis landmarks.

The resort was designed by Marnell Corrao Associates, the Las Vegas-based architectural firm that also built the Bellagio for 508 million. To satisfy state law that only allows for gambling on floating platforms within a 1000 foot distance of the Missouri and Mississippi river, the casino floor is actually an eight-foot-thick concrete raft afloat in a basin holding more than 1.5 million gallons of purified water. The architectural design used advanced construction techniques employing continuous concrete pour to achieve a water tight basin on which a "barge" is floated. Visitors to the facility have no indication that the casino floor is technically floating.
