= Mountaineer Casino Resort =

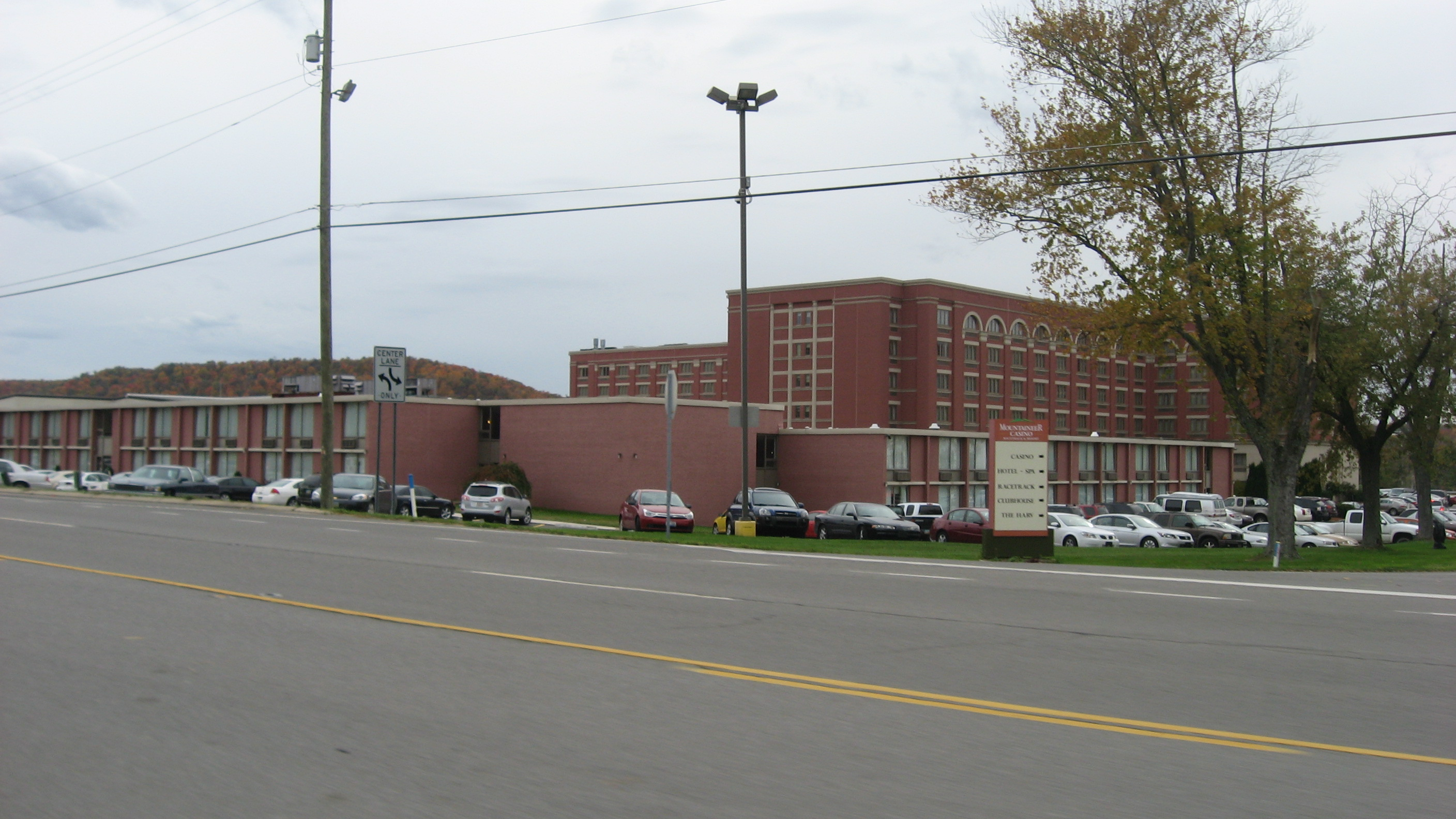
- Roadside view of the casino
- Interactive map of Mountaineer Casino Resort
- Location: New Cumberland, West Virginia
- Owned by: Vici Properties
- Operated by: Century Casinos
- Date opened: May 19, 1951
- Race type: Thoroughbred
- Notable races: West Virginia Derby

- Waterford Park
- U.S. National Register of Historic Places
- Location within West Virginia Location within the United States
- Location: WV 2,
- Coordinates: 40°34′49″N 80°39′42″W
- Area: 77 acres (31 ha)
- Built: 1949
- Architects: Boyle, A.J.
- Architectural style: Moderne
- NRHP reference No.: 02001528
- Added to NRHP: December 12, 2002

Mountaineer Casino Resort is a thoroughbred racetrack and casino resort located on the Ohio River north of New Cumberland, West Virginia. It is owned by Vici Properties and operated by Century Casinos. It is notable for being the first race track in the United States to get slot machines and become a racino.

== History and information ==
Originally to be known as Waterford Downs, the track's parent company was incorporated in 1937. The effort was led by Al Boyle, president of the Charles Town Races, who named it after his family's ancestral home of Waterford, Ireland. The company's initial public offering was approved in February 1939, with the track expected to open the following September. By August 1940, construction had not begun, but 250 acres of land had been bought or optioned. In 1942, Boyle planned to begin construction of the track, but expected the grandstand to be delayed at least until 1943 by a steel shortage due to World War II.

Construction was finally underway by July 1948, with opening scheduled for September 1949. The name was changed to Waterford Park in 1950. Opening day was finally held on May 19, 1951.

In the mid-1950s, Boyle sold the track to James F. Edwards. The Ogden Corporation acquired Edwards's holdings, including Waterford Park, in 1969.

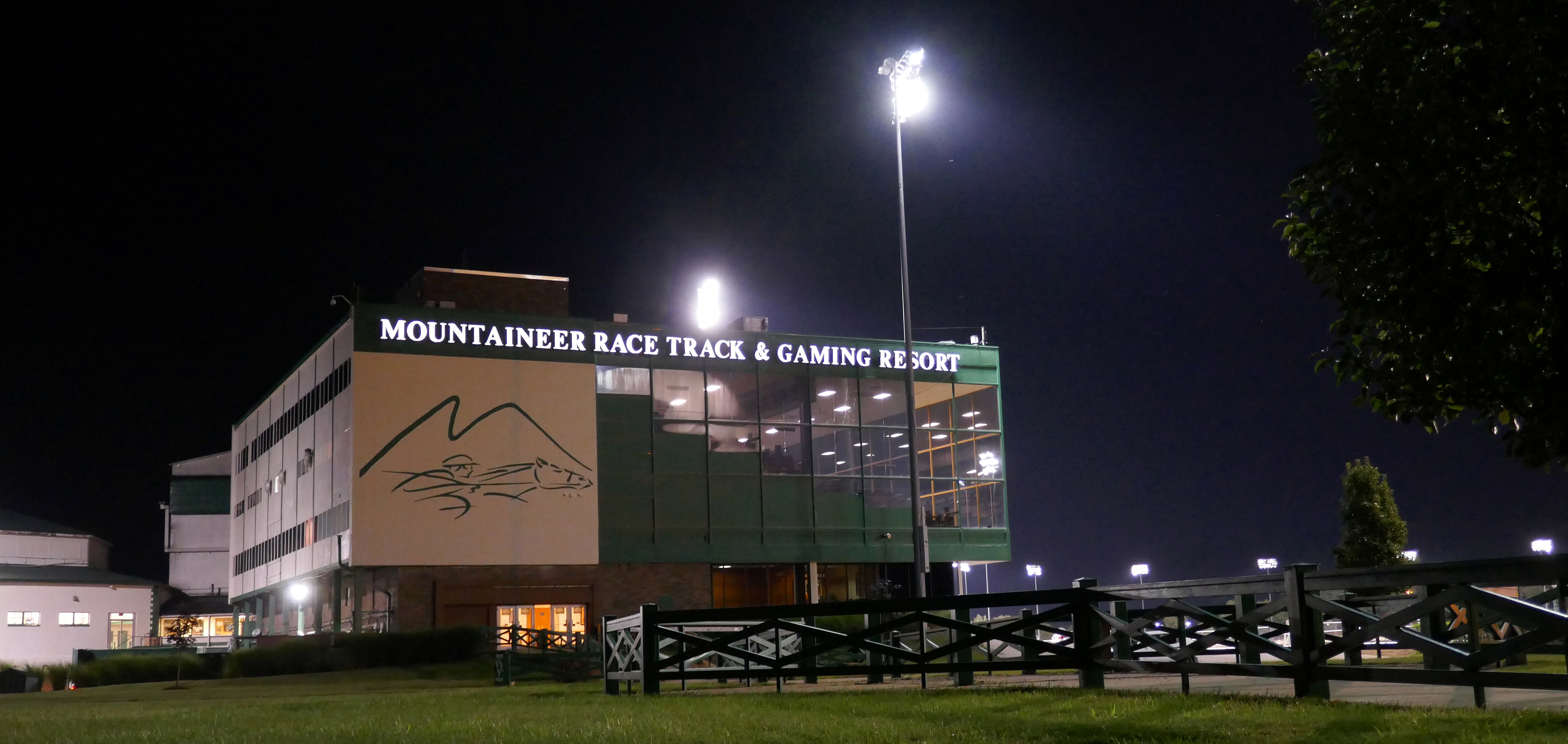
The clubhouse at the Mountaineer Park racetrack after an evening of racing.

The track was purchased by Bill Blair and renamed as Mountaineer Park in 1987. In 1992, Blair sold the track to California-based Excalibur Holding Co. for $4 million cash plus $2.7 million in stock. The track was authorized to have slot machines and installed them in 1994. Excalibur was renamed Winners Entertainment, then renamed MTR Gaming Group.

Mountaineer added casino table games on December 20, 2007, with 50 tables, including blackjack, three card poker, and roulette.

In 2019, Eldorado Resorts (which had merged with MTR Gaming in 2014) sold Mountaineer, along with two other properties, to Century Casinos and Vici Properties. Century bought Mountaineer's operating business for $30 million, while Vici bought the land and buildings for $97 million and leased them to Century.

The track was listed in the National Register of Historic Places on December 12, 2002.

== Physical attributes ==
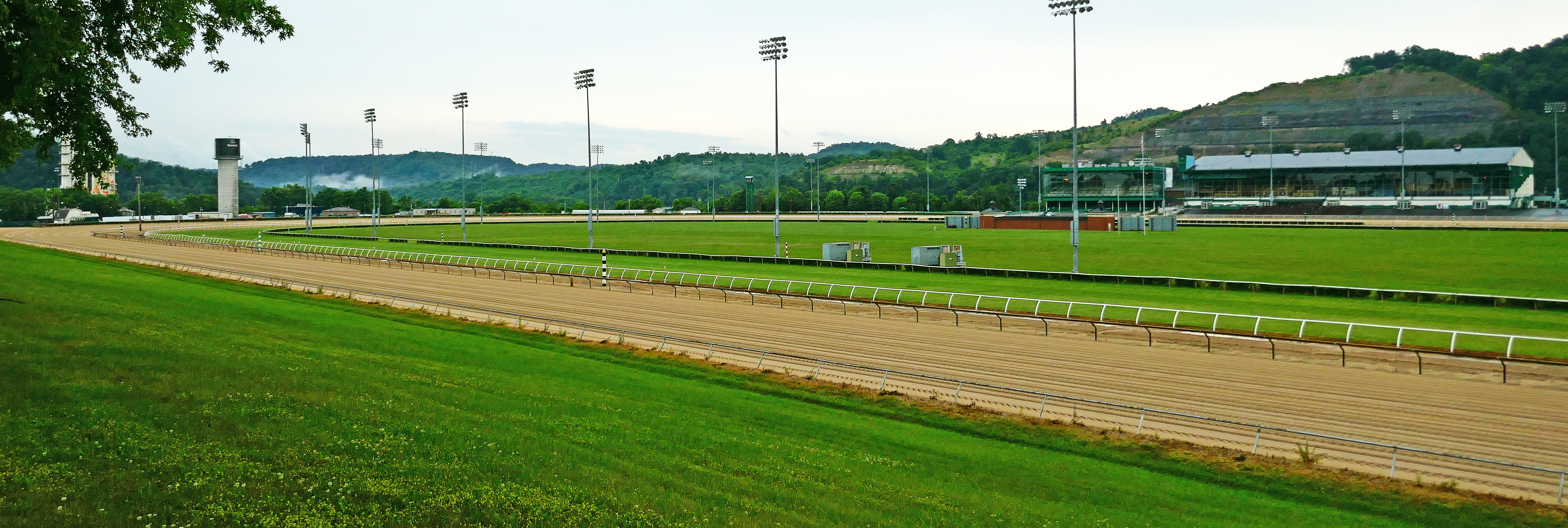
The backstretches at the Mountaineer Park racetrack, with the turf course inside the outer main (dirt) track.

The track has a main dirt track with a one-mile oval. The turf course is seven furlongs long and inside the dirt. The track is curved slightly in the front stretch. The track also has a large casino and resort on site.

The casino has 3,200 slot machines.

== Racing ==
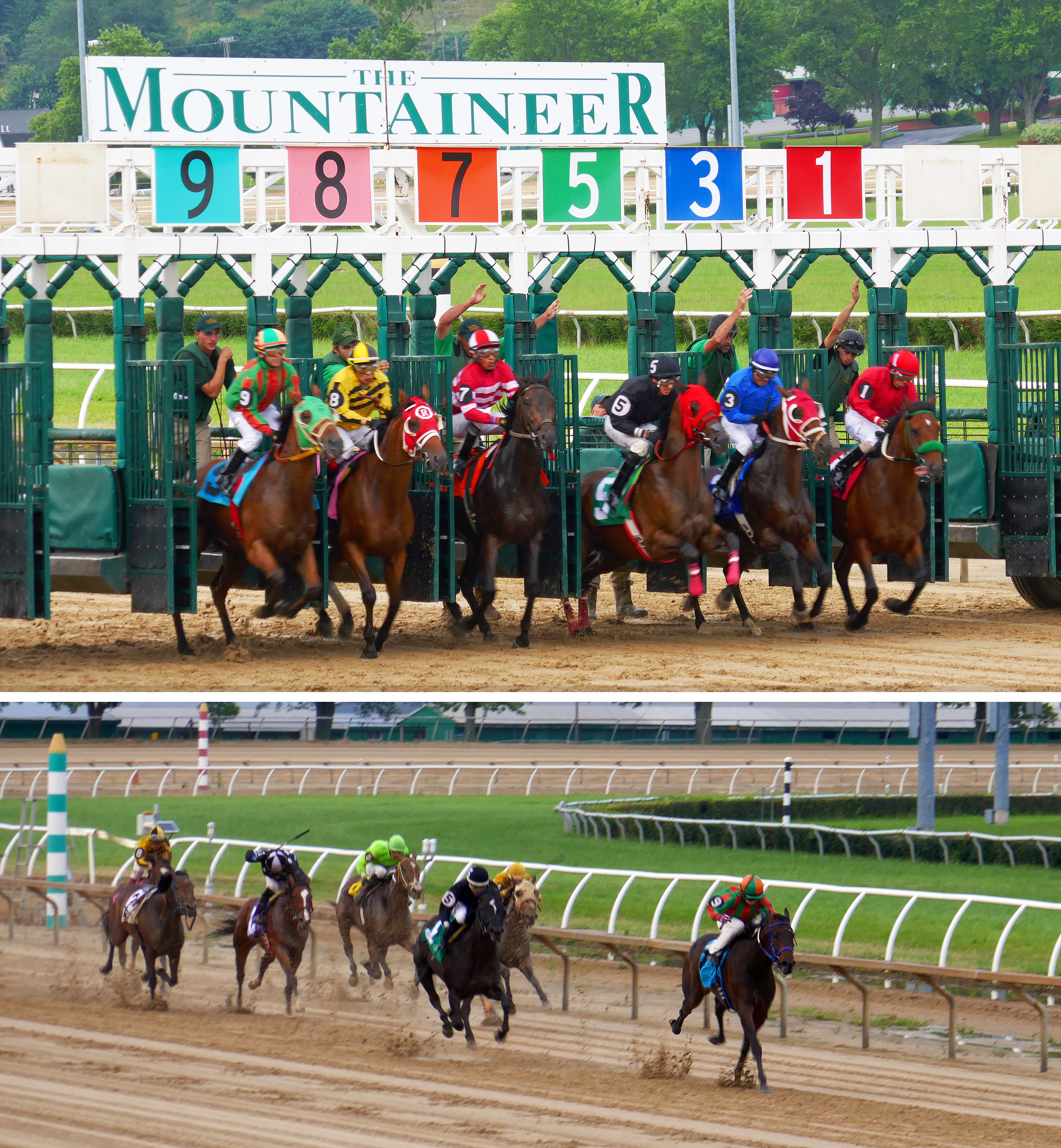
The start and stretch run on a sloppy main (dirt) track at the Mountaineer Park racetrack.

Mountaineer was one of the busiest Thoroughbred courses in the country with as many as 217 racing dates scheduled in year 2012. The Mountaineer live racing season had consisted of 4 to 5 nights per week, starting as early as March and ending as late as December. This had been reduced to 130 racing dates, running May through November by 2019 The track had been able to offer purses much higher than those in neighboring states and attracted larger field and the products of such a higher parimutuel handle and better attendance. Over the past decade, competition from surrounding states increased, and purses have reduced. Mountaineer hosts the West Virginia Derby, a Grade III race that had significantly grown in stature and purse in the late 2000s and early 2010s to a Grade II race, but has also had its purse reduced and reverted to a Grade III race in recent years. The first Saturday in August traditionally has been the day the Derby takes place, and is the only day of the calendar that the track offers afternoon racing. Otherwise, the races are run at 7pm. Mountaineer had previously been considered as a possible host for the 2009 Breeders' Cup, but it was awarded to Santa Anita.

The track runs many stakes and overnight handicaps. Here, in order, are the stakes that ran at Mountaineer in 2005:

=== Graded events ===
The following Graded events were held at Mountaineer Racetrack in 2019.

Grade III

- West Virginia Derby
- West Virginia Governor's Stakes

=== Stakes events ===
- Coca-Cola Independence Day Stakes
- Firecracker Stakes
- Mountain State Stakes
- Harvey Arneault Memorial Breeders' Cup Stakes
- West Virginia Senate President's Breeders' Cup
- West Virginia House of Delegates Speaker's Cup
- West Virginia Legislature Chairman's Cup
- West Virginia Secretary of State
- Mountaineer Juvenile Stakes
- Mountaineer Juvenile Fillies Stakes
  - Fall Stakes
- Autumn Leaves Stakes
- Mountaineer Mile Handicap
- Sophomore Sprint Championship Stakes

== See also ==
- List of casinos in West Virginia
- List of casino hotels
