= Chinook Downs Racetrack =

- Interactive map of Chinook Downs Racetrack
- Location: 260 Century Downs Drive, Rocky View County, Alberta T4A 0V5
- Coordinates: 51°12′04″N 113°58′51″W
- Owned by: Vici Properties
- Operated by: Highfield Investment Group
- Date opened: April 2015
- Race type: Standardbred, quarterhorse, chuckwagon and thoroughbred racing
- Course type: Flat dirt, 5 1/2 furlongs

Chinook Downs Racetrack, formerly Century Downs Racetrack, is a casino and horse racing track near Calgary.

It is one of two "A-level" horse racing venues in the province of Alberta and brought live horse racing back to the Calgary area for the first time since June 15, 2008. Century Downs offers live Standardbred races on weekends and holidays throughout the months of April to November.

The casino features 650 slot machines, seven VLTs, and an off-track betting area which simulcasts both Standardbred and Thoroughbred races from around the world. Dining facilities include a lounge and the Mid City Grill restaurant.

Century Downs first opened on April 1, 2015. Its first day of Standardbred racing was on April 25, 2015.

In 2023, Century sold the real estate of its four Alberta casinos, including Century Downs, to Vici Properties for a total of $222 million, in a sale-and-leaseback agreement.

In 2026, Highfield Investment Group purchased the operating business of Century Downs, as well as Century Mile Racetrack in Edmonton (now Northern Mile), from Century for $23 million. The Century branding was removed from the property and it was renamed as Chinook Downs Racetrack. The casino will be known as Spire Casino.

== See also ==
- List of casinos and horse racing tracks in Alberta
