= River District (Chicago) =

Proposed urban development

Coordinates: 41°53′43″N 87°38′44″W

- Interactive map of River District
- Location: Chicago

Companies
- Developer: Tribune Media

Technical details
- Size: 37 acres

The River District was a proposed 37 acre urban development in Chicago. Tribune Media announced plans for the site in October 2017. The site currently features a printing plant leased by the Chicago Tribune from Tribune Media and has been publicly discussed as a potential site for redevelopment. The planned development for the site was approved by the city in October 2018, and in February 2019, Tribune Media listed the site for sale with Eastdil Secured. The company is currently in a joint venture agreement with Riverside Investment and Development for 7 of the 37 acres at 700 W. Chicago Avenue, the now-vacant site of the former Chicago Tribune insertion plant. A large city casino is envisioned for the area.

The River District is one of several mega and large scale development projects over the last few years either completed, under construction, or planned in Chicago. Others include the Chicago Riverwalk, Bloomingdale Trail, Lincoln Yards, The 78, St. Regis Chicago, One Chicago, Wolf Point Towers, Tribune East Tower, Bronzeville Lakefront, One Central, a city casino, an $8.5 billion revamp of O'Hare International Airport, an extension of the Red Line subway/elevated train, and the Barack Obama Presidential Center among other projects.
