= Chicago casino proposals =

Set of proposals for the first casino in Chicago

The Chicago Casino Proposals is a request for proposals made to the City of Chicago, for the first permanent casino within city limits. There were 5 original proposals. After vetoing 2, there were 3 remaining after the first round of selections. This included the Bally's Tribune site, the Hard Rock International One Chicago site, and the Rush Street Gaming 78 neighborhood site. On May 5, 2022, Mayor Lori Lightfoot announced that the Bally's Tribune site was the choice as the location for a city casino.

== History ==
In 1990, when Illinois enacted the Riverboat Gambling Act, casinos had to be located on a river, and had to set sail during gambling. Over time these restrictions throughout the state of Illinois were lessened. For instance, in 2011, Rivers Casino in Des Plaines had to be built over a shallow pit of water. In 2019, the state enacted a change (SB0516) to the Riverboat Gambling act which allowed land based casinos.

When the 2019 amendment was passed, it also allowed a casino in Chicago. Discussion for a casino in Chicago had been happening for almost 30 years since gambling was allowed in Illinois. The primary reason for a casino in Chicago was due to large amount of tax revenue gained, which would amount to approximately $200 million in annual tax revenue. The tax rate would amount to one-third of all tax revenue from a new casino. The amendment allowed up to 4,000 slot machines or gambling table seats. Mayor Lightfoot was hoping for the amendment to include a provision for a city-owned casino, but the amendment did not include that.

== Original proposals ==
On April 22, 2021, Mayor Lightfoot announced that Chicago was seeking proposals to build and operate a casino. It had to include a hotel of up to 500 rooms, restaurants and bars and entertainment venues. The operator who would be awarded the license would also be allowed to operate slot machines at the two Chicago airports. After a proposal would be accepted by Lightfoot, they would move to the City Council, and finally the Illinois Gaming Board. Once state approval was gained, a casino could have a temporary gaming location. The casino was expected to be open by 2025. The proposals were due by 23 August 2021.

=== Bally’s Corporation ===
==== Chicago Tribune Publishing Center ====
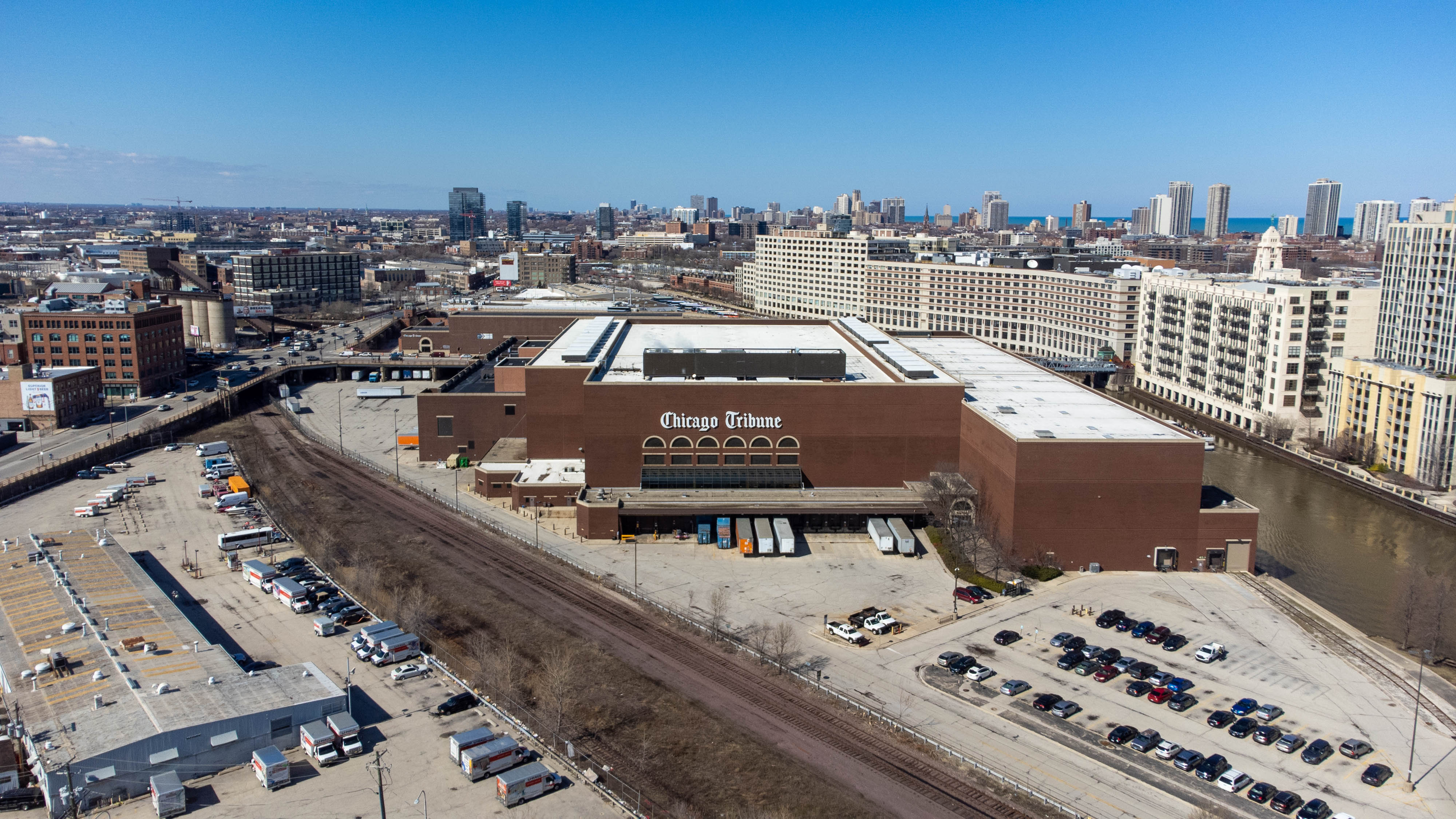
Freedom Center, where the proposed Bally's casino would be located.

Bally's Corporation proposed to put a $1.6 billion casino and resort, where the current Chicago Tribune Publishing Center, more well known as "Freedom Center", is. This is located in the River North neighborhood of Chicago. Bally's has an option to buy the 30-acre site with the sellers. Bally's originally had a plan to retrofit a former warehouse at the current Tribune plant in order to serve as a temporary casino while the casino is being built. The first phase of the process would cost $1 billion, which would include 2700 slot machines, 95 table games, a suite-only hotel, with 100 suites. There would also be an outdoor music venue with space for 1000 people. After having a 20% return on investment from phase 1, Bally's would have a $600 million expansion. There would be a total of 4000 gaming seats with the expansion, a new 400 room hotel, a 3000-seat indoor venue, and a 20,000 feet exhibition space.

==== McCormick Place Truck Marshaling Yard ====
The proposal by Bally's Corporation to build a casino at the McCormick Place truck marshaling yard was exactly the same as the Tribune proposal, except at a different location, 3050 Moe Dr.

=== Hard Rock International ===
Hard Rock International proposed a casino within the One Central project, which was still in the planning phase at the time. It would be located directly north of McCormick Place, and be east of Soldier Field. It would sit on top of a current 35-acre Metra train yard, with the yard still remaining underneath. It would cost $1.7 billion to build, and would include up to 500 hotel rooms, a 3500-seat theater, 3400 slot machines, and 166 table games.

=== Rush Street Gaming ===
==== 78 neighborhood ====
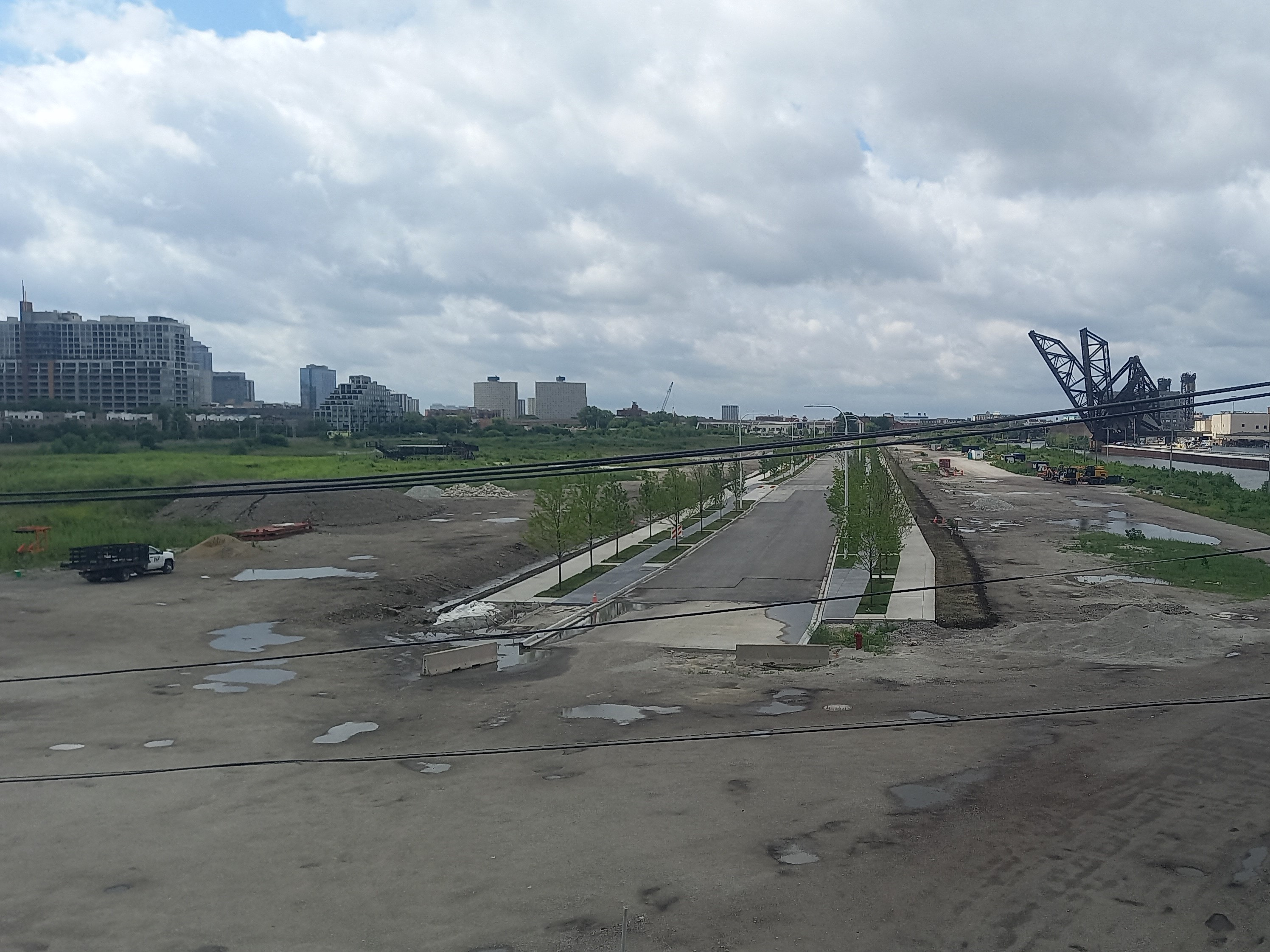
The 78 in 2021, where the proposed Rivers Casino is to be located.

Rush Street Gaming, owner of Rivers Casino, proposed to put a casino at "The 78". It would be over 450,000 sq. ft. inside, and be home to 2600 slots and 190 table games. It would also have a 300-room luxury hotel, along with a 1000 ft observation tower. It was projected to attract over 7 million annual visitors. It was later announced that Rush Street planned to have a riverboat as a temporary casino while the main structure was being built.

==== Lakeside Center ====
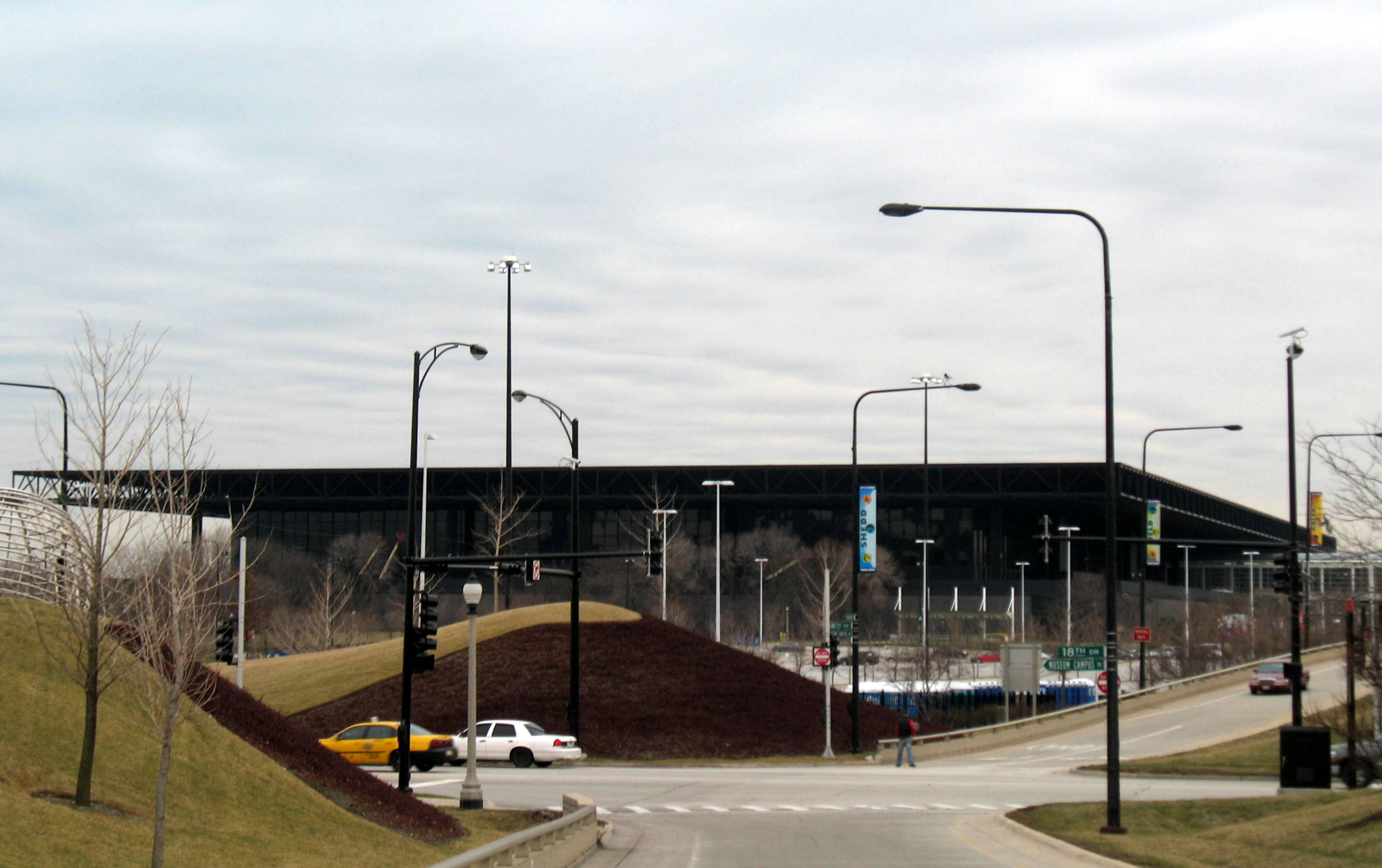
Lakeside Center, where the proposed Rivers Casino was to be located.

Rush Street Gaming also proposed to convert the 50-year-old Lakeside Center at McCormick Place into a casino. It be home to a 480,000 sq. ft. casino, that would also be home to 2,600 slots and 190 table games. It would also house a 4200-seat theater. It would cost approximately $1 billion to redevelop the building.

== Selections ==
The original deadline was moved to 29 October 2021, from 23 August 2021, due to several bidders wanting additional time. After the deadline passed, the city announced they received 5 proposals, from 3 different companies.

=== Proposal finalists ===
On 22 March 2022, Lightfoot announced that there were 3 finalists out of the 5 proposed. The Bally's Freedom Center proposal, the Hard Rock One Central proposal, and the Rivers 78 proposal were the three finalists. Each of the three finalists had to participate in a community engagement meeting where the public asked questions and commented on the proposals. After the meetings, the city would negotiate with the three finalists, and pick one to present to the City Council, where it would face a vote. If it passed there, it would later move to the Illinois Gaming Board. The two proposals that were axed had a litany of reasons behind their rejection. Along with facing a slew of political pressure, the two canned proposals would have each not been financially viable. The city estimated that the Truck Yard proposal would have brought in $156.2 million yearly to the city, while the Lakeside center proposal would have brought in $160.3 million to the city. Jennie Huang Bennett, the city's chief financial officer said that the taxes "weren’t sufficient to cover" the cost to expand McCormick Place to compensate for the lost real estate.

=== Lightfoot selection ===
On May 5, 2022, Mayor Lightfoot announced that she had chosen the Chicago Tribune Freedom Center Bally's Proposal. Her rationale for the decision related to having a labor agreement with the Chicago Federal of Labor, as well as not having a competing casino in the Chicago area. Bally's also announced their plans to use the Medinah Temple, as the temporary casino location, instead of the warehouse previously proposed. The temporary casino is to open by the second quarter of 2023, with the permanent location opening by the first quarter of 2026. The proposal still has to undergo steps after the decision, which includes getting a majority vote passed the city council, as well as gaming board approval. The proposal still faces challenges such as facing city council approval and Illinois Gaming Board approval. Public reaction was mixed to the announcement, with many nearby residents voicing opposition. “The game is not over yet,” said Brian Israel, president of the River North Residents Association, in reference to the selection process.
