= Hard Rock Hotel & Casino Biloxi =

Integrated resort in Harrison County, Mississippi, U.S.

Coordinates: 30.392103°N 88.887780°W

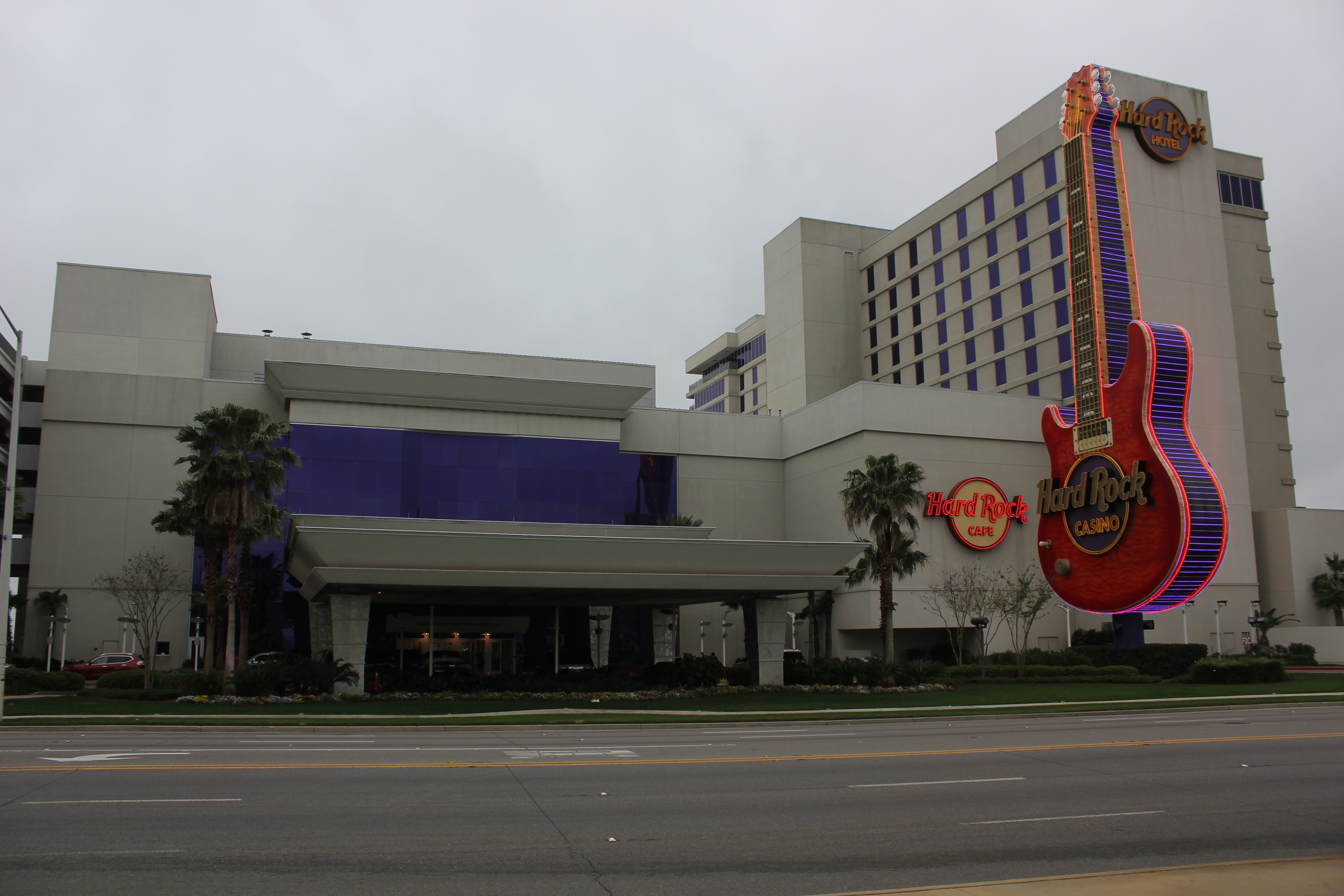
- Exterior view (April 2017)
- Interactive map of Hard Rock Hotel & Casino Biloxi
- Location: Biloxi, Mississippi, U.S.; 777 Beach Boulevard, 39530
- Opened: July 7, 2007; 19 years ago
- Theme: Rock and roll
- No. of rooms: 479
- Gaming space: 50,000 square feet (4,600 m^{2})
- Signature attractions: Hard Rock Live; Live #Remix; Center Bar
- Notable restaurants: Hard Rock Cafe; Ruth's Chris Steak House; Half Shell Oyster House; Sugar Factory
- Casino type: Riverboat (2003–2005); Beachfront (2007–present)
- Owner: Gaming and Leisure Properties
- Operating license holder: Bally's Corporation
- Architect: Steelman Partners; Bergman Walls & Associates
- Public transit access: CTA
- Website: hrhcbiloxi.com
- Building details
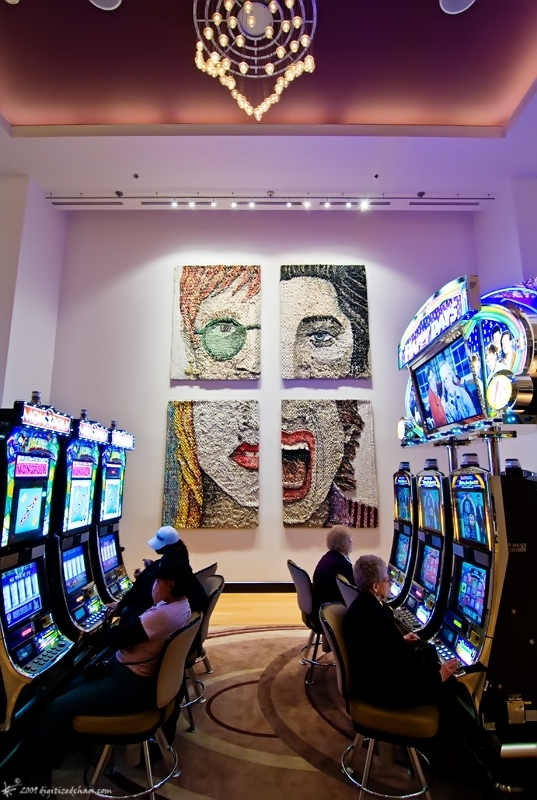
- Interior view (August 2009)

General information
- Construction started: February 10, 2004 (resumed September 2006 after Hurricane Katrina damage)
- Construction stopped: August 29, 2005
- Completed: 2005 (original); 2007 (reconstruction)

Design and construction
- Developer: Premier Entertainment Biloxi LLC (Leucadia National Corporation) in a joint venture with Hard Rock International
- Main contractor: Ray Anderson Corp.

Hard Rock Hotel & Casino Biloxi is an integrated resort in Biloxi, Mississippi, United States. It is owned by Gaming and Leisure Properties and operated by Bally's Corporation, formerly Twin River Worldwide Holdings, under franchise from Hard Rock International. The resort opened on July 7, 2007. The property features the Royal Tower, and, added in early 2014, the Platinum Tower.

Originally planned to open in September 2005, the resort remained closed for another two years as a result of Hurricane Katrina, which completely destroyed the resort's casino barge and violently slammed it against the hotel. As of August 2021, it has been the only resort managed by Bally's to not rebrand under their name.

== History ==
=== 2002–2007: Planning and construction ===
In 2002, Premier Entertainment Biloxi LLC was formed by the Leucadia National Corporation specifically to build a gaming complex and entertainment resort on along 8.5 acres (3.4 ha) of the shoreline in Biloxi, Mississippi, and signed a licensing agreement with The Rank Group Plc-owned Hard Rock Cafe International affiliate Hard Rock Hotel Licensing, Inc. on May 16, 2003. In December of that year, an $82 million construction contract with Ray Anderson Corporation of Gulfport, MS was signed, and at the end of that year, a lease agreement would allow the resort to franchise Hard Rock Cafe, even though the brand generally does not franchise cafes in the United States.

A groundbreaking ceremony was held on February 10, 2004, and construction began with an 18-month timeline. By March 5 of that year, the original proposal was a $235 million, 388,000-square-foot (36,000 m^{2}) resort featuring a 306-room hotel tower, a floating casino with 50 table games and 1,500 slot machines, a Hard Rock Live concert venue, and a Hard Rock Cafe, all at 777 Beach Boulevard, the former location of the Gold Shore Casino.

==== Hurricane Katrina and reconstruction ====
Construction was completed in August 2005, and Hard Rock Hotel & Casino Biloxi was originally scheduled to have a soft opening on September 1, followed by a grand opening on September 8 of that year. However, on August 29, 2005, Hurricane Katrina struck the Gulf Coast, disconnecting the two-story casino barge from its moorings and destroying it completely by tossing it over, and then slamming it into the rear of the hotel tower.

The rest of the main hotel and 112-foot (34 m) neon Peavey guitar sign survived the storm largely intact, though still damaged and required repairs. Reconstruction and reopening of the property was in limbo for a time because of a legal dispute between owner Premier Entertainment and the trustee for bondholders on the property. In September 2006, Premier filed for Chapter 11 bankruptcy protection. On June 1, 2006, Hard Rock announced the updated projected opening to be in July 2007, and the heavily damaged barge would be scrapped in favor of a land-based casino with sturdier cement pilings, as the hurricane forced Mississippi to change their laws to allow land-based gaming complexes. Premier later began architectural work on a newly rebuilt facility, awaiting resolution of the dispute, prior to workers securing the property for the 2007 Atlantic hurricane season. Project manager Karl Bulot stated "Nobody got to see it. You've gotta start over."

=== 2007–2014: Grand opening and early years ===
Reconstruction was completed, and the casino held a soft opening to the public on June 30, 2007, followed by a "Lucky 777" grand opening celebration on July 7 of that year with a guitar-smashing ceremony, and concert performances in the first month of business, including Kid Rock, Poison, Ratt, and Cheap Trick. 3 Doors Down opened the 12-story hotel with 318 rooms and suites, and Hard Rock Live on July 5, 2007. By the time of this opening, Hard Rock International was now owned by the Seminole Tribe of Florida. As a reference to Katrina, the resort's official internal motto after opening was You Can't Kill Rock & Roll.

On July 24, 2012, a $32.5 million expansion to add a 12-story, 154-room hotel tower was approved, planned to create construction and permanent jobs of 250 and 90, respectively. Tax breaks were requested for the project. The expansion was announced on September 26 of that year, and the hotel had a soft opening on January 31, 2014 as the Platinum Tower, followed by a grand opening on February 9. In July 2014, Twin River Worldwide Holdings acquired the property from Leucadia National for $250 million. Twin River had sought to diversify itself geographically because its Rhode Island casino faced an increase in competition from casinos to be built in Massachusetts. When the acquisition was announced on December 15, 2013, the Hard Rock's casino had 1,342 slot machines, four pokers, and 51 table games, and a 325-room AAA Four Diamond hotel tower with private cabanas and a pool, alongside a fitness center and spa, and Ruth's Chris Steak House as one of its five restaurants besides Hard Rock Cafe. The addition of the Platinum Tower brought the total number of rooms to 479.

=== 2019–present: Bally's Corporation ===
In March 2019, Twin River completed a reverse merger with Dover Downs Gaming and Entertainment, resulting in the company becoming a publicly traded entity on the New York Stock Exchange (NYSE) and Hard Rock Biloxi becoming a flagship property. In March 2020, due to the COVID-19 pandemic, the Mississippi Gaming Commission ordered all casinos, including the Hard Rock, to close temporarily. The property safely reopened to the public on May 21 of that year under strict social distancing guidelines, including capacity limitations, and thermal camera temperature checks.

In October 2020, Twin River purchased Bally Entertainment from Caesars Entertainment for $20 million, and rebranded to Bally's Corporation, stating that "virtually all" of its properties would use the Bally's name, but announced later on August 11, 2021 that Hard Rock Biloxi would be an exception from this standardization. On January 4, 2023, Bally's sold the land and buildings to Gaming and Leisure Properties in a leaseback transaction.

== Features ==
=== Memorabilia and Hurricane Katrina ===
Among other memorabilia that was found by local residents and returned to the Hard Rock after Katrina was Elvis Presley's Army uniform, confused as a Boy Scout uniform, found on a mannequin floating in the Mississippi Sound. The hurricane caused the majority of memorabilia to be entirely damaged or covered in mud. Also on display are B.B. King's original guitar "Lucille" returned as well along with guitars from Earl Thomas Conley, Dimebag Darrell, Johnny Cash, and Kiss, as well as clothing from Steven Tyler and Elton John, along with a composite hunting bow of Ted Nugent.

Some of the rock artifacts are in pristine condition, but others are part of a Katrina memorial collage. Damage caused by the hurricane also included the original barge's "Center Bar" to float away entirely detached, alongside a water heater "the size of a Volkswagen van."

=== Restaurants and entertainment ===
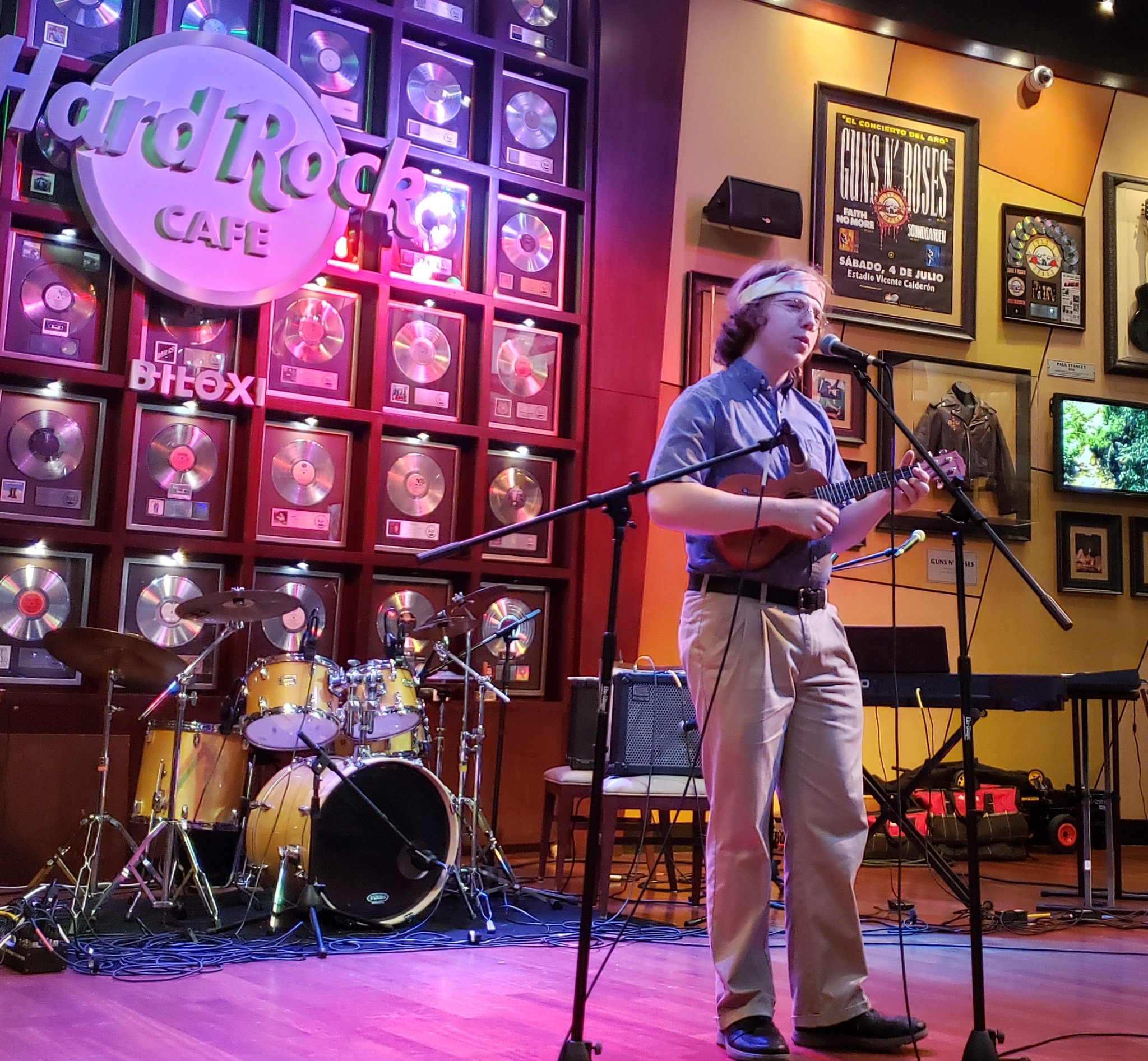
Jonathan T. Freeman (May 2022)

Hard Rock Cafe and Ruth's Chris were flagships that opened alongside the resort. Announced on December 11, 2014, Half Shell Oyster House would be added to the property, joining 24/7 Grille, Starbucks, Satisfaction Buffet, and Ben & Jarry's. Pie Five Pizza Co. was added on May 8, 2015.

MTV's Wild 'n Out star Nick Cannon was involved in the February 28, 2019 soft opening of Sugar Factory, which would host a grand opening on March 29 of that year. Also featured in the resort is the Center Bar, the Rock Spa, the Body Rock Fitness Center, and the Live #Remix weekend-only dance club at night, which is part of the 1,500-seat Hard Rock Live arena. That venue spans 13,000 square feet (1,200 m^{2}), featuring a 7,452-square-foot (692.3 m^{2}) indoor theater, and the 1,683-square-foot (156.4 m^{2}) Rock & Roll meeting area. Live Nation Entertainment has involvement in its operations alongside Seminole Hard Rock Entertainment.

== Gallery ==
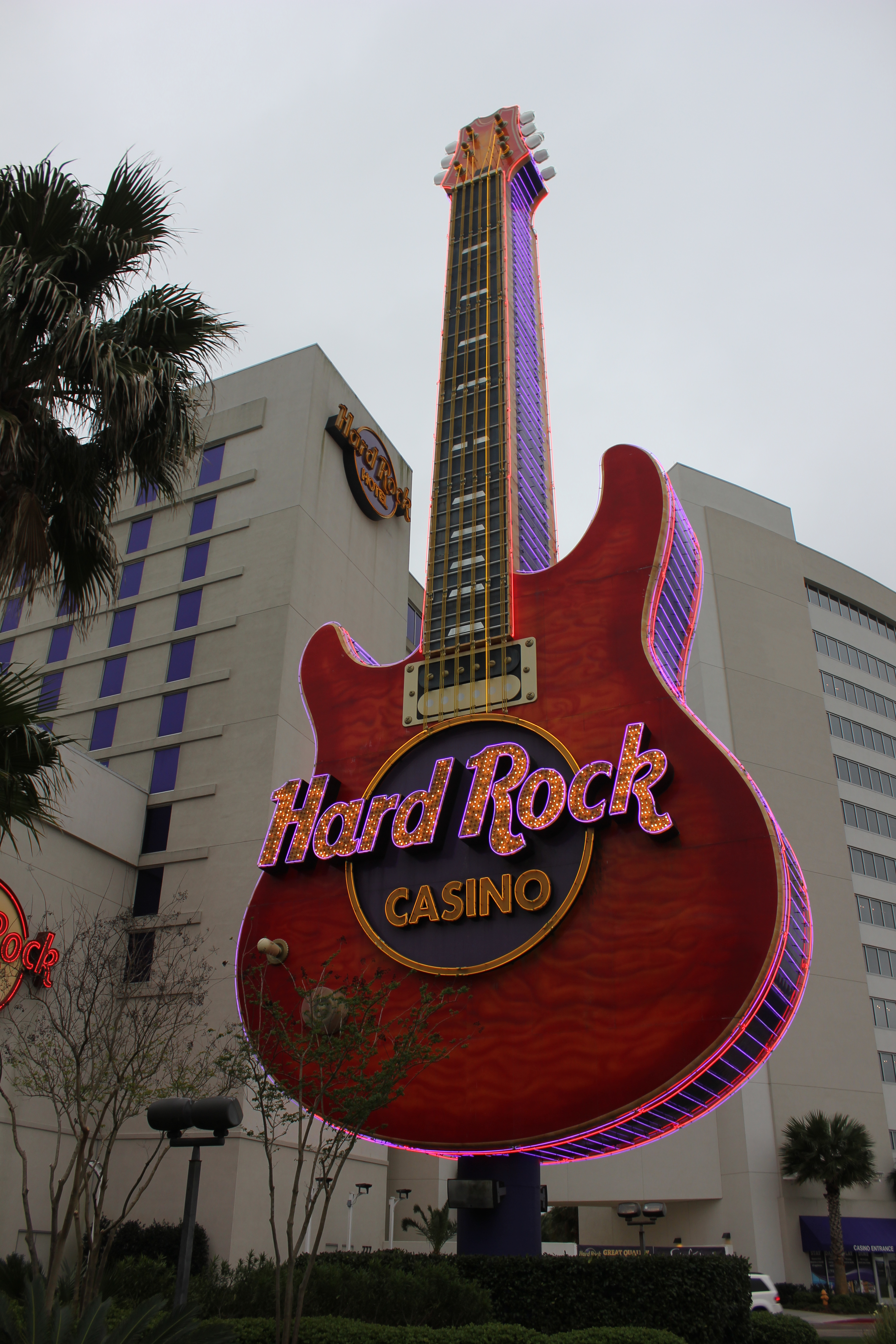
Guitar sign (April 2017)

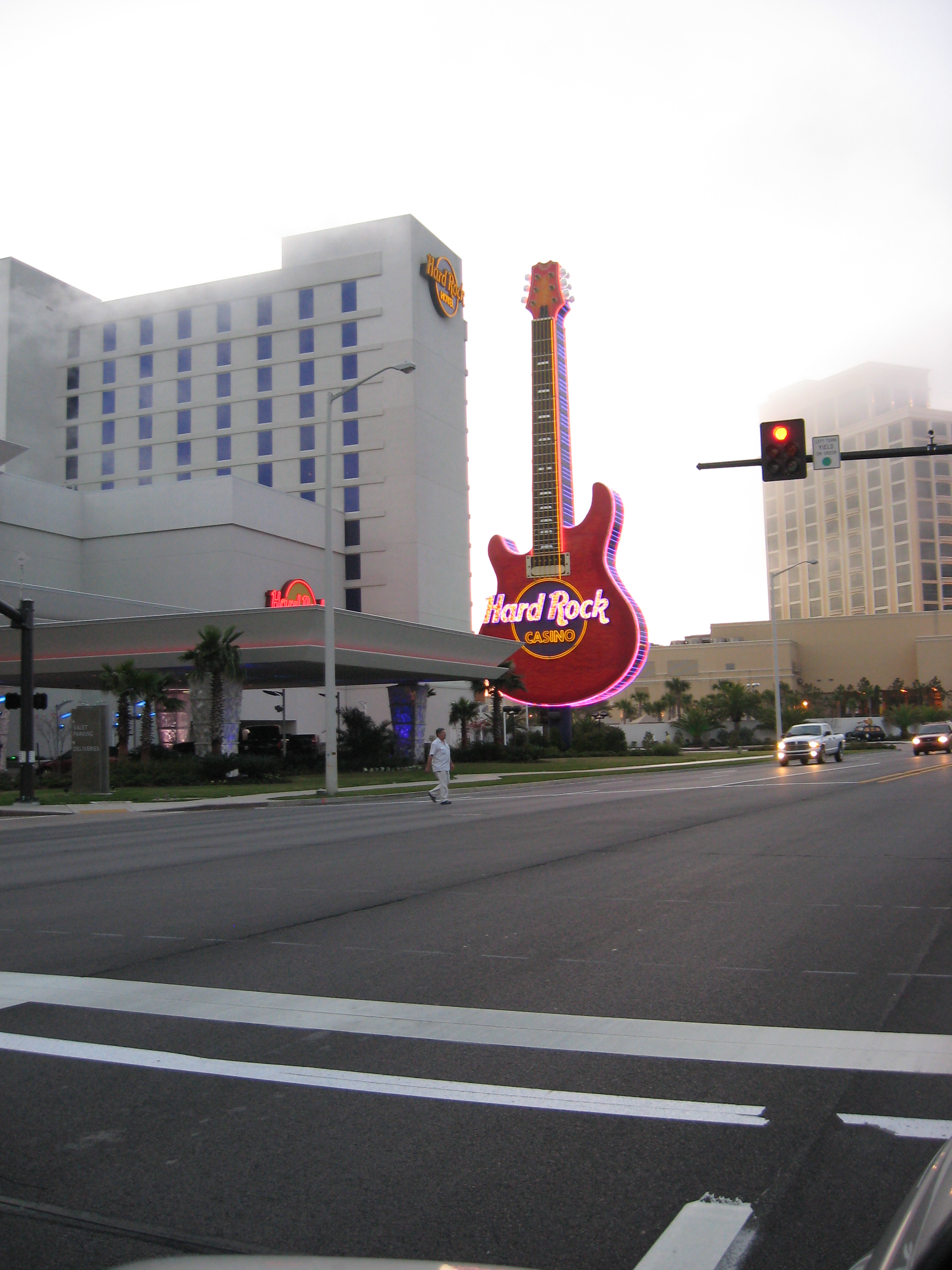
Exterior view at sunset (December 2008)

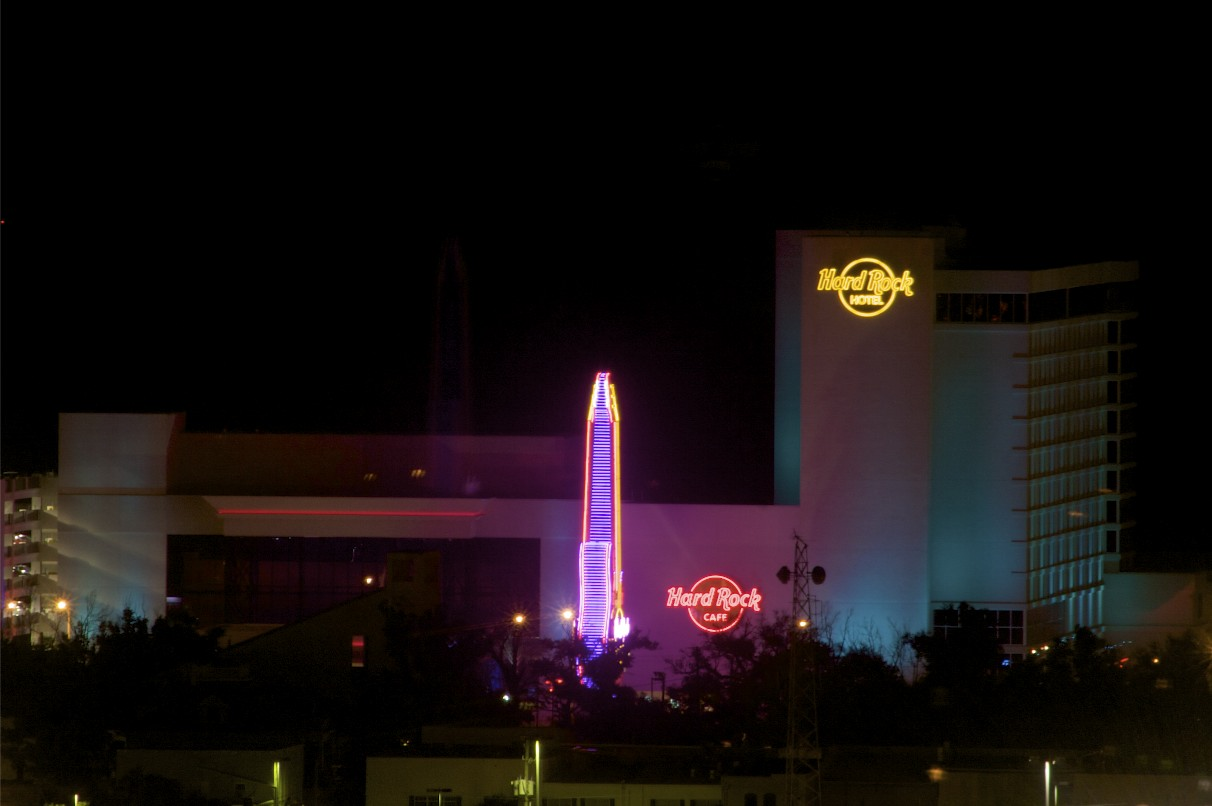
At night (April 2008)

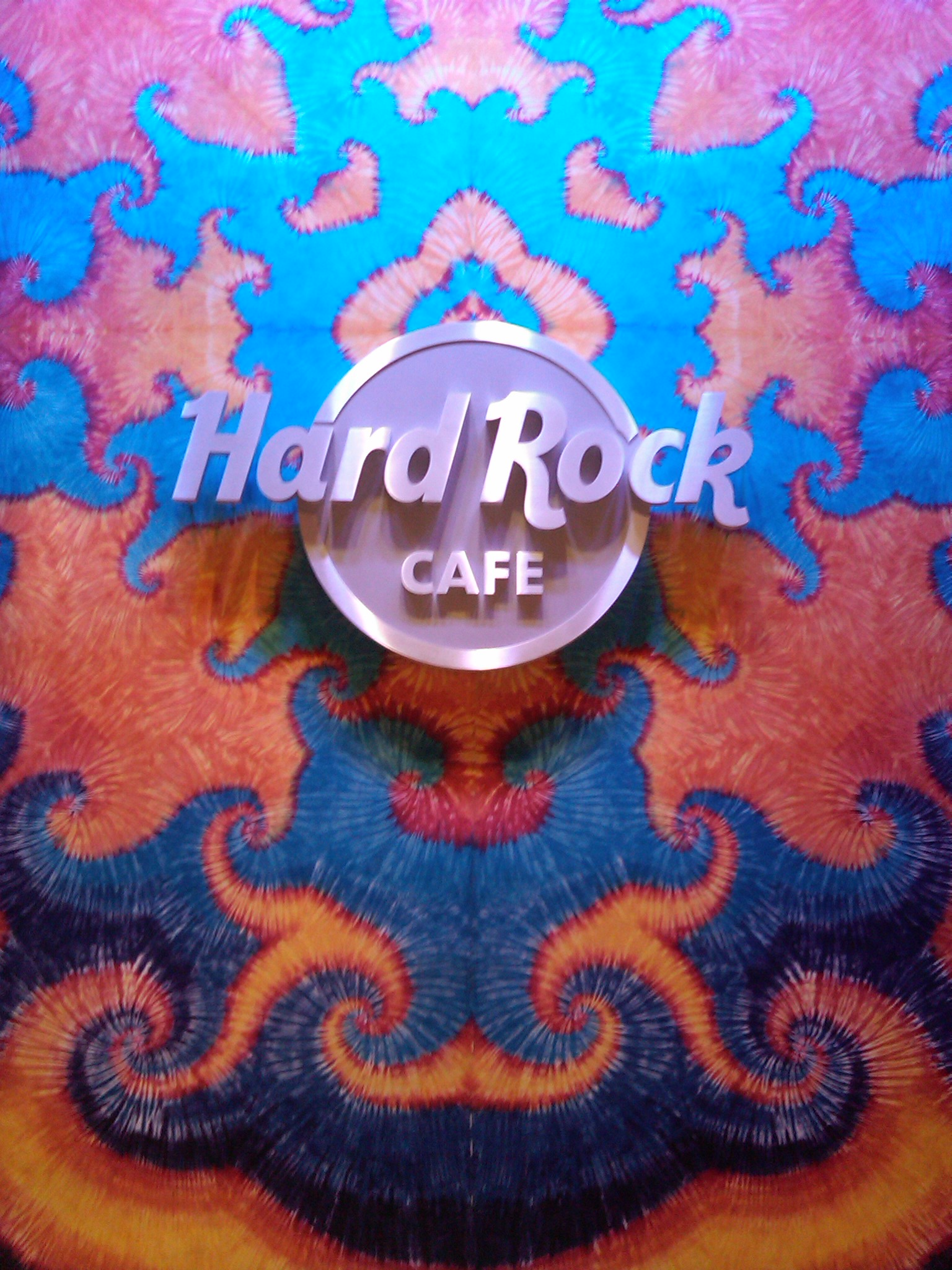
Cafe logo (January 2010)

== See also ==
- List of integrated resorts
- Hard Rock Beach Club Choctaw
- Hard Rock Hotel & Casino Tulsa
- Seminole Hard Rock Hotel & Casino Hollywood
- Hard Rock Live (Hollywood, FL)
- Hard Rock Hotel and Casino (Las Vegas)
