= MKF =

MKF, mkf, or variants can refer to:

- Mushkaf railway station, a train station in Mushkaf village, Balochistan province, Pakistan
- Miya language, a language spoken in Nigeria, by ISO 639 code
- Mongolian Kendo Federation, which is part of the International Kendo Federation
- Monkey Knife Fight, a daily fantasy sports company
- Malaysia Kabaddi Federation, which hosted the 2019 Kabaddi World Cup

== See also ==
- MKF convoys, or convoys of fast ships from the United Kingdom to the Mediterranean during World War II
- mkfs, a Unix-like command to format a block of memory into a filesystem
- MKF-6 (multispectral camera), produced in East Germany
