= Freedom Center (Chicago) =

Chicago Tribune newspaper-printing facility

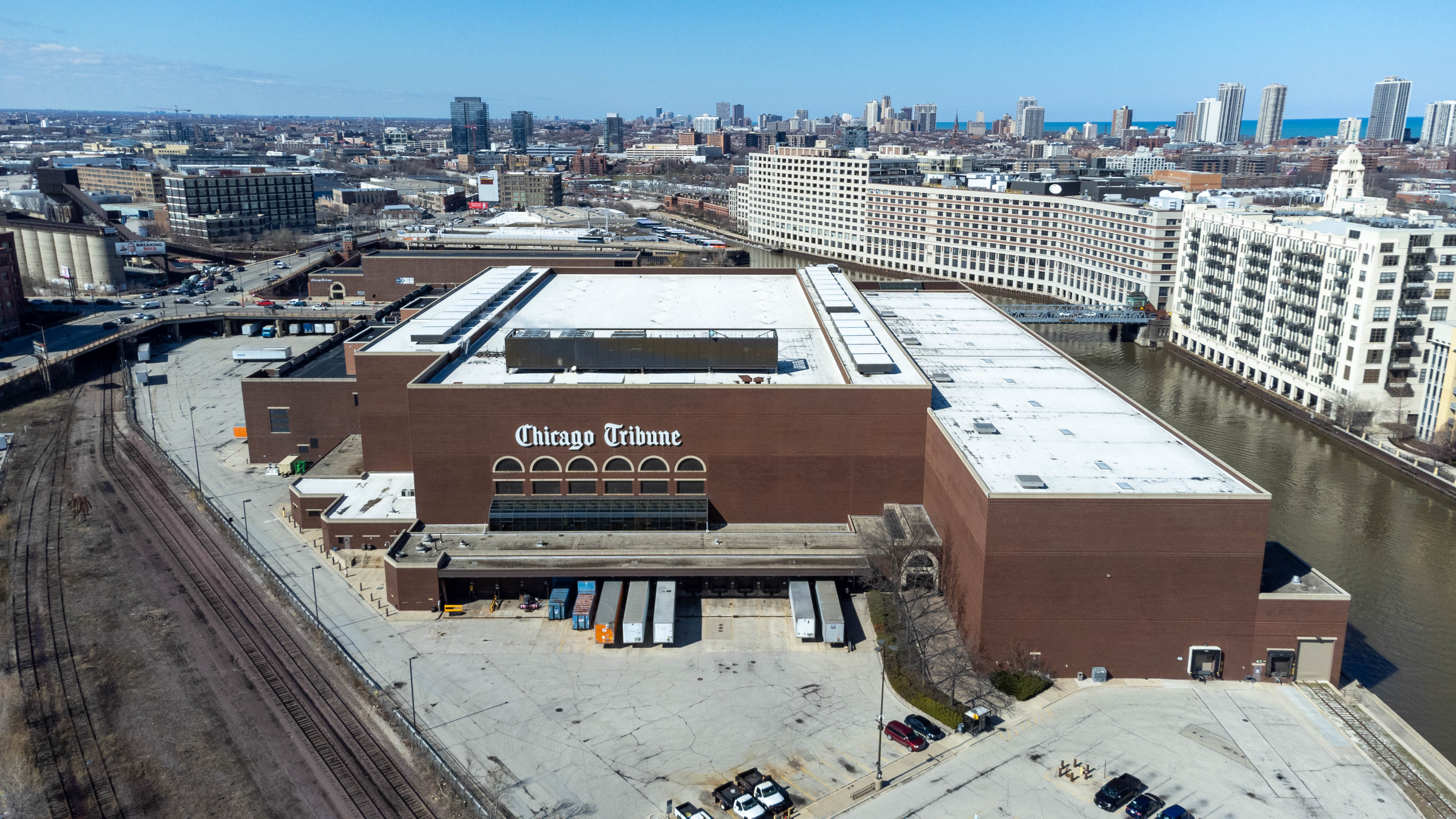
- Freedom Center in 2022
- Alternative names: Chicago Tribune Publishing Center

General information
- Location: 777 West Chicago Avenue; Chicago, Illinois; 60654
- Coordinates: 41.8952774°N 87.6458309°W
- Current tenants: Chicago Tribune
- Groundbreaking: September 1979
- Completed: September 1982
- Closed: May 2024
- Cost: $185,000,000
- Owner: Oak Street Real Estate Capital

Technical details
- Floor area: 659,000 sq ft

Design and construction
- Architects: Skidmore Owings & Merrill

Freedom Center, also known as the Chicago Tribune Publishing Center, was the printing plant and a later headquarters for the Chicago Tribune, as well as the printing facility for other publications such as the Chicago Sun-Times located in Chicago, Illinois, United States. It closed May 2024 and was demolished to make way for Bally's Chicago Casino.

== History ==
=== Development and construction ===
On June 20, 1979, the Chicago Tribune announced plans for a $150 million printing plant, to replace their former printing facility at Tribune Tower. The site was to be located in the River North district, right off of the Chicago River. Architecture firm Skidmore Owings & Merrill designed the building. The Tribune acquired the 21-acre parcel of land in 1967. The goal of completion at the beginning of the project was the fall of 1982. The building would be 697,000 sq ft, and contain 10 Goss Metroliner offset presses, with space for two more. The presses could run 75,000 papers per hour, versus 60,000 at Tribune Tower. The maximum issue would also be 144 pages, versus 112 at Tribune Tower. Ground was broken on the building in September 1979.

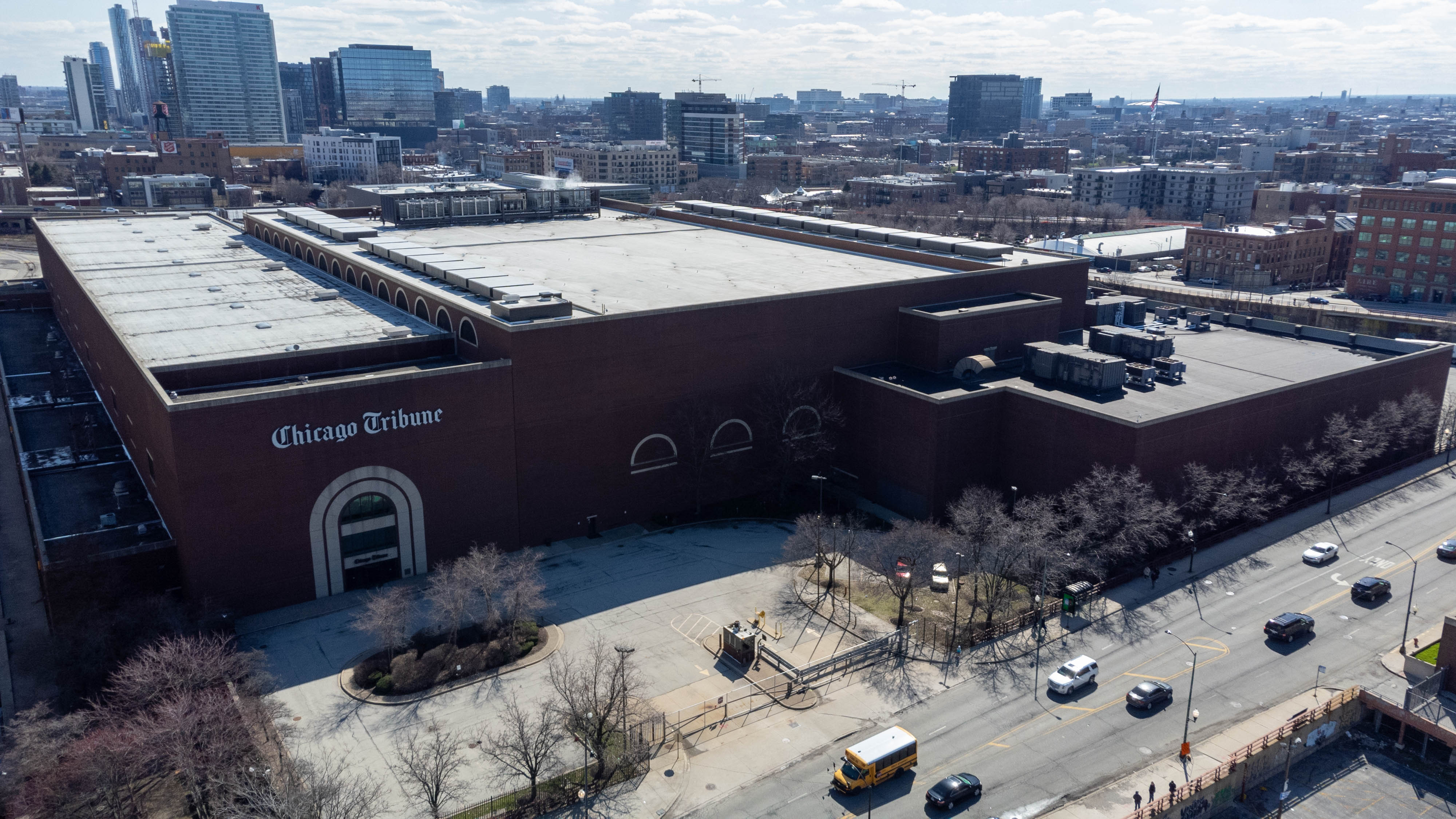
Freedom Center looking south in 2022

Later during construction, the anticipated price was changed to $185 Million. On July 15, 1981, the Chicago Tribune announced that the name of the facility would be "Freedom Center". The name was suggested by the environment editor at the time, Casey Bukro. Partial production of the facility was expected to be operational by September 1981, with full production capacity by September 1982.

=== Post-construction ===
Starting on July 18, 1985, Chicago Typographical Union No. 16, Chicago Web Printing Pressman's Union No. 7, and Chicago Mailers Union No. 2 all went on strike due to the Freedom Center's technological upgrades making a number of positions obsolete and the union wanting those roles restored in some manner. On January 4, 1986, a rally took place during the strike, and violence occurred. The violence broke out at about 5:00 AM when protesters started to throw rocks at delivery trucks leaving the plant. After police tried to use horses to separate the crowd, bricks started to be thrown. The crowd was assumed to be around 10,000 people, with 100 police present. There were 10 people with minor injuries, 35 were arrested, one police officer was injured, 5 Tribune employees were injured, and several delivery trucks were damaged as well.

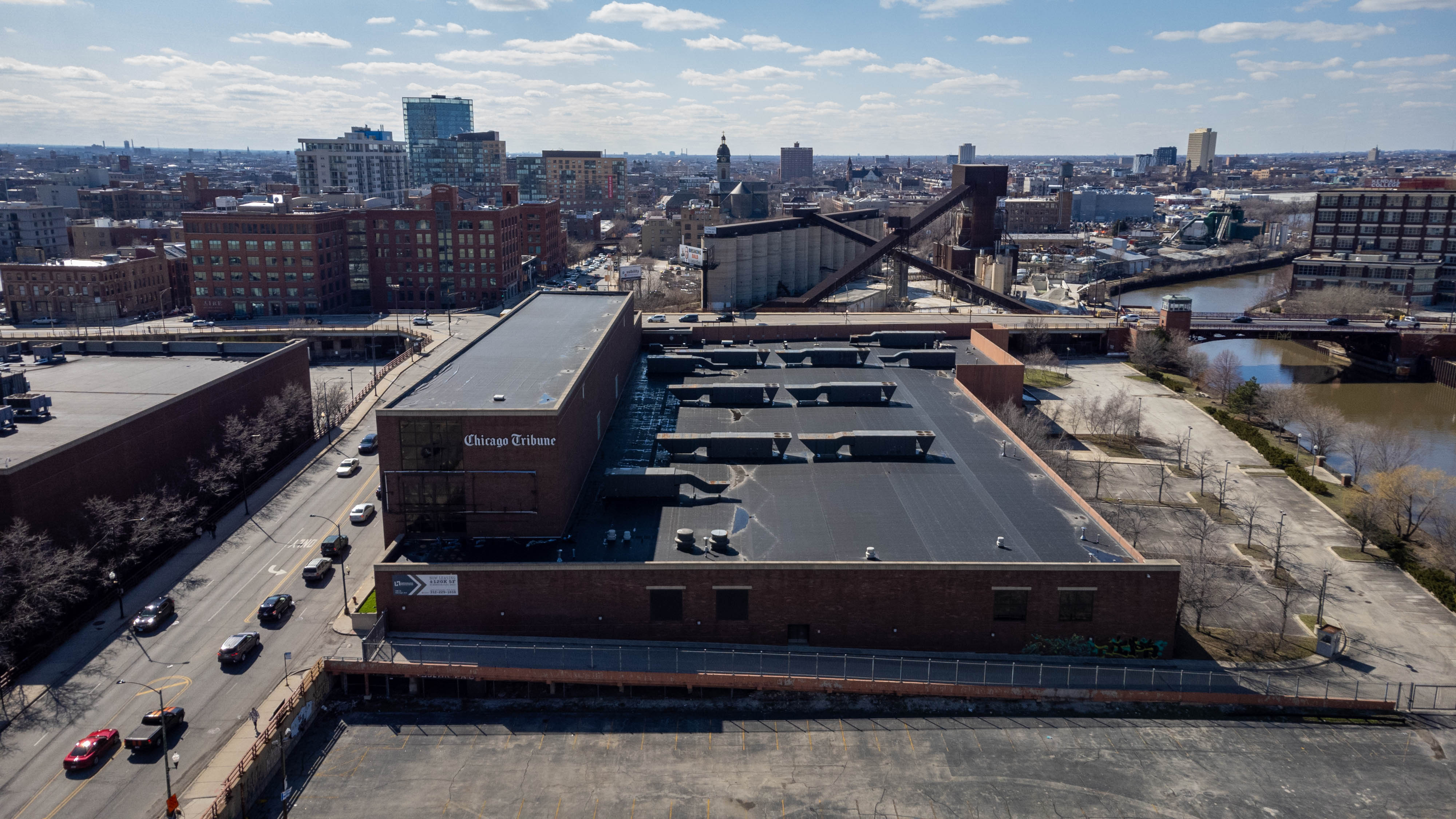
Freedom Center North in 2022

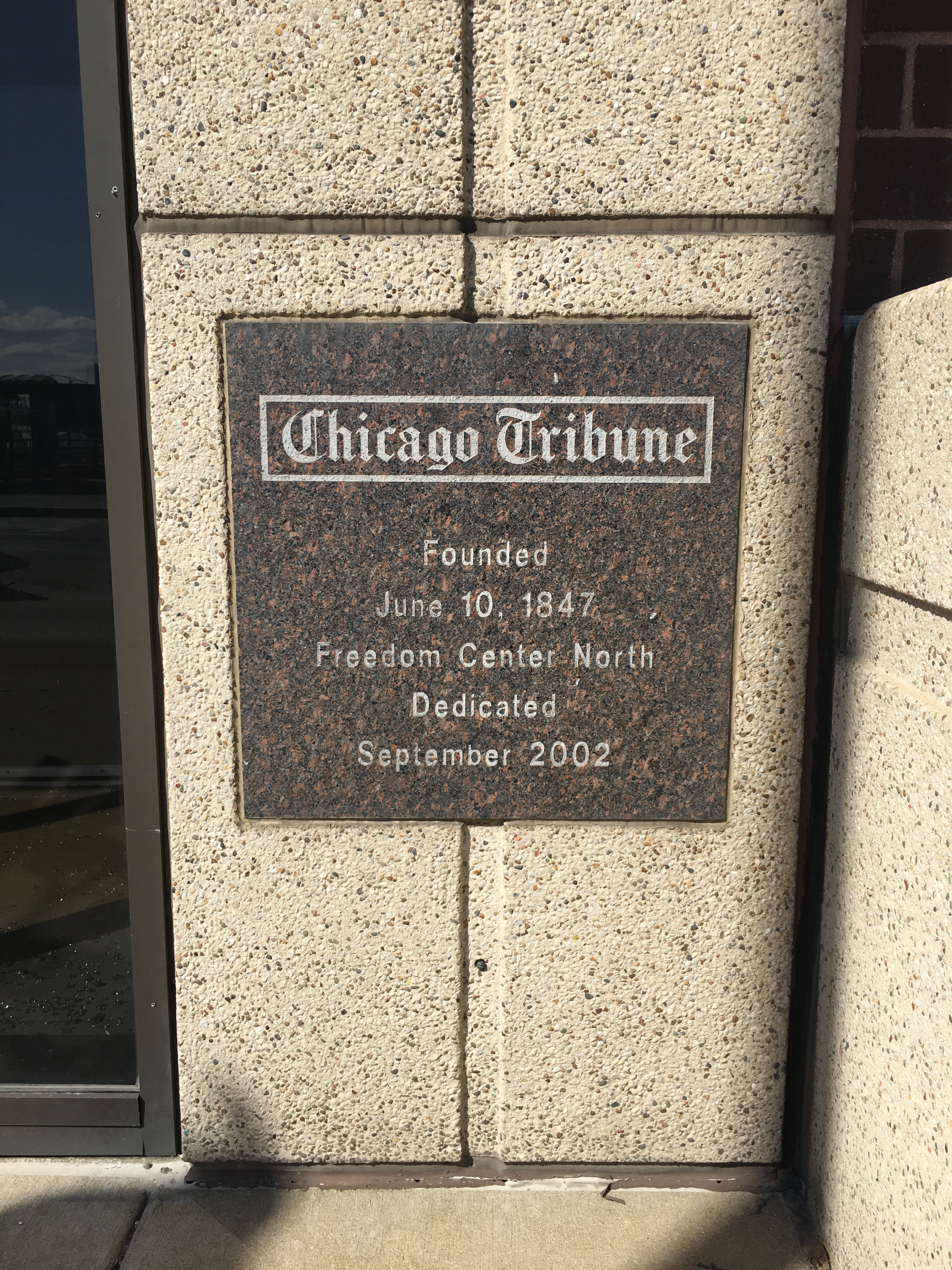
An inscription on the Side of Freedom Center North, a packaging addition opened in 2002

In September 2002, a new 115,000 sq. ft. distribution facility known as Freedom Center North was opened across from the original Freedom Center.

In 2014, when Tribune Media split up their newspaper division in to Tribune Publishing, Tribune Media kept their real estate assets, including the Freedom Center.

In February 2019, the 37-acre site was put up for sale. That year, the property was bought by Nexstar Media as part of their wider acquisition of Tribune Media for $4.1 billion. The Chicago Tribune held a lease on the site until 2023, with two 10-year options for extension. Also included in the lease was a relocation clause.

In January 2021, the Chicago Tribune offices and newsroom moved out of One Prudential Plaza and relocated to Freedom Center. This was only three years after their exit from Tribune Tower.

== Re-development ==
=== River District ===
On September 6, 2017, Tribune Media announced plans to demolish the then vacant Freedom Center North. They would turn it into a mixed-use development consisting of 1.2 million square feet of offices and a 310-unit residential building. Riverside Investment & Development were to be the developers of the project. On April 19, 2021, it was reported that the plans were dropped.

On October 4, 2017, Tribune Media announced plans to turn Freedom Center into a mixed-use development with 18 buildings. It would comprise about 9 million square feet of commercial and residential space. The plan aimed to be home to 19,000 jobs, and have 5,900 residential units. This development was planned to fit in with the aforementioned Freedom Center North Development. This plan was canceled after the 37-acre site was put up for sale.

=== Bally's Casino ===
As part of the Chicago casino proposals request for proposals, Bally's Corporation proposed to put a casino on the land that Freedom Center sits on. The casino would completely demolish all buildings on the site and replace it with a $1 billion casino development. It would contain 2700 slot machines, 95 table games, a suite-only hotel, with 100 suites, and an outdoor music venue with space for 1000 people. After a 20% return on investment, Bally's proposed that they would go on to have a $600 million expansion. There would be a total of 4000 gaming seats with the expansion, a new 400-room hotel, a 3000-seat indoor venue, and a 20,000-square-foot exhibition space. On 22 March 2022, Mayor Lori Lightfoot announced that there were three finalists of the five proposals. The Bally's Freedom Center proposal was one of them. On May 5 2022, Lightfoot announced that she had chosen the Chicago Tribune Freedom Center Bally's Proposal as her selection. After receiving approval from the mayor, the proposal has to go on to receive a majority vote from the City Council and Illinois Gaming Board. The Chicago Tribune did not announce intentions to relocate their printing facilities and headquarters.

Bally's purchased the Freedom Center site from Nexstar for $200 million in November 2022, and then promptly sold the property for the same price to Oak Street Real Estate Capital in a leaseback transaction.

In February 2024, Tribune Publishing announced it would layoff about 200 employees from the Freedom Center as the printing plant closes and operations move to the offices and printing facility of The Daily Herald in Schaumburg. Under the building sale agreement, the company had until July to completely leave the property in anticipation of demolition and the new casino to open sometime in 2026. Demolition began in 2024 and was completed in early 2025.

=== Universal Horror Unleashed: Chicago ===
In June 2025, Universal announced the city of Chicago would be the second Universal Horror Unleashed location and the first Universal attraction in the Midwest. Construction began by April 2026 after Onni Group leased the former Freedom Center North building to Universal for the project. The attraction is tentatively scheduled to open in 2027.
