= Arapahoe Park =

Horse-racing track in Colorado, USA

Coordinates: 39°37′46″N 104°41′09″W

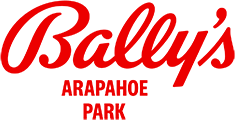
- Interactive map of Arapahoe Park
- Location: Arapahoe County, Colorado
- Owned by: Bally's Corporation
- Race type: Flat racing

Bally's Arapahoe Park is a horse-racing track in Arapahoe County, Colorado on the outskirts of Aurora, owned and operated by Bally's Corporation. Located at 26000 East Quincy Avenue, Arapahoe Park hosts Thoroughbred, Quarter Horse, Paint Horse and Arabian horse racing.

The racing season generally begins in mid-May and continues through the late spring into the summer, wrapping up in mid-August. The track is home to the Mile High Futurity and the Mile High Derby, both quarter horse stakes races with final purses of over $100,000. For Thoroughbreds, the meet's marque race is the Gold Rush Futurity, a 2 year old stakes race going six furlongs for $100,000 in purse monies. Arapahoe Park also hosts four graded stakes races, all for Arabian horses.
