= Bally's Quad Cities =

Casino hotel in Rock Island, Illinois

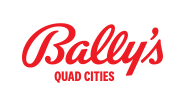

- Interactive map of Bally's Quad Cities
- Location: Rock Island, Illinois, United States; 777 Bally Boulevard; 41.459444°N 90.613611°W
- Opened: December 1, 2008
- No. of rooms: 205
- Gaming space: 42,000 square feet (3,900 m^{2})
- Notable restaurants: Bally Bet Sportsbook & Bar
- Casino type: Land-based
- Owner: Gaming and Leisure Properties
- Operating license holder: Bally's Corporation
- Previous names: Jumer's Casino & Hotel
- Public transit access: Quad Cities MetroLINK
- Website: casinos.ballys.com/quad-cities

Bally's Quad Cities, formerly Jumer's Casino & Hotel, is a casino hotel in Rock Island, Illinois, part of the Quad Cities area. It is owned and operated by Bally's Corporation. The casino has about 42,000 square feet (3,900 m^{2}) of gaming space, with almost 800 slot machines, 13 table games, and a live poker room. It is one of the largest land-based casinos in the state of Illinois.

Bally's was voted the Quad Cities' #1 casino according to a poll conducted by the Quad City Times.

== History ==
A view of Jumer's Hotel

In June 2002, the Illinois House of Representatives gives Jumer's Casino Rock Island permission to move away from downtown Rock Island to a site near the intersection of Interstate 280 and Illinois 92. In October 2007, Jumer's Casino Rock Island broke ground on a $151 million land-based casino, hotel and banquet center, and on December 1, 2008, Jumer's opened its new casino and hotel in southwest Rock Island. The 42,000-square-foot casino has about 800 slots and 13 table games as well as a live poker room and a high-limit slots area. The complex includes a 205-room hotel with 11 luxury suites, an event center, Bally Bet Sportsbook, a nightclub and four restaurants.

In 2011, the Jumer family sold the property to Delaware North for $180 million.

In June 2021, Delaware North sold Jumer's to Bally's Corporation for $120 million. The property was rebranded as Bally's Quad Cities in September 2021.

Gaming and Leisure Properties purchased the real estate of Bally's Quad Cities in a leaseback transaction in April 2022.
