= Universal Horror Unleashed =

Attraction chain from Universal Destinations & Experiences

- Official logo

Las Vegas
- Area: Area15
- Coordinates: 36.132175°N 115.180782°W
- Status: Operating
- Opening date: August 14, 2025; 13 months ago

Chicago
- Area: Freedom Center North
- Coordinates: 41.895277°N 87.645830°W
- Status: Under construction

Ride statistics
- Attraction type: Year-round event/ Scream Park
- Designer: Universal Creative
- Theme: Haunted houses
- Owner: NBCUniversal (Comcast)
- Operator: Universal Destinations & Experiences
- Website: Official website

Universal Horror Unleashed is an attraction chain of self-guiding, walk-through haunted attractions in Las Vegas, Nevada, and upcoming to Chicago, Illinois. The Las Vegas attraction chain encompasses an area of 110,000 square feet (2.5 acres) and is located within Area15, an entertainment complex, while the Chicago version will be located at the former Freedom Center North building. Announced in January 2023, it is the second horror-themed experience from Universal Destinations & Experiences, after Halloween Horror Nights. The Las Vegas installation opened on August 14, 2025, while the Chicago installation is scheduled to open in 2027.

== Las Vegas, Nevada ==
Concept art

In January 2023, Universal announced a new "horror experience" called Universal Horror Unleashed, which serves as the anchor tenant of the Vegas Immersive District, a 35-acre expansion of Area15, in Las Vegas, Nevada. Unlike Universal's seasonal Halloween Horror Nights events, it is a permanent and year-round fixture, occupying a 110,000-square-foot (2.5-acre) space. On March 8, 2023, NBCUniversal's theme park division Universal Parks & Resorts changed their name to Universal Destinations & Experiences. Construction began in October 2023, with the walls erected by December 18, 2023. The attraction consists of four haunted houses based on The Exorcist: Believer (Note: The intellectual property rights are owned by Blumhouse Productions), The Texas Chain Saw Massacre (Note: The intellectual property rights are owned by Vortex Inc.), "Universal Monsters", and "Scarecrow: The Reaping". On February 10, 2025, Area15 announced their Vegas Immersive District is 60% pre-leased, including Universal Horror Unleashed. On February 19, 2025, Universal announced the attraction would open on August 14, 2025. The attraction includes "Jack's Alley", a bar and entertainment center themed to Jack the Clown. A week before its opening it was announced that haunted house composers Midnight Syndicate had created an original score for the attraction.

On September 29, 2025, it was announced that Universal Horror Unleashed hosted a holiday experience called Krampus and Kin from November 15, 2025 to January 3, 2026. On March 31, 2026, it was announced that Universal Horror Unleashed hosted an Easter-themed experience called Feaster Grievings from April 1 to May 3, 2026. In June 2026, Del Wynegar, assistant director of entertainment for Universal Horror Unleashed, announced that the attraction would have original characters tied to Las Vegas.

== Chicago, Illinois ==
Concept art

In June 2025, Universal announced the city of Chicago would be the second Universal Horror Unleashed location and the first Universal attraction in the Midwest. Construction began by April 2026 after Onni Group leased the former Freedom Center North building to Universal for the project. The attraction is set to receive $7 million in Illinois state tax credits, and employ 400 workers. The attraction is tentatively scheduled to open in 2027.

== See also ==
- Universal's Halloween Horror Nights, the first horror–themed experience from Universal Destinations & Experiences
- Dark Universe, a Universal Monsters–themed land at Universal Epic Universe
- Universal Orlando's Horror Make-Up Show, a Universal Monsters–themed live show at Universal Studios Florida
