= Bally's Kansas City =

Riverboat casino in Kansas City, Missouri

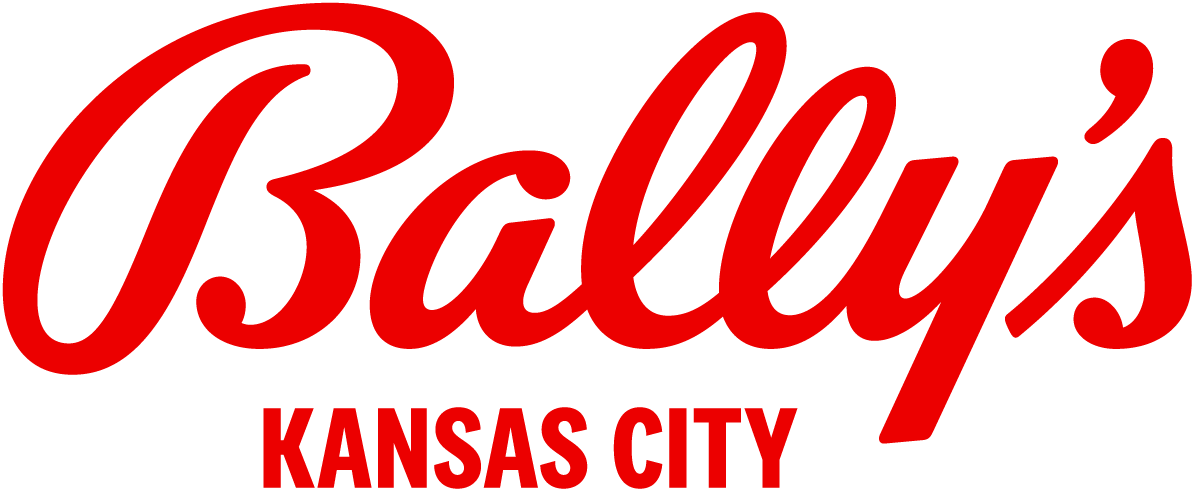

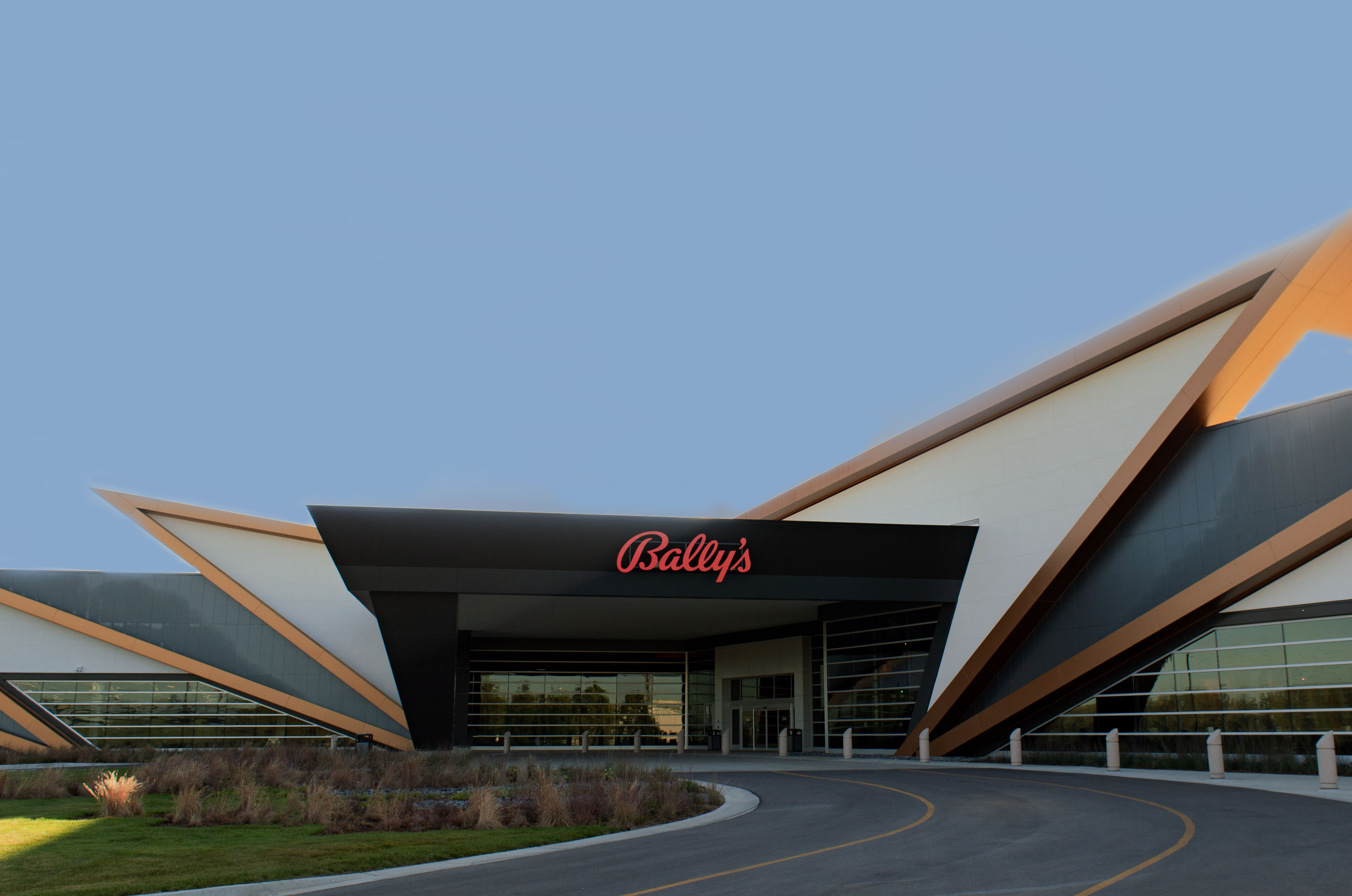
- Bally's Kansas City in October 2023
- Interactive map of Bally's Kansas City
- Location: Kansas City, Missouri; 1800 E Front St; 39°07′19″N 94°33′46″W
- Gaming space: 45,300 sq ft (4,210 m^{2})
- Notable restaurants: Chickie's & Pete's; 1800 Noodle Bar
- Casino type: Riverboat
- Owner: Gaming and Leisure Properties
- Operating license holder: Bally's Corporation
- Previous names: Hilton Flamingo (1996–2001); Isle of Capri Kansas City (2001–2020); Casino KC (2020–2021)
- Website: casinos.ballys.com/kansas-city/

Bally's Kansas City is a riverboat casino in Kansas City, Missouri. It is owned by Gaming and Leisure Properties and operated by Bally's Corporation.

== History ==
In 1996, Hilton Hotels opened the casino as the Hilton Flamingo. The casino is located near, but not on, the Missouri River. Instead, a 5-acre lake was constructed and the facility was built to float on that at a cost of $110 million. Donald Trump's Trump Entertainment Resorts attempted to purchase the property in 1999 for $15 million. He applied for a gaming license from the Missouri Gaming Commission; however, the gaming commission requested additional information. The license was not granted by the contractual deadline of August 31, causing the deal to fall through. Trump withdrew his license application in November 1999. In June 2000, Hilton sold the property to Isle of Capri Casinos for $33.5 million. The name was changed in March 2001 to Isle of Capri Kansas City. Later, in 2017, Eldorado Resorts bought Isle of Capri Casinos, including the Kansas City location.

In July 2020, Twin River Worldwide Holdings bought the property along with Lady Luck Casino Vicksburg from Eldorado for a total of $230 million, and renamed the property as Casino KC. Twin River then purchased the Bally's casino brand from Caesars Entertainment, changed its own name to Bally's Corporation, and announced plans to rebrand most of its casinos. As part of this rebranding, Casino KC became Bally's Kansas City in August 2021. In 2023, Bally's completed a $50-million renovation of the property, including a new exterior and additional retail and dining space.

Bally's sold the land and buildings of Bally's Kansas City in 2024 to Gaming and Leisure Properties for $275 million in a sale-and-leaseback deal.

== Facility ==
Bally's Kansas City has over 900 slot machines and table games in its 45,300 sq ft (4,210 m^{2}) square feet of gaming space. Unlike competitors in the Kansas City market, Bally's does not have a hotel on site.

Restaurants include Chickie's & Pete's, the 1800 Noodle Bar, Best Odds Quick Bites, Tiki Bar, and Celebrity Casino & Lounge.

== See also ==
- List of casinos in Missouri
