= Bally's Vicksburg =

Riverboat casino and hotel in Mississippi

Coordinates: 32.294313°N 90.914736°W

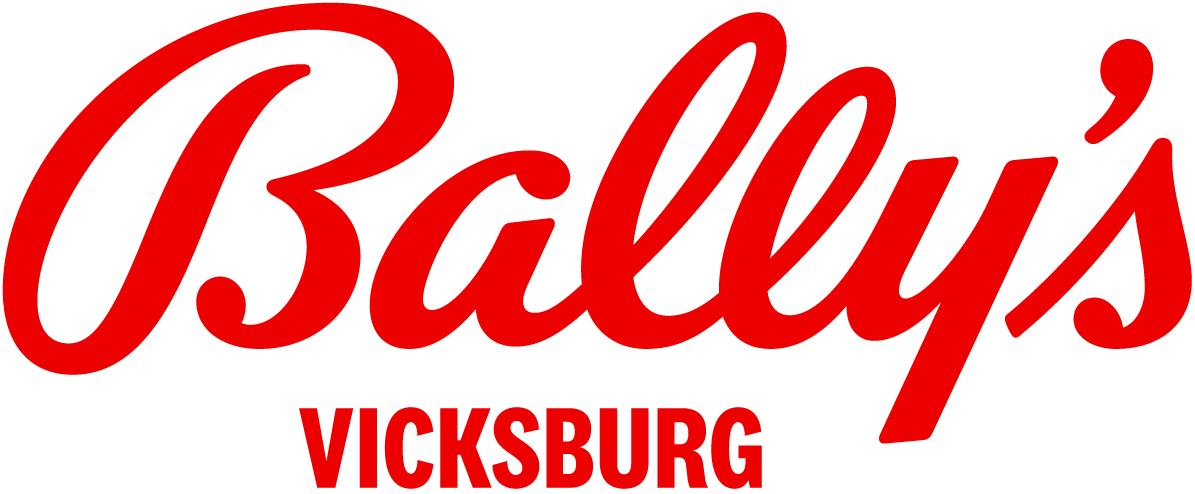
- Interactive map of Bally's Vicksburg
- Location: Vicksburg, Mississippi
- Opened: July 12, 1994
- No. of rooms: 89
- Gaming space: 25,000 sq ft (2,300 m^{2})
- Casino type: Riverboat casino
- Owner: Bally's Corporation
- Previous names: Rainbow Casino (1994–2012); Lady Luck Casino Vicksburg (2012–2020); Casino Vicksburg (2020–2021)
- Website: casinos.ballys.com/vicksburg

Bally's Vicksburg is a riverboat casino and hotel in Vicksburg, Mississippi. It is owned and operated by Bally's Corporation. It has 25,000 square feet (2,300 m^{2}) of gaming space and 89 hotel rooms.

== History ==
The project was initiated by the Rainbow Casino Corporation (RCC), made up of John A. Barrett and Leigh Seippel. Hospitality Franchise Systems agreed to provide $7.5 million in financing, and to franchise a hotel at the property under its Days Inn brand. Six Flags agreed to build a 10-acre theme park named Pennants. United Gaming (later known as Alliance Gaming, and then Bally Technologies) signed on to manage the casino.

The Rainbow Casino opened on July 12, 1994, with 574 slot machines and 28 table games. United Gaming took a 45 percent ownership stake on the day it opened. It took a controlling stake the following year, after RCC failed to finance elements of the casino that it was responsible for.

The hotel, owned by AmeriHost, opened in May 1995, and the company called it "the most upscale Days Inn anywhere". It was rebranded as an AmeriHost Inn by 2000, and in 2002 it was sold to AmeriHost's former chairman, Michael P. Holtz.

The theme park, renamed as Funtricity Entertainment Park, also opened in May 1995. Six Flags designed it as the flagship in a new chain of entertainment centers, targeted at markets too small to support a full-size park; within two years, though, the concept was reportedly put on hold. The park closed in 1998, and Alliance bought the site for $500,000 and adapted its main building for use as a concert venue.

A casino expansion was completed in 1999, increasing the number of slot machines from 725 to over 1,000.

In 1999, United Gaming put the property, along with its other casino in Nevada, on the market, to help pay down corporate debts, but no satisfactory offers were received.

Bally put the Rainbow back on the market in 2006. In 2010, a sale was finally made to Isle of Capri Casinos for $80 million. Isle of Capri rebranded the property under its Lady Luck name in November 2012.

In March 2018, Eldorado Resorts (which had acquired Isle of Capri Casinos in 2017) agreed to sell the property to Churchill Downs Inc., owner of the neighboring Riverwalk Casino, for $51 million. The sale was canceled, however, as a result of inquiries from antitrust regulators. In July 2019, Eldorado agreed instead to sell the property to Twin River Worldwide Holdings, along with the Isle of Capri Casino Kansas City, for a total of $230 million. The deal was made to help finance Eldorado's pending acquisition of Caesars Entertainment. The sale to Twin River closed in July 2020, and the property was renamed as Casino Vicksburg.

Twin River then purchased the Bally's casino brand from Caesars Entertainment, changed its own name to Bally's Corporation, and announced plans to rebrand most of its casinos. As part of this rebranding, Casino Vicksburg became Bally's Vicksburg in August 2021.

== See also ==
- List of casinos in Mississippi
