= McDonald's Park =

Planned stadium in Chicago, Illinois, US

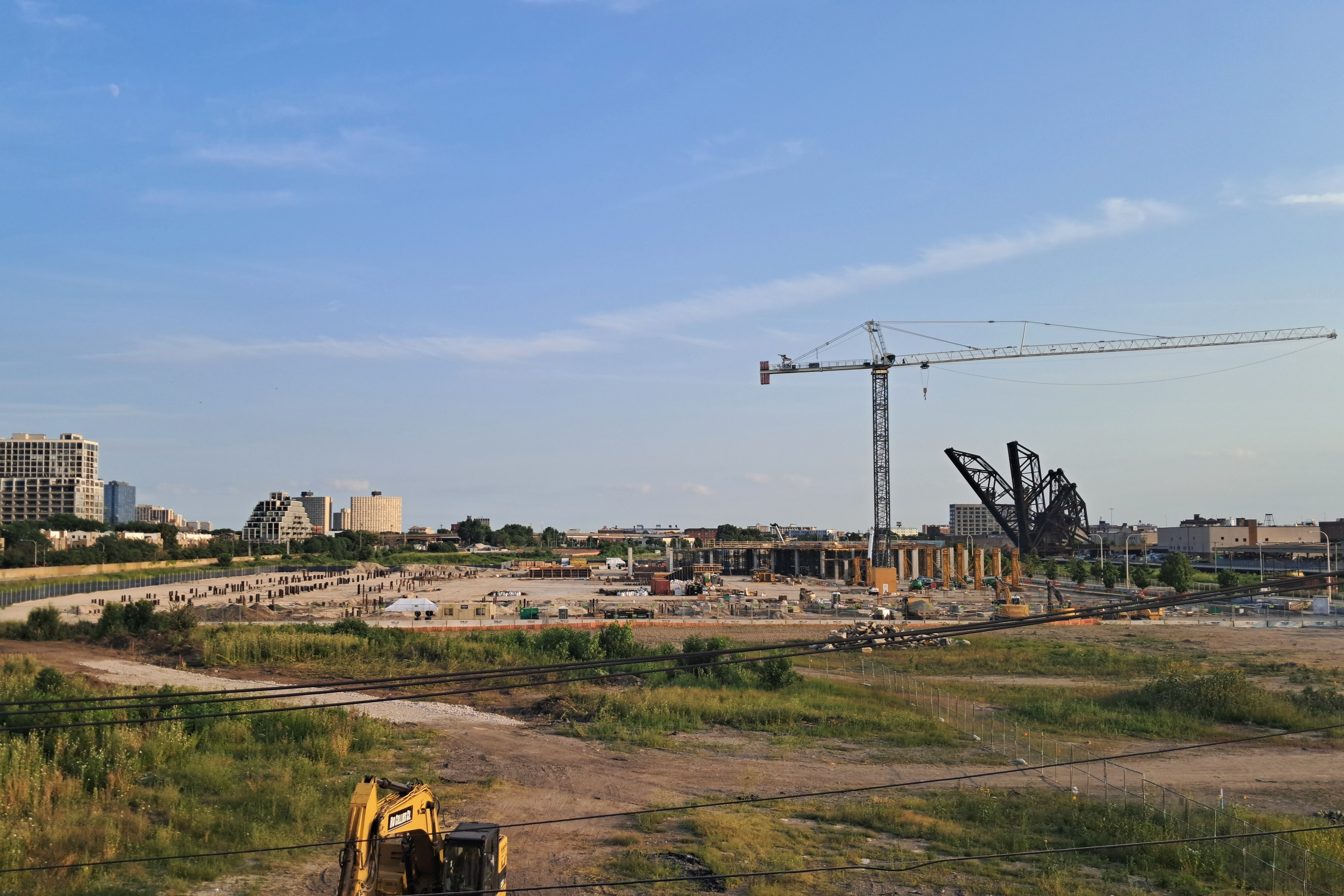
- Construction site of McDonald's Park
- Interactive map of McDonald's Park
- Location: Chicago, Illinois, U.S.
- Coordinates: 41°51′53″N 87°37′56″W
- Owner: Chicago Fire FC
- Capacity: 22,000
- Public transit: CTA bus routes 12, 18, 24, 29, 62, 146; Orange Line; Green Line; Red Line; Metra

Construction
- Groundbreaking: March 3, 2026
- Cost: $750 million
- Architect: Gensler

Tenant
- Chicago Fire FC (MLS) (2028–future)

McDonald's Park is a soccer-specific stadium under construction in Chicago, Illinois. It is planned to be the home of Chicago Fire FC of Major League Soccer (MLS). The site is located at The 78, a plot of land in South Loop from Roosevelt Road south to 16th Street and Clark Street west to the Chicago River.

== History ==
Rendering prior to the naming rights deal with McDonald's

On June 3, 2025, Fire FC owner Joe Mansueto announced plans for a new, privately funded, soccer-specific stadium and entertainment district located along the Chicago River just south of Roosevelt Road. The stadium will be the anchor tenant of The 78 – a mixed-use development that will eventually include restaurants, retail, office space, and residential buildings, along with green space and an extension of the Chicago Riverwalk. The planned seating capacity for the stadium will be approximately 22,000 for Fire matches, with an increased capacity for concerts and other events. While the stadium is being built as a soccer-specific stadium, the facility will be designed with the idea of being a mixed-use facility to host year-round events. Mansueto said the stadium design will reflect Chicago, and will be evocative of Chicago history. The facade will be brick, reminiscent of the warehouses and manufacturing buildings in the city. The stadium will be designed by the architecture firm Gensler. The construction plans for the stadium were approved by the Chicago Plan Commission in September 2025.

The groundbreaking ceremony for the stadium took place on March 3, 2026. The new stadium is expected to open in 2028.

On May 13, 2026, Chicago Fire FC and McDonald's, whose headquarters are in Chicago, announced a naming rights deal for the new stadium, which will be called McDonald's Park.

== Transit ==
The stadium is near Roosevelt station (CTA Red, Orange, and Green ‘L’ trains) and CTA bus routes 12, 18, 24, 29, 62 and 146. Two Metra stops are within walking distance: LaSalle Street Station and Museum Campus/11th Street station. The site will be accessible via water taxi.

== Photo gallery ==
McDonald's Park under construction

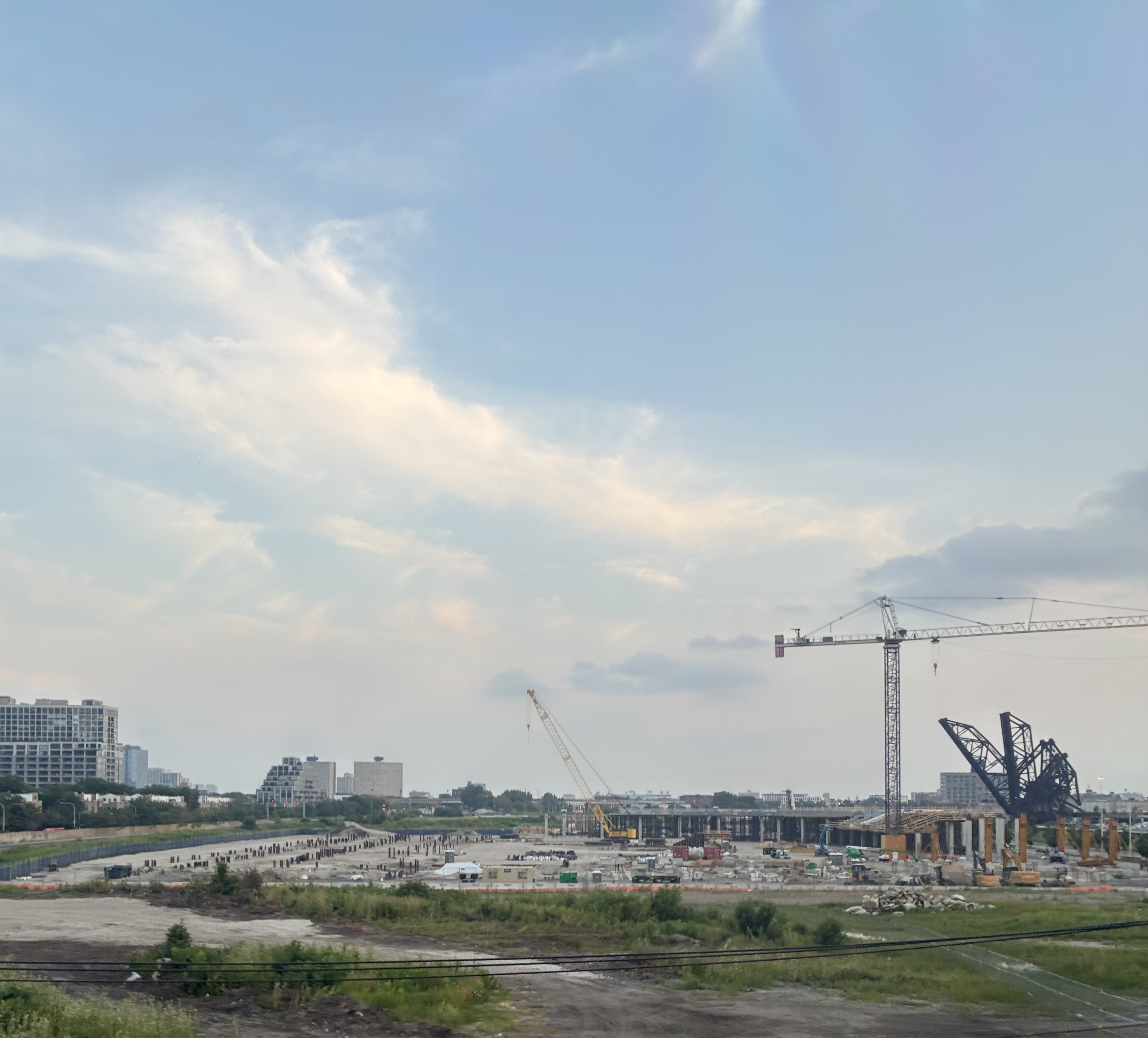
McDonald's Park under construction

McDonald's Park under construction
