= Floating casino =

A floating casino is a casino on board a ship, often permanently moored. This may be to advantage of less restrictive laws restricting gambling either on a vessel, or outside a territorial boundary.

They include:

- Gambling ship
- Riverboat casino, a term used in the US
