= Monkey Knife Fight =

Monkey Knife Fight was a daily fantasy sports (DFS) platform that offers daily contests in a range of professional sports and eSports leagues. Users enter simple fantasy contests on its website and win money if they predict the outcome correctly. Contests are available for NFL, NBA, MLB NHL, Esports, Golf, Soccer, WNBA, and NASCAR events.

Monkey Knife Fight was the third-largest DFS company in North America, behind FanDuel and DraftKings. It was owned by Bally's Corporation.

== History ==
The company was founded in 2018 by Bill Asher, and experienced rapid growth.

Monkey Knife Fight acquired rival FantasyDraft in September 2020, which included the company absorbing all of FantasyDraft's assets and entire user base.

In March 2021, Bally's Corporation acquired Monkey Knife Fight for up to $90 million in stock.

On February 28, 2023, Monkey Knife Fight shut down all operation due to post-acquisition mismanagement by Bally's.

Monkey Knife Fight used to operate in 37 U.S. states, Washington, D.C., and Canada.

== Fantasy contests ==
Monkey Knife Fight offers fantasy contests for multiple sports, and unlike traditional team-building fantasy sports games, MKF offers player-specific contests. The most popular games on the site are “More or Less” contests, where users predict whether a player's performance will be more or less than a certain predicted statistic.

The website also offers games such as “Rapid Fire” (where users pick a winner in two matchup categories), “Touchdown Dance” (users choose players to exceed a chosen total touchdowns goal), and “Stat Shootout” (users choose a team of players that will accumulate the most of the statistic type they choose).

== Partnerships ==
The NFLPA holds a minority stake in the company including a marketing agreement between the two organizations.

Monkey Knife Fight has partnered with 6 teams in the MLB: the Milwaukee Brewers, San Diego Padres, Miami Marlins, Minnesota Twins, San Francisco Giants and Texas Rangers. NFL partnerships include the Miami Dolphins, Tampa Bay Buccaneers, and Los Angeles Chargers. Through a deal with AEG, Monkey Knife Fight is also a partner with the NHL's Los Angeles Kings, MLS’ Los Angeles Galaxy, and AHL's Ontario Reign. They are also a sponsor of PGA golfer Charley Hoffman.

== Awards ==
Monkey Knife Fight has received a handful of recognitions for its position in the fantasy sports industry. SponsorUnited named MKF the sixth most-searched brand in sports and entertainment in 2020.

EGR named Monkey Knife Fight its Fantasy Sports Operator of the Year in 2020.

The company was also named as a finalist in the 2019 American Gambling Awards’ Fantasy Sports Operator of the Year category.

Monkey Knife Fight took home two awards from the FSGA 2019 awards—Rookie of the Year and Disruptor of the Year.
