= Bally's Corporation =

American gambling, betting and entertainment company

- Formerly: BLB Investors (2004–2011); Twin River Worldwide Holdings (2011–2020)
- Traded as: NYSE: BALY; Russell Microcap Index component
- Industry: Gambling, Entertainment
- Founded: 2004; 22 years ago
- Headquarters: Providence, Rhode Island, U.S.
- Key people: Soo Kim (Chairman); Robeson Reeves (CEO)
- Revenue: $2.4 billion (2023)
- Net income: $−187.5 million (2023)
- Total assets: $6.9 billion (2023)
- Total equity: $635 million (2023)
- Owner: Standard General (74%); Noel Hayden (10%)
- Number of employees: 10,500 (2023)
- Website: ballys.com

Bally's Corporation is an American gambling, betting, and interactive entertainment company headquartered in Providence, Rhode Island. In the US it operates 19 casinos across 11 states, a horse track in Colorado, a golf course in New York, and online sports betting operations in 14 states. In Australia, it operates two properties across two states through its Star Entertainment Group subsidiary.

The company was founded in 2004 as BLB Investors. It eventually changed its name to Twin River Worldwide Holdings. In 2020, the company acquired the rights to the Bally's brand from Caesars Entertainment and changed its own name to Bally's Corporation.

== History ==
Bally's originated as BLB Investors. BLB was formed in 2004, as a joint venture between Starwood Capital Group, Kerzner International, and the Waterford Group for the purpose of launching a bid to acquire Wembley plc. Wembley was a British operator of racetracks in the United Kingdom and the United States, whose primary asset was Lincoln Park, a greyhound track and slot machine parlor in Rhode Island. BLB reached a deal in February 2005, agreeing to pay $435 million for Lincoln Park, plus $20 million for Wembley's other U.S. properties, comprising a horse track (Arapahoe Park) and three greyhound tracks in Colorado. The purchase closed in July 2005.

BLB undertook a $220-million expansion of Lincoln Park and, in 2007, renamed it Twin River.

By 2008, as a result of the global economic recession, BLB was struggling financially and began defaulting on loans related to the purchase and renovation of Twin River. In June 2009, the company filed for Chapter 11 bankruptcy protection with a prepackaged plan to hand over ownership to its creditors. The company emerged from bankruptcy in 2010, now owned by a syndicate of lenders led by Bank of America, Wells Fargo, and Sankaty Advisors. In 2011, the company changed its name to Twin River Worldwide Holdings.

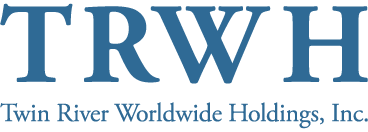
Logo of Twin River Worldwide Holdings (2011–2020)

In Colorado, the company's three dog racing tracks closed as interest in the sport declined, and all three had been sold off by 2011.

=== Land-based gambling expansion ===
In 2014, Twin River bought the Hard Rock Hotel & Casino Biloxi in Mississippi from Leucadia National for $250 million. The acquisition was made to diversify the company geographically, in preparation for expected competition from Massachusetts, which had legalized casinos in 2011.

In 2015, Twin River purchased Rhode Island's only other casino, the Newport Grand, for $22 million, and announced plans to relocate its operations to a new facility to be built in Tiverton, Rhode Island. The Newport Grand closed in 2018, and its replacement, the $140-million Tiverton Casino Hotel, opened days later.

In 2016, hedge fund Standard General took an ownership stake in Twin River, and its principal partner, Soo Kim, took a seat on the board. Kim went on to become Twin River's chairman in 2019, and began leading the company through a rapid expansion.

In March 2019, Twin River completed a reverse merger with Dover Downs Gaming & Entertainment, the parent company of Dover Downs Hotel & Casino. The transaction made Twin River a public company traded on the New York Stock Exchange and left Dover Downs shareholders with a 7 percent stake in the combined company.

Twin River acquired seven casinos in 2020. Three casinos in Black Hawk, Colorado (the Golden Gates, Golden Gulch, and Mardi Gras) were purchased from Affinity Gaming for $51 million. Isle of Capri Casino Kansas City in Missouri and Lady Luck Casino Vicksburg in Mississippi were bought from Eldorado Resorts for $230 million. The Eldorado Shreveport casino hotel in Louisiana was acquired from Eldorado for $140 million.

==== Name change to Bally's ====
In October 2020, Twin River acquired the rights to the Bally's brand from Caesars Entertainment for $20 million, in conjunction with the purchase of Bally's Atlantic City from Caesars Entertainment and Vici Properties for $25 million. At the time, Twin River said that it would rebrand "virtually all" of its properties under the Bally's name. In November 2020, the company changed its name to Bally's Corporation and its stock ticker symbol to BALY.

In 2021, Bally's separately acquired three casinos (MontBleu in Nevada, Jumer's Casino & Hotel in Illinois, and Tropicana Evansville in Indiana) for a total of $275 million. Meanwhile, the company reduced its real estate assets through sale-and-leaseback deals with Gaming and Leisure Properties, Inc. (GLPI) for the land and buildings of Dover Downs, Jumer's, and the three Black Hawk casinos, for a total sale of $294 million. Bally's also announced plans to co-develop a $120-million casino near State College, Pennsylvania and to build a $650-million casino development in Richmond, Virginia; these plans did not come to fruition, as the Richmond proposal was rejected by the city, and Bally's eventually withdrew from the State College project.

In January 2022, Standard General moved to take full ownership of Bally's, offering to buy all outstanding shares in a transaction valuing the company at $2.07 billion. The board of directors rejected the offer in May.

In May 2022, Bally's proposal for a $1.7-billion Bally's Chicago casino resort in the city's River West neighborhood was approved. It was projected to eventually account for one third of the company's gaming revenue. Bally's Chicago opened a temporary casino in September 2023 at the Medinah Temple. Phase 1 of the new, permanent facility is expected to open in 2026.

In September 2022, Bally's purchased the buildings and operating business of the Tropicana Las Vegas from GLPI and Penn Entertainment for $148 million. Bally's plans to replace the Tropicana with a 3,000 room integrated resort which will sit next to the New Las Vegas Stadium.

In 2024, Bally's agreed to a new buyout offer by Standard General and merger with The Queen Casino & Entertainment, a gaming company owned by Standard General. The buyout valued the combined company at $4.6 billion, and gave existing stockholders the option to retain their shares. The merger would add four casinos to Bally's portfolio, as well as an initial 33% stake in Intralot. In October 2025, following the sale of its International Interactive business to Intralot for €2.7 billion, Bally's increased its stake to 58% majority ownership in the combined entity. In December 2025, the company was renamed Bally's Intralot Α.Ε. The transaction was completed in February 2025, leaving Standard General as the owner of a 74% stake in the company.

==== New York ====
Bally's was among multiple bidders to apply for a casino license in New York, in February 2025, proposing to build an integrated resort at their Bally's Golf Links property at Ferry Point Park in the Bronx. After the New York City Council rejected related zoning changes, in July 2025, the vote was subsequently vetoed by Mayor Eric Adams and the city council opted not to override the veto.

In September 2025, Politico reported on connections that Bally's had with various lobbyists who were trying to influence the Trump administration to nominate Eric Adams to become ambassador to Saudi Arabia. The New York State Gaming Commission granted Bally's one of the first three New York City gaming licenses for a proposed $4 billion casino at its Ferry Point golf course, on December 15, 2025. When Bally's agreed to purchase the remainder of the Trump Organization's lease for Ferry Point, it agreed that if Bally’s converts the site into a casino, it must pay the Trump Organization $115 million.

==== Australia ====
In April 2025, Bally's agreed to an investment in Star Entertainment Group, a struggling Australian casino company. Bally's would lend $180 million to Star with an option to convert the debt into up to a 57% interest in the company. Star's two properties (The Star, Sydney and The Star Gold Coast) would represent Bally's first land-based casinos outside the United States. On June 25, 2025, Star Entertainment shareholders approved the Bally's takeover. Months after the deal was approved, Star sold its stake in The Star Brisbane.

=== Interactive gambling expansion ===
In November 2020, Bally's entered into a long-term media partnership with Sinclair Broadcast Group, which would include the rebranding of its Fox Sports Networks regional sports networks under the Bally brand in a 10-year deal, and integration of Bally's content into its sports properties. The agreement included warrants that would allow Sinclair to acquire up to a 14.9% stake in Bally's, and increase its stake to up to 24.9% if performance criteria are met. The nineteen regional sports networks were rebranded as Bally Sports in March 2021.

In 2021, Bally's made several acquisitions to expand its online gaming and sports betting business. In February, it acquired SportCaller, a provider of free-to-play online games. The next month, the company acquired Monkey Knife Fight, the third-largest daily fantasy sports operator in the U.S., for up to $90 million in stock. In June, Bally's acquired the sports betting platform Bet.Works for $125 million. In July, it acquired the Association of Volleyball Professionals. In October, it acquired Gamesys Group, a British online gambling company, for $2.7 billion.

By acquiring Gamesys, Bally's became the online casino and bingo operator for six UK-based platforms. These are Virgin Games, Jackpotjoy, Monopoly Casino, Rainbow Riches Casino, Double Bubble Bingo, and Bally Casino.

In 2023, Bally's launched Bally Live, a streaming sports video service. The service was rebranded to Bally Sports Live in March 2025. The app features live streaming from Stadium, Minor League Baseball, Bare Knuckle Fighting Championship, Glory Kickboxing, the Association of Volleyball Professionals, and the Pro Fighters League. The service previously aired Major League Table Tennis, and the Pro Volleyball Federation. On 5 August 2025, Bally's became the new shirt sponsor for English Premier League club Nottingham Forest.

== Properties ==
The company operates twenty casino properties, a standalone horse track, and a golf course:

=== United States ===
- Bally's Arapahoe Park — Aurora, Colorado
- Bally's Atlantic City — Atlantic City, New Jersey
- Bally's Baton Rouge — Baton Rouge, Louisiana
- Bally's Black Hawk — Black Hawk, Colorado
- Bally's Chicago — Chicago, Illinois (temporary casino; permanent facility planned to open in 2026)
- Bally's Dover — Dover, Delaware
- Bally's Evansville — Evansville, Indiana
- Bally's Golf Links at Ferry Point — The Bronx, New York
- Bally's Kansas City — Kansas City, Missouri
- Bally's Lake Tahoe — Stateline, Nevada
- Bally's Quad Cities — Rock Island, Illinois
- Bally's Shreveport — Shreveport, Louisiana
- Bally's Tiverton — Tiverton, Rhode Island
- Bally's Twin River Lincoln — Lincoln, Rhode Island
- Bally's Vicksburg — Vicksburg, Mississippi
- Casino Queen Marquette — Marquette, Iowa
- DraftKings at Casino Queen — East St. Louis, Illinois
- Hard Rock Hotel & Casino Biloxi — Biloxi, Mississippi
- The Queen Baton Rouge — Baton Rouge, Louisiana

=== United Kingdom ===
- Bally's Newcastle – Newcastle upon Tyne, England

=== Australia ===
Bally's has two properties in Australia through their subsidiary, Star Entertainment Group;

- The Star, Sydney
- The Star Gold Coast

=== Former properties ===
- Tropicana Las Vegas — Paradise, Nevada (closed and demolished in 2024)
- The Star Brisbane - Brisbane, Queensland (Star sold its stake in 2025)

=== Proposed properties ===
- Bally's Las Vegas — Paradise, Nevada
- Bally's New York — The Bronx, New York

== See also ==
- List of integrated resorts
- List of casino hotels
