= The 78 =

Chicago neighborhood under development

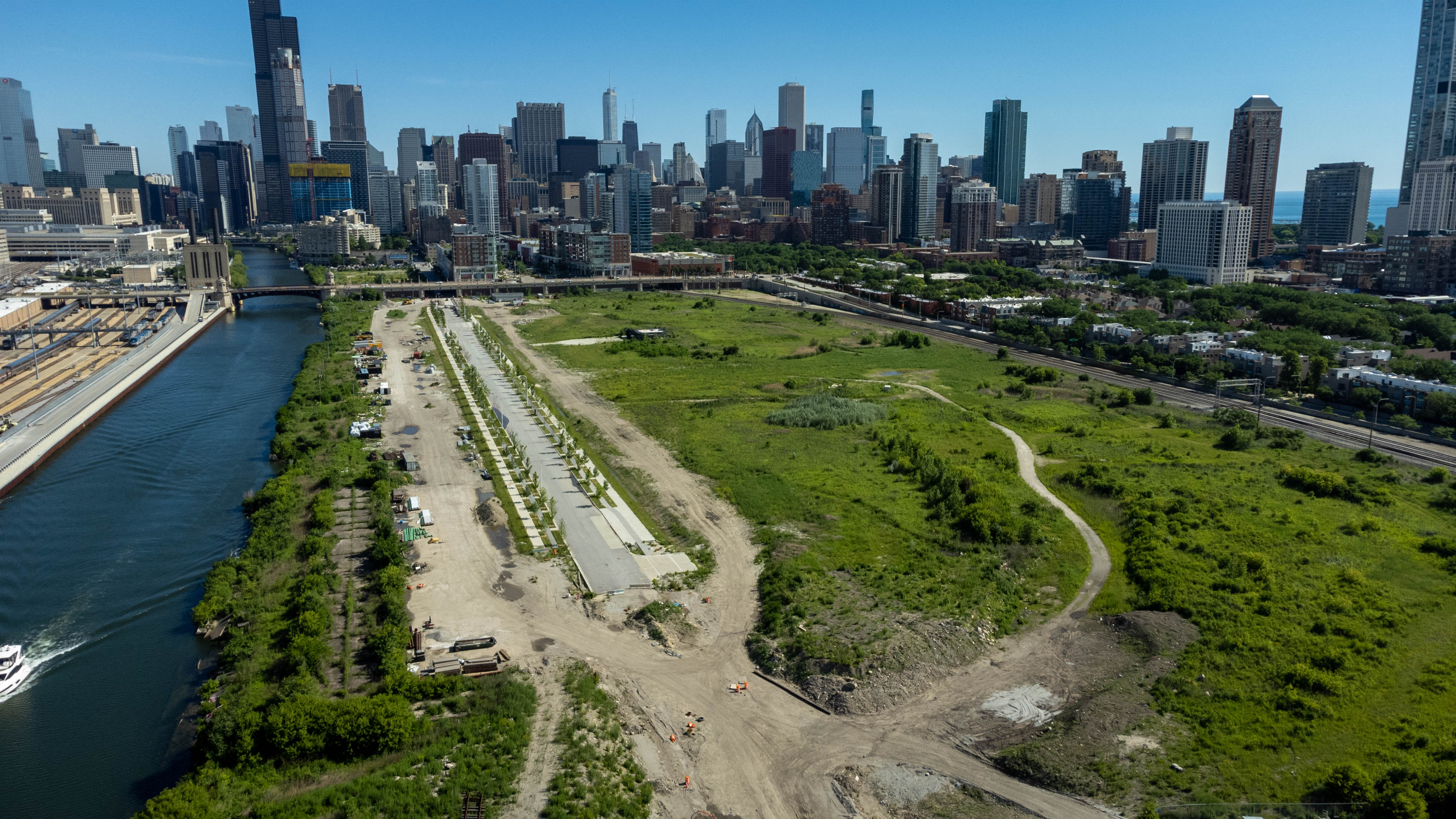
- The 78 in 2022
- Interactive map of The 78
- Location: Chicago, Illinois
- Coordinates: 41°51′53″N 87°37′56″W
- Use: Mixed-use
- Website: 78chicago.com

Companies
- Architect: Skidmore, Owings & Merrill
- Developer: Related Midwest

Technical details
- Cost: $7 billion
- Size: 62 acres (25 ha)

The 78 is a plot of land undergoing urban renewal infill in South Loop, Chicago. Its name refers to the existing 77 community areas in Chicago. The 78 stretches from Roosevelt Road south to 16th Street, and Clark Street west to the Chicago River. Ping Tom Memorial Park is adjacent to its south, and St. Charles Air Line Bridge is on the opposing river bank.

In June 2025, the owner of the Chicago Fire soccer team proposed to build a soccer stadium on the site, and the Chicago Fire held a groundbreaking ceremony on March 3, 2026 for McDonald's Park, expected to be completed in time for the 2028 soccer season.

== History ==
The planned mixed use development is located on a 62-acre parcel of land just south of Downtown Chicago and north of Chinatown. The area is bordered by Roosevelt Road to the north, Clark Street to the east, 16th Street to the south, and the South Branch of the Chicago River to the west. Much of the land was created through landfills in the 1920s as part of a $9 million realignment of the River. The area then became a railyard for trains traveling to or from Grand Central station and LaSalle Street station.

The railyard was eventually demolished in the 1970s, forming a 62-acre vacant lot. The former railyard remained in limbo for decades. In 2001, Tony Rezko bought the entire land for mixed-use development. His plan did not come to fruition and he eventually sold the land in 2005.

Many plans have been proposed or discussed for the site. Related Midwest acquired the land in 2016. The 78 was the site of an unrealized 2018 megadevelopment proposal for several office and residential towers, high-rises, and a riverwalk. Since 2016 Related Midwest is the owner of the site. Although the Chicago City Council approved the megadevelopment in April 2019 (including a tax increment financing agreement), it was not built. The megadevelopment was to include a $1.2 billion research center called the Discovery Partners Institute, which would have been operated by the University of Illinois.

In 2021, it was proposed to put a Rivers Casino in The 78 as part of the Chicago casino proposals, but the city selected a site in the River West district near the intersection of Chicago Avenue and Halsted Street. Community groups opposed the 2022 plan to build a Rivers 78 casino at The 78 location.

Aerial video of The 78, an Amtrak train, Ping Tom Park, and distant view of the Chicago Loop

In 2024, it was reported that the Chicago White Sox and its owner Jerry Reinsdorf were in discussions with Related Midwest to potentially build a new stadium on the site to replace Rate Field following the end of the team's lease in 2029. In addition to the stadium, the plan calls for retail, offices, and housing.

Between August and September 2024, the White Sox and developer Related Midwest built a temporary field on the site.

The owner of the Chicago Fire FC soccer team Joe Mansueto proposed to build a soccer-specific stadium on a 9-acre site in The 78. Mansueto planned to use private funds, while City of Chicago would be responsible for site preparation, as the area was lacking in basic utilities (water, sewer, electric) at present. Some unused railroad tracks had to be removed. The Fire's aim is to open the team’s 2028 season in its own stadium.

Earlier, the owner and developer presented the idea of a joint stadium. Chicago Fire FC, which currently plays at Soldier Field, would construct a new stadium there along with the White Sox. Mansueto's plans to privately finance a new stadium makes their path much clearer than that of the Bears and White Sox if they choose to develop in this area just south of the Loop, given the aforementioned two teams are seeking public funding. Ultimately, a soccer-specific plan went ahead.

Chicago Fire FC owner Joe Mansueto, Mayor Brandon Johnson, Major League Soccer Commissioner Don Garber, Chicago Fire President of Business Operations Dave Baldwin, and Related Midwest President Curt Bailey joined the groundbreaking ceremony for McDonald's Park on March 3, 2026. The soccer stadium will be officially named McDonald's Park under a long-term naming rights partnership with Chicago-based fast-food brand McDonald's. The deal runs through at least 2040 and is the first time McDonald's has purchased naming rights for a major professional sports stadium in the United States.

== See also ==
- Hudson Yards
- Odaiba
- Dearborn Park
- Riverside South, Manhattan
