= Medinah Temple =

Moorish Revival building in Chicago

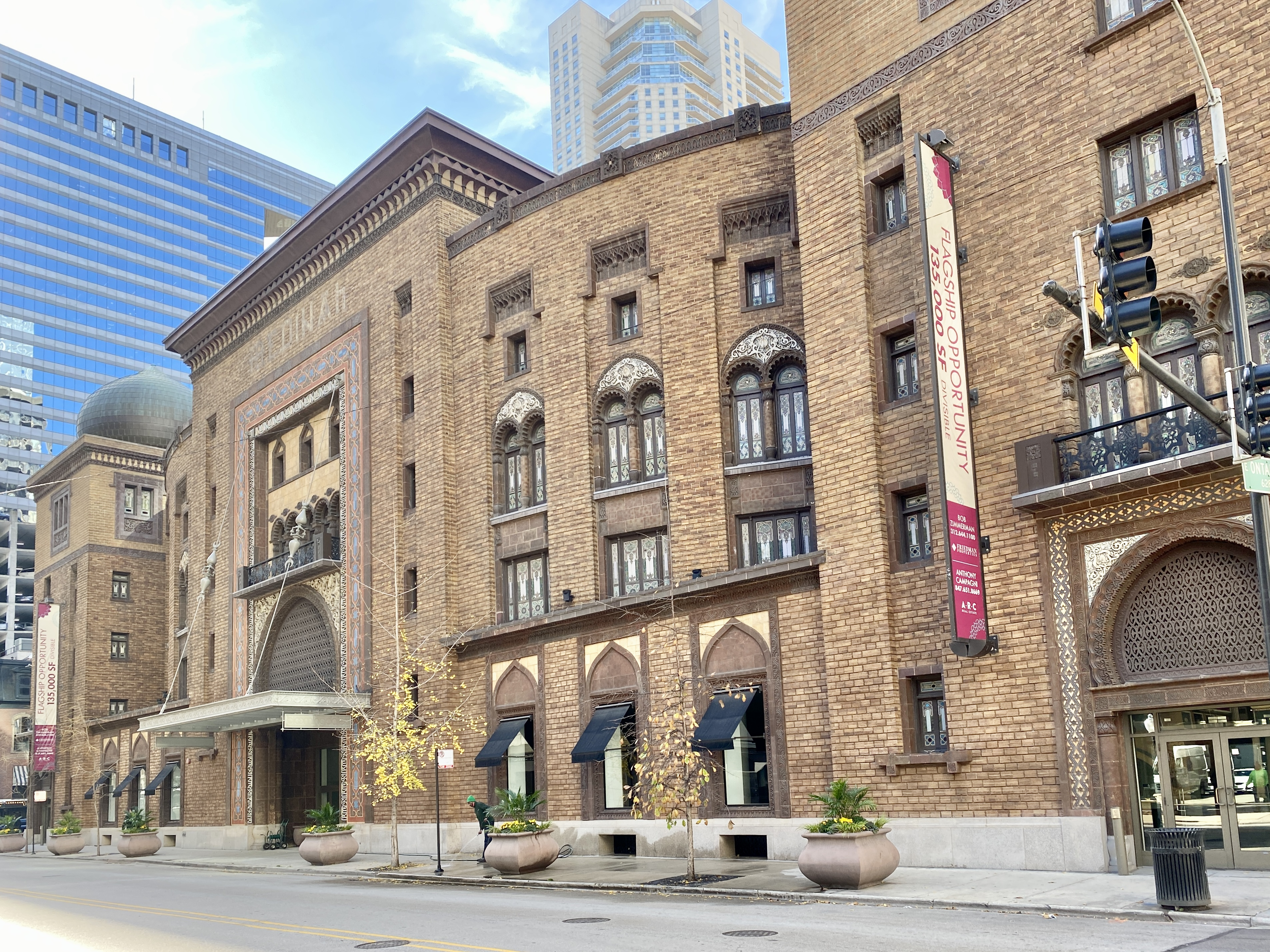
- Medinah Temple Facade
- Interactive map of the Medinah Temple area

General information
- Type: Auditorium, rebuilt as a department store in 2000, rebuilt as a casino in 2023
- Location: 600 N. Wabash Ave. Chicago, Illinois; United States
- Coordinates: 41°53′34″N 87°37′38″W
- Completed: 1912

Design and construction
- Architect: Huehl & Schmid

The Medinah Temple is a Moorish Revival building in Chicago, Illinois, United States. It is located on the Near North Side at 600 N. Wabash Avenue, extending from Ohio Street to Ontario Street. It was designated a Chicago Landmark in 2000.

The Medinah Temple was built by the Shriners architects Huehl & Schmid in 1912 as a home for the Medinah Shriners with a large auditorium and meeting spaces. As of January 2025 it is the temporary home of Bally's Chicago casino, while the $1.7B permanent location is being constructed nearby.

== History ==
=== Auditorium ===
The building originally housed an ornate auditorium, seating approximately 4,200 people, on three levels. The stage floor extended a considerable distance into the auditorium, and the seating was arranged in a U-shape around it. The auditorium contained an Austin Organ Company pipe organ (opus no. 558), installed in 1915, with 92 ranks, a 5-manual fixed console and a 4-manual movable console (added in 1931). Among the many events that took place in this venue was the annual Shrine Circus. Additionally, WGN-TV used the Medinah Temple for "The Bozo 25th Anniversary Special" (telecast live September 7, 1986).

The fine acoustics of the Medinah Temple's auditorium made it a favorite site for recording. Many of the Chicago Symphony Orchestra's most famous recordings from the late 1960s (for RCA with then-music director Jean Martinon) through the 1980s (for Decca with then-music director Sir Georg Solti) were recorded there. The music to Fantasia 2000 was recorded at the Medinah Temple auditorium from 1994 to 1996.

The auditorium also contained a five-manual, 92 rank pipe organ, Austin Organs Opus 558, installed in 1915. The instrument was the first five-manual instrument built by the firm and one of the largest in the city. It was controlled by a five-manual gallery console and a movable four-manual console. In March 2001 the City Council approved funding to remove the organ for eventual donation to a non-profit organization. It was donated to a church in Old Mill Creek, Illinois, but was never installed due to the prohibitively high cost of re-assembly. According to the Organ Historical Society database the instrument is no longer extant.

=== Retail store ===
In late 2000, the Medinah Shriners left the building. The exterior was restored, while the interior was gutted and rebuilt as Bloomingdale's Home and Furniture Store, which opened in 2003. In June 2019, Bloomingdale's parent company, Macy's, sold the building to Chicago developer Al Friedman. The store closed in September 2020 for redevelopment.

The building was designated a Chicago Landmark on June 27, 2001.

=== Casino ===
On May 5, 2022, it was reported that the Medinah Temple would be renovated as a temporary home for Bally's Chicago casino, which had been approved by Chicago Mayor Lori Lightfoot. The proposal was approved by the Chicago City Council in December 2022 and the Illinois Gaming Board in September 2023. The temporary casino opened on September 9, 2023. It is expected to remain at Medinah Temple until the casino's permanent location in the River West neighborhood is completed in 2026. In its first two years of operation, the casino's revenue was far below expectations, with 2023 bringing 25% of the expected revenue and 2024 bringing in 47% of expected revenue. 2025 saw revenue again come in under half the expectation.
