= Bally's Chicago =

Proposed casino in Chicago

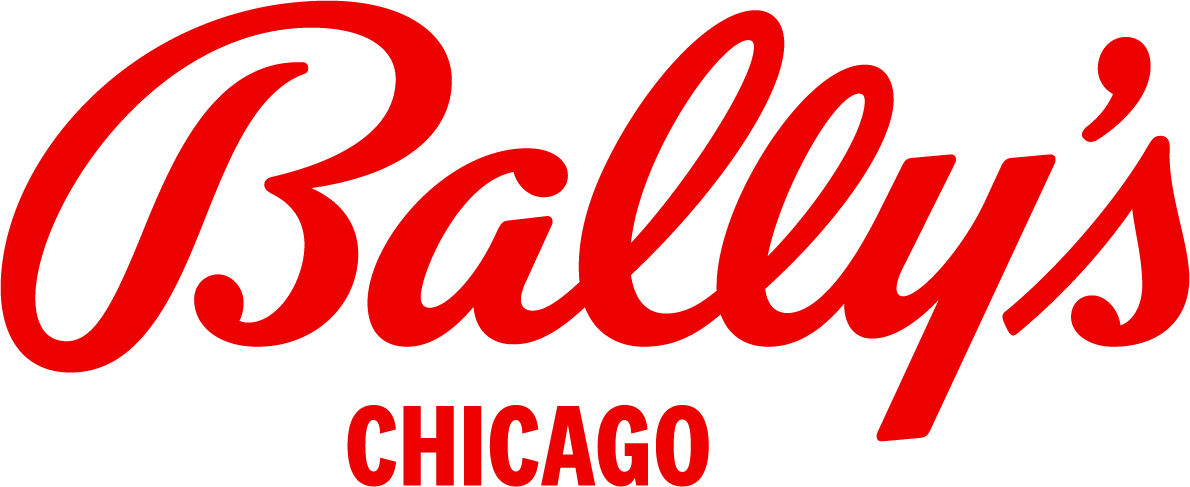

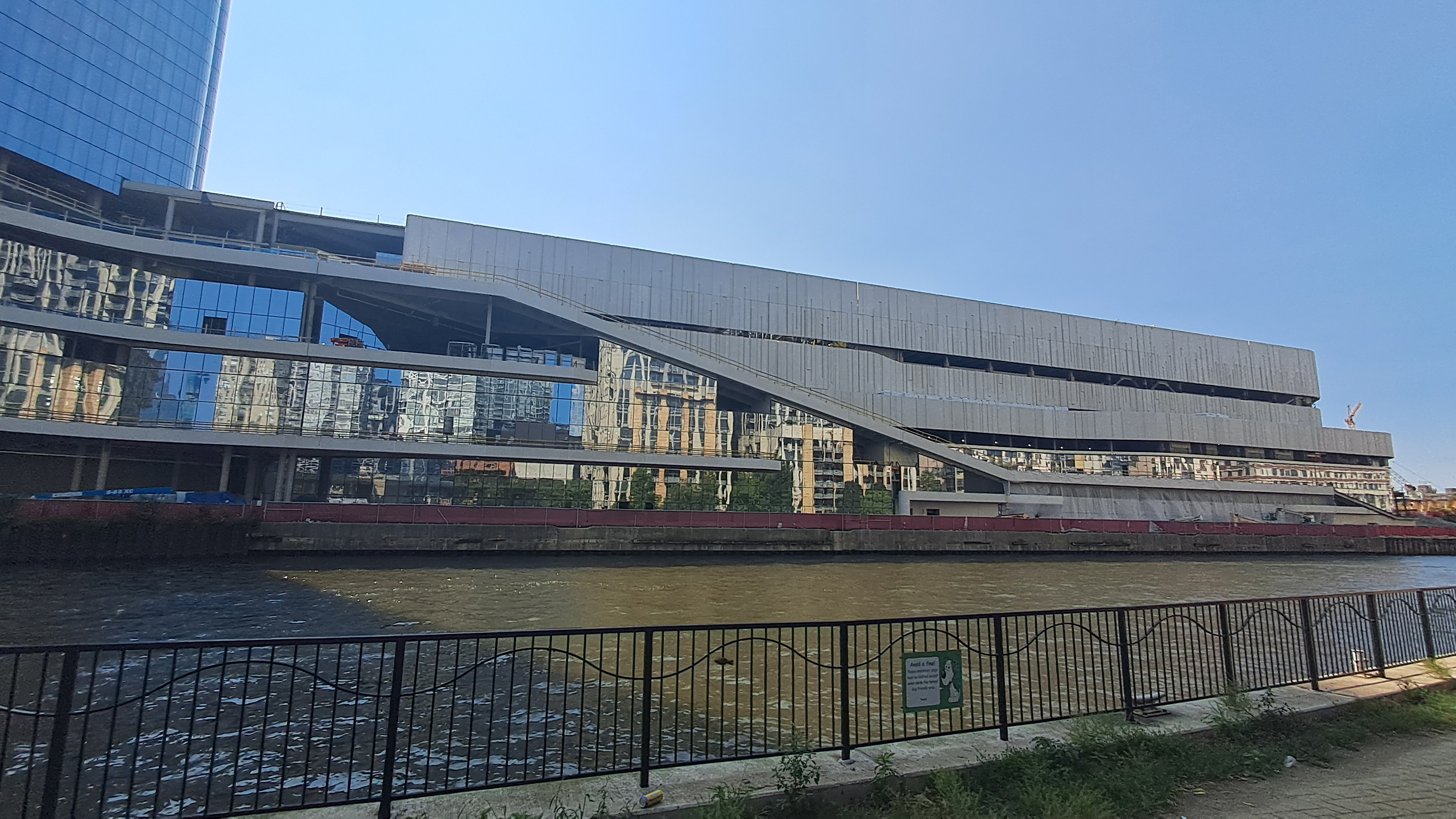
- Construction on Bally's Chicago, August 2026
- Interactive map of Bally's Chicago
- Location: Chicago, Illinois, U.S.; 777 W. Chicago Ave; 41°53′43″N 87°38′45″W
- Opened: c. 2027
- Theme: Modernism
- No. of rooms: Estimated 500
- Signature attractions: Chicago River
- Casino type: Land-based
- Owner: Bally's Corporation; Community Investment Programs
- Website: casinos.ballys.com/chicago/

Bally's Chicago is a casino and entertainment venue temporarily located in the Medinah Temple Building, and a planned integrated resort that will be built on the North Branch of the Chicago River in Chicago. In May 2022, then Mayor Lori Lightfoot approved Bally's Corporation's bid to construct a casino complex in the city. The complex will be in the city's River West neighborhood, near Grand Avenue, Chicago Avenue and Halsted Street. The plan was approved by the Chicago City Council in May 2022, and a State of Illinois gambling license was issued in 2023. The integrated resort began construction in 2025, and is expected to open in 2027. Demolition of the old structures on site began in August 2024.

== Background ==
In the 2019 mayoral election, then-mayoral candidates Lori Lightfoot and Toni Preckwinkle both indicated approval for a casino in Chicago.

Legislation expanding gambling in Illinois was passed by the state legislature at the start of June 2019 and signed by Governor J. B. Pritzker. However this bill did not approve the construction of a casino. Shortly afterwards, Lightfoot announced that the city would commence the study of where a Chicago casino would be located. Lightfoot's predecessors had long sought to obtain a casino for the city.

In November 2019 a gaming bill proposed by Pritzker failed to be passed in the Illinois Legislature due to a veto session. An official statement by Lightfoot stated that the failed bill proposal would not impact the construction plans. She continued to push for a lower effective tax rate for a casino and for authorization of a jointly owned casino by the state and Chicago. The city wanted to generate $200 million in annual tax revenue to fund police and firefighter pension funds with the casino.

=== IPO controversy & litigation ===
In 2025, Bally's, along with the city of Chicago and state gambling regulators, were sued for discrimination by two Texans, Richard Fisher and Phillip Aronoff, alongside the American Alliance for Equal Rights. As part of the casino's agreement with the city, Bally's launched an IPO exclusively for women and minorities to own 25% of the casino, which the plaintiffs argued was discrimination. Bally's warned ahead of the offering that this requirement may result in a lawsuit. The lawsuit was settled in June 2025. Another lawsuit was filed by Liberty Justice Center on behalf of Mark Glennon, which was later dismissed following Bally's announcement of a revised IPO with the previous restrictions removed. Following a lack of SEC approval for the IPO, Bally's refunded prospective investors. Bally's later completed a revised IPO in August 2025 that was open to all with a preference for Chicago and Illinois-based investors.

== Impact of 2026 video gaming expansion ==
In late 2025, the Chicago City Council included the legalization of video gaming terminals (VGTs) in the city's $16.6 billion 2026 municipal budget to address a $1.15 billion deficit. The plan, which took effect on January 1, 2026, allows bars and restaurants with liquor licenses to host gaming machines, ending a decades-long ban in the city.

Bally's Corporation opposed the measure, arguing that widespread VGT competition would cannibalize revenue from its flagship project. In testimony before the City Council, Bally's Vice President of Government Relations estimated that the expansion could result in a $70 million annual loss in tax revenue for the city and potentially lead to the reduction of 750 to 1,050 projected jobs at the casino resort. Legal experts have noted that authorizing VGTs may constitute a breach of the "Host Community Agreement" signed in 2022, which grants Bally's exclusivity over most forms of "lawful gaming" within city limits. As of January 2026, the implementation of the VGT rollout remains the subject of ongoing negotiations between the Mayor's office and the City Council.

In August 2026, it was reported that Bally's paused all non-gambling construction, blaming VGT legalization. However, Bally's disputed this report and confirmed that construction was continuing under revised plans and only 12% of the planned amenities were under review.

== Bidding process ==
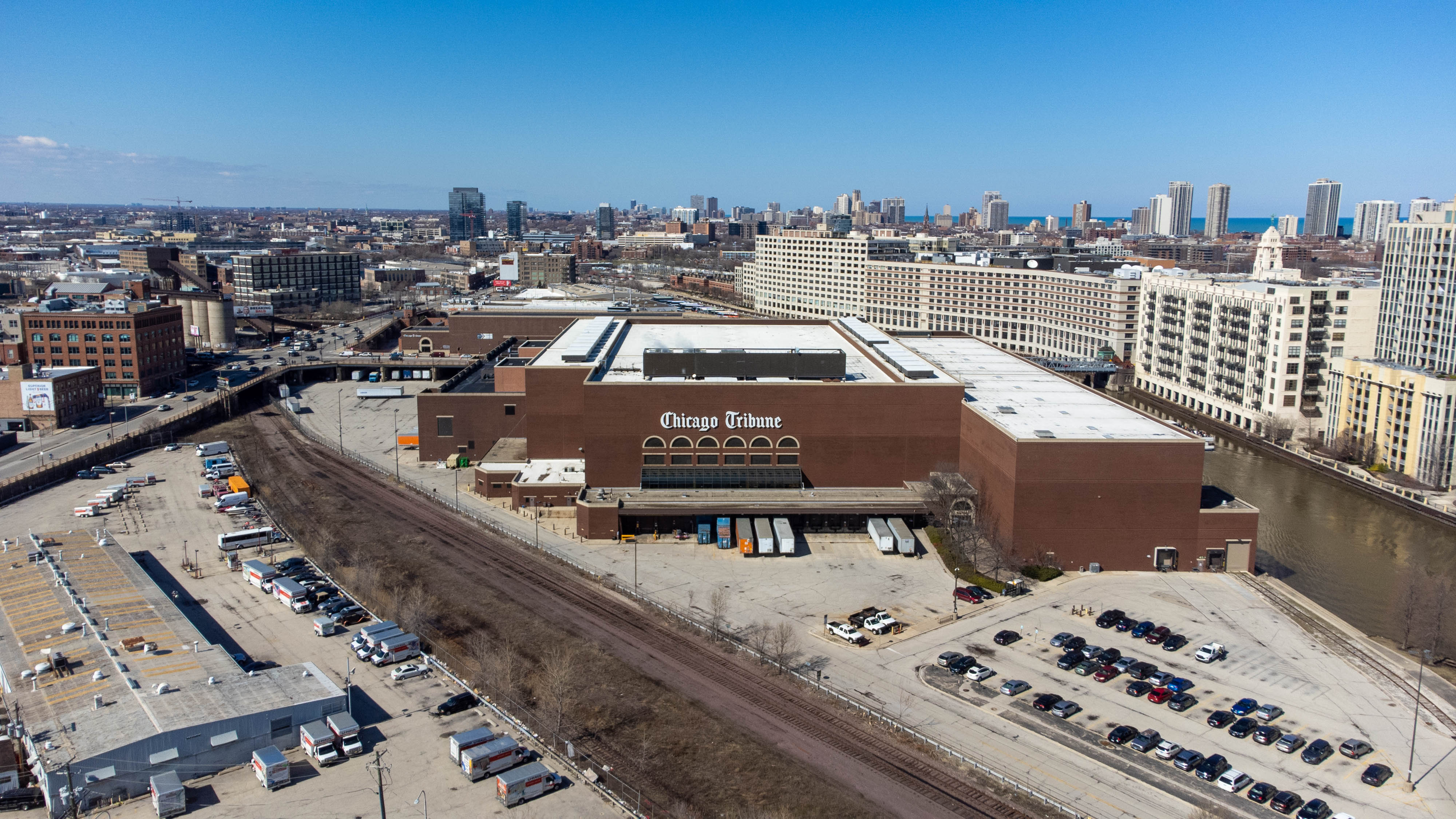
The casino complex will be constructed on the site of the Freedom Center, which is adjacent to the Chicago River.

In April 2021, Lightfoot announced the beginning of the bidding process for the city's "casino-resort". She stated that proposals must include plans for a 500-room hotel, meeting space, restaurants, bars and entertainment venues.

In November 2021, Lightfoot announced the city's top five bids for a Chicago casino. She set a public meeting for the proposals for December 16, 2021.

In March 2022, the three final bidding proposals were announced. The first was from Rush Street Gaming, which would cost US$1.62 billion and would be built between the South Loop and Chinatown along the Chicago River. The second was a US$1.74 billion proposal from the eventual chosen Bally's Corporation to build the casino and resort on the Chicago Tribune printing plant in the River West neighborhood. The final proposal was a $1.74 billion proposal from Hard Rock to build the casino and resort, across from Soldier Field.

On May 5, 2022, Lightfoot announced that she had selected the bid from the Bally's Corporation. The proposal needed city council approval and Illinois Gaming Board approval. Reaction to the casino selection was controversial with many residents living near the proposed site.

== Casino details ==
=== Permanent casino ===
A rendering of the casino resort

When the Bally's Corporation sought their bid, they proposed a $1.6 billion casino and resort, where the Chicago Tribune Freedom Center was located. Bally's had the option to buy the 30-acre site. Bally Corporation and Community Investment Programs are record owners of the resort, and architects, Solomon Cordwell Buenz, oversee the construction with several additional firms. Gensler architects will design the casino resort facilities and Solomon Cordwell will design the hotel.

The first phase was estimated to cost $1 billion and included 2,700 slot machines, 95 table games, and a hotel with 100 suites. If Bally's received a 20% return on investment, the casino would be expanded for $600 million. 4,000 gaming seats, a new 400 room hotel, a 3000-seat indoor venue, and a 20,000 sq ft exhibition space would be added.

==== Location ====
A casino location was proposed on the south street of McCormick Place near Lake Shore Drive. This proposal was rejected by the Chicago City Council in March 2022. The James R. Thompson Center was also discussed as a possible casino venue.

In May 2022, the location of the casino and resort was announced and would be located in the River West neighborhood. The temporary location opened on September 9, 2023, with the permanent location opening in 2027.

=== Temporary casino ===
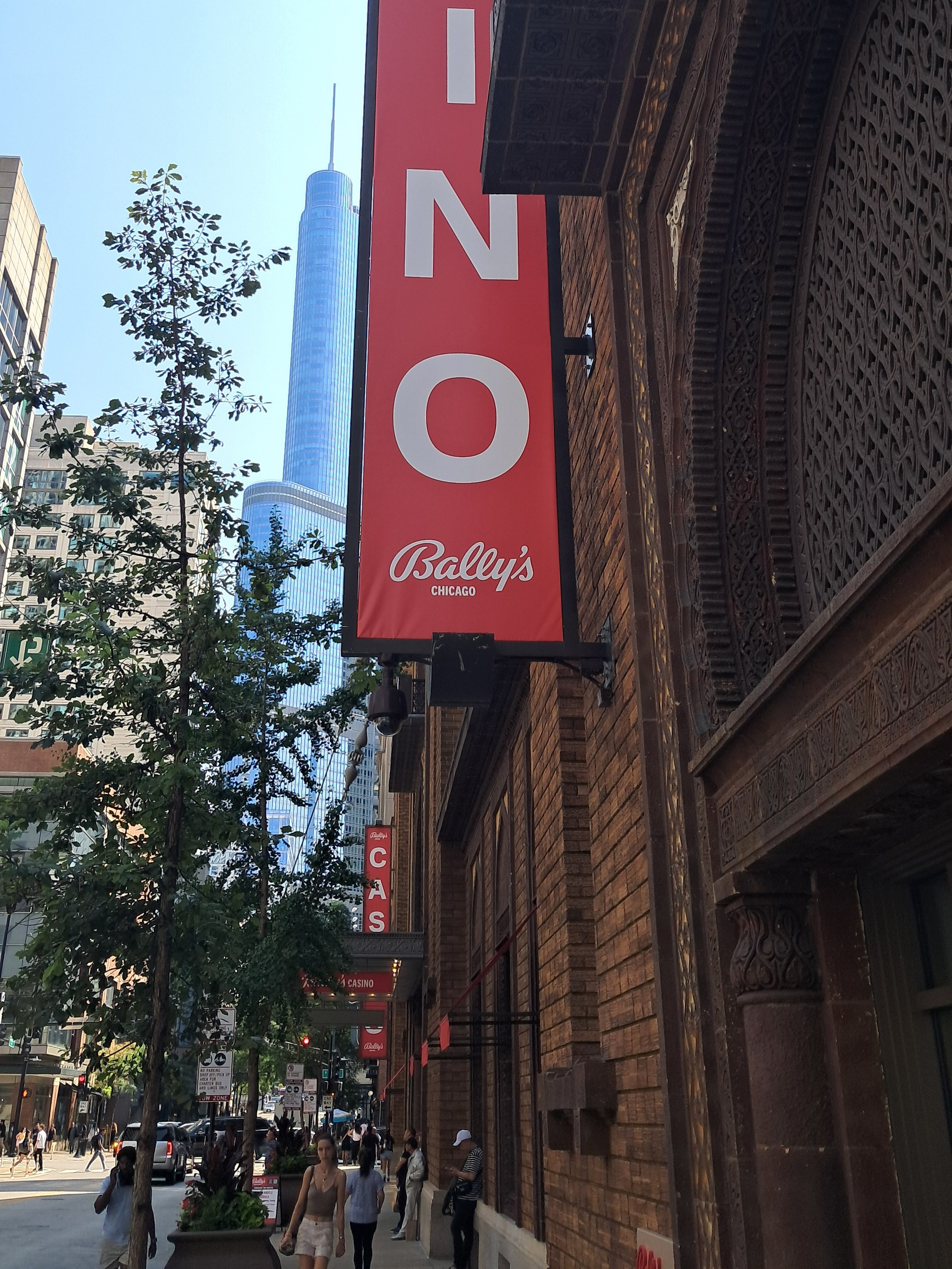
Bally's Chicago at Medinah Temple

On May 5, 2022, it was reported that the Medinah Temple would be renovated as the casino's temporary home, which had been approved by Chicago Mayor Lori Lightfoot. The proposal was approved by the Chicago City Council in December 2022 and the Illinois Gaming Board in September 2023. The temporary casino opened on September 9, 2023. It is expected to remain at Medinah Temple until the casino's permanent location in the River West neighborhood is completed in 2027. In its first two years of operation, the casino's revenue was far below expectations, with 2023 bringing 25% of the expected revenue and 2024 bringing in 47% of expected revenue. 2025 saw revenue again come in under half the expectation.

In January 2026, Rep. Kam Buckner introduced a bill to extend the temporary casino's license for another year, due to delays in the construction of the permanent casino. While this bill ultimately didn't pass, an extension of the casino's license was included in the state's omnibus revenue law, extending the license to September 9, 2027.

== See also ==
- List of integrated resorts
