= Hard Rock Live (disambiguation) =

Hard Rock Live is a chain of live entertainment venues operated by the Hard Rock International brand.

Hard Rock Live may also refer to:

== Locations ==
- Hard Rock Live (in Seminole Hard Rock Hollywood) – 7,000-seat arena
  - Hard Rock Live (2005–2018) – the original, now-rebuilt 5,500-seat Hollywood location
- Hard Rock Live (Atlantic City, New Jersey) – also known as Mark G. Etess Arena, at the Hard Rock Hotel & Casino Atlantic City
- Hard Rock Live Tulsa, a licensed arena at Hard Rock Hotel & Casino Tulsa formerly known as The Joint
- Hard Rock Live Rockford at Hard Rock Casino Rockford
- Hard Rock Live Biloxi, a licensed arena at Hard Rock Hotel & Casino Biloxi
- Hard Rock Live Bristol, 2,000+-seat arena at Hard Rock Hotel & Casino Bristol
- Hard Rock Live Sacramento, a 2,500-seat theater at Hard Rock Hotel & Casino Sacramento at Fire Mountain
- Hard Rock Live Northern Indiana, a 1,950-seat concert hall at Hard Rock Casino Northern Indiana
- Hard Rock Live Las Vegas, proposed 5,000-seat arena at the upcoming Hard Rock Las Vegas
- Hard Rock Live Orlando at Universal CityWalk
- Showcase Mall, which has a flagship Hard Rock Cafe that features Hard Rock Live

== Unaffiliated amenities ==
- Hard Rock Live (album) – the 2010 Bad Company album
- Channel V at the Hard Rock Live

== See also ==
- Hard Rock (disambiguation)
- Hard Rock Hotel and Casino (disambiguation)
- Hard Rock Cafe (disambiguation)
