= Hard Rock Hotel and Casino (disambiguation) =

Hard Rock Hotel and Casino is a hotel and/or casino franchise.

Hard Rock Hotel or Hard Rock Casino may also refer to:

== Locations ==
=== United States ===
- Hard Rock Hotel at Universal Orlando, Florida
- Hard Rock Hotel and Casino (Biloxi), Mississippi
- Hard Rock Hotel and Casino (Tulsa), Oklahoma
- Hard Rock Hotel and Casino (Las Vegas), Nevada (1995–2020)
  - Also the name of a new location utilizing the Mirage Hotel and Casino under construction
- Hard Rock Hotel & Casino Lake Tahoe, Nevada
- Hard Rock Hotel & Casino Atlantic City, New Jersey
  - Also the name of a once-planned but since-canceled casino
- Hard Rock Hotel & Casino Sioux City, Iowa
- Hard Rock Hotel New Orleans, Louisiana, which was never built
- Hard Rock Hotel New York
- Hard Rock Rocksino Northfield Park, now MGM Northfield Park, Ohio
- Hard Rock Casino Cincinnati, Ohio
- Hard Rock Hotel & Casino Bristol, Virginia
- Hard Rock Casino Northern Indiana
- Hard Rock Casino Rockford, Illinois
- Seminole Hard Rock Hotel & Casino Hollywood, Florida
- Seminole Hard Rock Hotel and Casino Tampa, Florida

=== Elsewhere ===
- Hard Rock Casino Vancouver, British Columbia, Canada
- Hard Rock Hotel, at the City of Dreams, Macau, China
- Hard Rock Hotel, on the beach of George Town, Penang, Malaysia
- Hard Rock Hotel, at Resorts World Sentosa, Singapore
- Hard Rock Hotel, in Davos, Switzerland
- Hard Rock Hotel Ibiza, Spain
- Hard Rock Hotel & Casino All Inclusive, Punta Cana
- Hard Rock Hotel & Casino Athens, in Athens, Greece

== Other ==
- Hard Rock Casino (video game)

== See also ==
- Hard Rock (disambiguation)
