= Hard Rock Hotel & Casino Punta Cana =

All-inclusive resort on the Macao Beach in the Dominican Republic

- Exterior view (November 2010)
- Interactive map of Hard Rock Hotel & Casino Punta Cana
- Location: Punta Cana, Dominican Republic; Km 28, #74, Blvd. Turístico del Este; 18°44′0.398″N 68°28′57.478″W
- Opened: As Moon Palace Resort: January 2009; 17 years ago (soft opening); December 2009; 16 years ago (grand opening); As Hard Rock: November 1, 2010; 16 years ago (soft opening); January 29, 2011; 15 years ago (grand opening)
- Theme: Rock and roll; Tropical Caribbean style
- No. of rooms: 1,775–1,800
- Signature attractions: Rockaway Bay Water Park; Hard Rock Roxity Kids Club; Oro Nightclub
- Notable restaurants: Ciao Trattoria; Ipanema Brazilian House; The Market Food Hall; Montserrat Manor; Toro Steakhouse; YouYu Noodle Bar; Zen
- Owner: RCD Hotels
- Operating license holder: Hard Rock International; Inversiones Zahena, S.A.
- Architect: 555 International (exterior); The Gettys Group; Jeffrey Beers International (interior)
- Previous names: Moon Palace Casino, Golf & Spa Resort (2009–2010)
- Website: hotel.hardrock.com/punta-cana/

Hard Rock Hotel & Casino Punta Cana is an all-inclusive resort on the Macao Beach in the Dominican Republic. The property was formerly and briefly known as the Moon Palace Casino, Golf & Spa Resort before it was rebranded via a joint venture between Palace Resorts and the Seminole Tribe of Florida-owned Hard Rock International.

Due to a corporate split between the Chapur brothers, the property is owned by RCD Hotels rather than the Palace Company. As the first all-inclusive Hard Rock Hotel and Casino, its expansions have included the introduction of family-friendly amenities, such as the Hard Rock Roxity Kids Club, and the Rockaway Bay Water Park. The property is more commonly branded by management as the Hard Rock Hotel Punta Cana. The AIC Hotel Group helps with marketing the resort.

== History ==
=== 2009–2011: Development and opening ===
Oro Nightclub (August 2013)

In January 2009, the Moon Palace Casino, Golf & Spa Resort had a soft opening over a 121-acre (49 ha) site on the Macao Beach in La Altagracia, Dominican Republic. Its grand opening followed in December of that year with 1,790 rooms, which is when Hard Rock International of Orlando, Florida formed a joint venture with Palace Resorts LLC (later spun off into RCD Resorts after Roberto Chapur split with founder José Chapur), allowing them to license the "Hard Rock" name from Hard Rock Hotel Licensing, Inc. They announced that the Moon Palace Resort would be rebranded as the Hard Rock Hotel & Casino Punta Cana, which would become Hard Rock's first Caribbean resort. The proposal for the $25 million Hard Rock renovation included a casino with a VIP lounge, a 457 slot machines, 40 table games, and a poker room, while the hotel would have 620 rooms for guests, and it would become Hard Rock Hotel and Casino's first all-inclusive resort.

The architect for the overhaul would be 555 International for the exterior, and the Chicago, Illinois-based Gettys Group. Jeffrey Beers International designed the interior. The 1,800-room Hard Rock Hotel & Casino Punta Cana would have its soft opening to guests on November 1, 2010, followed by a grand opening celebration on the week of January 26 to 30, 2011 as Hard Rock Cafe celebrated its 40th anniversary, with the Lucky 21 Guitar Smash, the donation of brand new guitars to children to support music education, and concerts by Blue Öyster Cult, The Wailers, Gipsy Kings and More Than Me. The property featured music memorabilia, a 48,000-square-foot (4,500 m^{2}) Vegas-style casino, while also having 65,000 square feet (6,000 m^{2}) of gaming space. It also had three distinct nightclubs, one of which, being the 14,000 sq ft (1,300 m^{2}), two-story Oro Nightclub, being designed to rival similar nightclubs in Miami and Las Vegas.

=== 2013–present: Family expansions ===
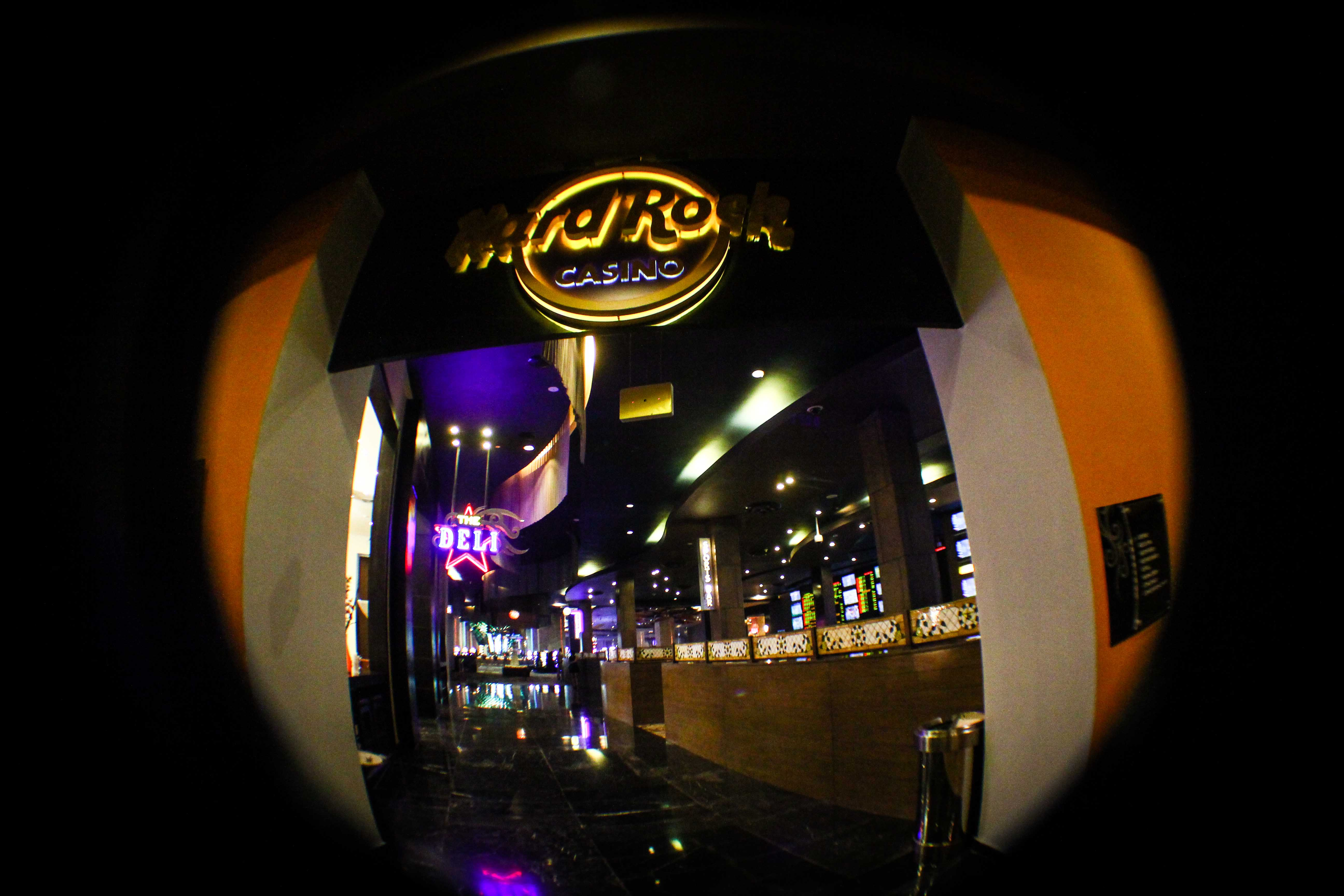
Casino entrance (August 2013)

On March 12, 2013, Kerry Simon, known as the "Rock n' Roll Chef" by Rolling Stone, partnered with RCD Hotels to open Simon Mansion and Supper Club at the Hard Rock in May of that year. Due to the COVID-19 pandemic, the property had to undergo Hard Rock's "Safe + Sound" social distancing guidelines.

In June 2022, a grand reopening was held; a multi-year temporary closure occurred due to a renovation that took place during the pandemic that waswas unveiled. Improvements were made to every room, bar and restaurant, with a new one called Awaken Your Senses. A vegan menu at each restaurant was added, and the property introduced the Rockaway Bay Water Park with 26 slides, followed by the Hard Rock Roxity Kids Club on February 7, 2023. Announced in July 2025, REVERB by Hard Rock Punta Cana is slated to open in early 2028.

== Features ==
=== Resort amenities ===
The property separates its rooms in eight buildings, and has 13 pools, four pool bars, a lazy river, the 60,000 sq ft (5,600 m^{2}) Rock Spa, the Rockstar Suite, and an 18-hole golf course designed by Jack Nicklaus. When the resort opened in late January 2011, it had a golf tournament at that golf course. The resort's indoor shopping promenade is known as the Boulevard, which houses the Rock Shop, while the theatre is branded See The Show.

In mid-April 2021, Hard Rock International unveiled the Market Food Hall at the resort, replacing its traditional buffet with a French market modeled after similar ones in New Orleans, a bar with local options, and other food markets themed after Italy, Asia, and Mexico. When the Hard Rock Roxity Kids Club debuted in early February 2023, it featured trampolines, a small theater and kitchen, an indoor basketball court, and is themed after the Hard Rock Roxtars, a children's band that consists of guitarists Styler and Sir Kingston, lead singer Skiddley, motherly keyboardist Razzi, and drummer Buddy Jr.

== Awards ==
- AAA Four Diamond Award (2010–2014)
- World Travel Awards: Caribbean's Leading Hotel Suite (2015–2017)
- Quality Assurance Award from Delta Vacations (2016)
- Successful Meetings Pinnacle Award: Best Food & Beverage Department – International (2016)
- Travel Weekly Magellan Awards: Casino Resort/Hotel (Gold Badge) Spa Design (Gold Badge) (2016)
- Smart Meetings’ Platinum Choice Award (2016)
- TravellanceMedia's Travvy Awards: Best Premium Gaming Hotel/Resort – Caribbean/Bahamas (Gold Badge) (2018)
- Northstar Meetings Group Stella Awards: Best Gaming Property, International & U.S. Territories (2018)
- Prestigious Star Awards: Highly Commended Reception Venue (2019)
- Island Magazine's All-Inclusive Awards: Best Pool, Best Included Amenity (2019)
- Island Magazine's All-Inclusive Awards: Best All-Inclusive Resort Spa (2020)
- Global Gaming Awards: Latin American Property of the Year (2021)
- World Travel Awards: Dominican Republic's Leading Hotel Suite (2023)

== See also ==
- CoCo Key Water Resort and Hard Rock Casino Rockford
- Great Wolf Lodge
- Hard Rock Hotel Riviera Maya
- Hard Rock Hotel & Casino Sacramento at Fire Mountain
- River Spirit Casino Resort
- Universal Orlando
