= Hard Rock Hotel Riviera Maya =

All-inclusive resort in Mexico

- Exterior view, inclement weather (Note: All images were taken March 2014)
- Interactive map of Hard Rock Hotel Riviera Maya
- Location: Riviera Maya, Mexico; Carretera Cancun-Chetumal Km 72, Puerto Aventuras; 20°30′25.097″N 87°12′55.387″W
- Opened: As Aventura Palace: Early 1999; 27 years ago (Aventura Spa Palace); Early 2000s (Aventura Cove Palace); As Hard Rock: October 2013; 13 years ago (soft opening); May 4, 2014; 12 years ago (grand opening)
- Theme: Rock and roll; Tropical Mexican style
- No. of rooms: 1,264
- Signature attractions: Vibe City; Hard Rock Roxity Kids Club; Rockaway Bay Water Park
- Notable restaurants: Toro Steakhouse; The Market Buffet Restaurant; Frida; Le Petit Cochon; Zen; Faro Gastro Market
- Owner: RCD Hotels
- Operating license holder: Hard Rock International
- Architect: Jeffrey Beers International
- Previous names: Aventura Palace (1999–2013)
- Website: hotel.hardrock.com/riviera-maya/

Hard Rock Hotel Riviera Maya is an all-inclusive resort in Riviera Maya, Mexico, owned by RCD Hotels and operated by the Seminole Tribe of Florida-owned Hard Rock International. The hotel opened in May 2014; before then, it operated as Aventura Palace, which opened its first phase in 1999.

The property has since expanded to include family-friendly amenities in the Hacienda section, including Vibe City, Hard Rock Roxity Kids Club, and the Rockaway Bay Water Park. Its sister locations are Hard Rock Hotel & Casino Punta Cana and Hard Rock Hotel Cancun.

== History ==
=== 1999–2014: Development and opening ===
Interior view

On July 22, 1999, Palace Resorts LLC revealed plans for Riviera Maya Palace, an 850-room hotel adjacent to the 474-room Aventura Palace in Riviera Maya, Mexico. The site for the latter was a 75-acre (30 ha) beachfront in the middle of Playa del Carmen and Puerto Aventura. These properties were rebranded as the 489-room Aventura Cove Palace, which was the family-oriented hotel, and the 777-room Aventura Spa Palace, which was strictly for adults. On October 19, 2011, Palace Resorts (which spun off into RCD Resorts after Roberto Chapur split with founder José Chapur) formed a joint venture with the Orlando, Florida-based Hard Rock International, allowing them to license the "Hard Rock" name from Hard Rock Hotel Licensing, Inc. after the successful test run of the Punta Cana location. They announced that the Aventura Palace complex would be rebranded as the Hard Rock Hotel Riviera Maya.

Hard Rock Hotel Riviera Maya held a soft opening in October 2013, and would hold a reflagging ceremony on December 10 of that year. A grand opening celebration took place from May 4 to 6, 2014, with a guitar-smashing ceremony and 1,264 rooms for guests. The adult and family-friendly sides were renamed Heaven and Hacienda, respectively. The Kings of Suburbia and Jon Bon Jovi did a beachside performance live, and the event included the appearances of Haley Reinhart, Casey Abrams, DJ Connor Cruise, Audrina Patridge, Alessandra Ambrosio, DJ Jack Novak, and Scott Disick of Keeping Up with the Kardashians, alongside executives of Hard Rock International, the Seminole Tribe of Florida, and the All Inclusive Collection.

=== 2014–present: After opening ===
At the time of its opening, the property featured nine restaurants, nine lounges, five pools, and an 88,915 sq ft (8,260.5 m^{2}) convention center. All interiors were done by Jeffrey Beers International and took inspiration from the aesthetics of Festival Rock y Ruedas de Avándaro. JBI color coded the Hacienda side of the resort red, while color coding the Heaven side blue.

The all-inclusive resort expanded on December 28, 2018, with the addition of the Rockaway Bay Water Park in the Hacienda area with 23 slides. On July 2, 2024, Thai restaurant WAI, UMO, a Mexican Yucatan eatery, Faro Gastro Market and Arribo Bar were added to Heaven.

== See also ==
- CoCo Key Water Resort and Hard Rock Casino Rockford
- Great Wolf Lodge
- Hard Rock Hotel & Casino Sacramento at Fire Mountain
- River Spirit Casino Resort
