= Hard Rock Hotel and Casino =

American casino resort and hotel franchise

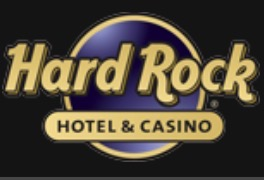
- Type: Division
- Industry: Gaming, hospitality
- Founded: 1995 in Las Vegas (first location); 2007 in Florida (as a division)
- Founder: Hard Rock International
- Headquarters: Davie, Florida, U.S. (Note: Location may also be listed as Hollywood, Florida due to a shared ZIP code.)
- Products: Hotels, casinos
- Brands: Hard Rock Casino; Hard Rock Hotel
- Owner: Seminole Tribe of Florida
- Parent: Hard Rock International
- Divisions: REVERB by Hard Rock; Rocksino by Hard Rock
- Subsidiaries: Hard Rock Hotel Licensing, Inc.
- Website: hotel.hardrock.com; casino.hardrock.com

Hard Rock Hotel and Casino, also stylized as Hard Rock Hotel & Casino, is an American casino resort and hotel franchise. It is an owned division of Hard Rock International, an American hospitality company that also owns the restaurant franchise the Hard Rock Cafe. Hard Rock Hotel and Casino operates a large number of Hard Rock-branded hotels and casinos, and is also involved in various residential projects. Some locations are licensed or operated as joint ventures.

== History ==
=== Background ===
In 1995, Hard Rock Cafe co-founder Peter Morton spent $80 million to open the Hard Rock Hotel near the Las Vegas Strip in Las Vegas, Nevada. A subsequent $100 million expansion in 1999 nearly doubled the hotel's capacity. In May 2006, Morton sold the Hard Rock Hotel & Casino Las Vegas to Morgans Hotel Group for $770 million, including the rights to the Hard Rock Hotel & Casino brand west of the Mississippi, including Texas, California, Australia, and Vancouver, British Columbia, informally known as the "Morton Territories." The hotel began another expansion in 2007 at a cost of $750 million. The project added 875 rooms in two towers and expanded meeting space. In March 2011, Morgans surrendered control of the property to partner Brookfield Asset Management, citing the high debt on the property in the face of the economic downturn. In April 2018, the Hard Rock Hotel in Las Vegas was sold to Richard Branson with plans to renovate the property under the Virgin Hotels brand; Virgin Hotels Las Vegas debuted in March 2021.

=== 2007–2013: Seminole Tribe of Florida ===
Hard Rock International was formed when on December 7, 2006, The Rank Group sold Hard Rock Cafe International to the Seminole Tribe of Florida for $965 million, including 124 Hard Rock Cafes, four Hard Rock Hotels, two Hard Rock Hotel and Casino resorts, two Hard Rock Live concert venues, and stakes in three unbranded hotels. Hard Rock Hotel and Casino operates as a Hard Rock International division.

In 2004, Hard Rock International and Sol Melia Hotels and Resorts launched Lifestar Hoteles España SL, a joint venture that intended to manage Europe's first Hard Rock Hotel in Madrid, but it was never opened as a Hard Rock property upon the dissolution of the joint venture in 2007. The other joint venture hotels in 2007 were in Chicago (in the Carbide & Carbon Building), New York, and San Diego (the San Diego property includes Hard Rock condominiums). In 2007, the Seminole Tribe of Florida owned and operated all units except the Sioux City, Tulsa, Biloxi, and Las Vegas properties. Hard Rock also operated hotels and resorts in Orlando, Florida (a joint venture with Loews Hotels and Universal Destinations & Experiences); Bali, Indonesia; and Pattaya, Thailand, (a joint venture with Ong Beng Seng/Hotel Properties Limited). Hard Rock International continued to expand internationally (including hotels, casinos, resorts, and condominiums) through several joint ventures (Becker Ventures, Ong Beng Seng/Hotel Properties Limited and Loews Hotels), including hotels in Chicago, Bali, Orlando, Penang, San Diego, Singapore, and planned openings in Abu Dhabi, Cancun, Dubai, Hungary, Panama, Punta Cana and Puerto Vallarta, as well as hotel-casinos in Hollywood, Florida; Tampa, Florida; Las Vegas, Nevada; and Catoosa, Oklahoma, just northeast of Tulsa.

The Hard Rock Casino in Biloxi, MS is owned and managed by Bally's Corporation. Opened on January 20, 2010, in Singapore at Sentosa, the Hard Rock Hotel at Resorts World Sentosa is owned by the Genting Group. On November 1, 2010, Hard Rock International unveiled its first all-inclusive resort known as Hard Rock Hotel & Casino Punta Cana.

=== 2014–2020: Rebrandings and expansion ===
The Hotel Zoso in Palm Springs, California was converted into a 160-room Hard Rock Hotel and opened in 2014. It subsequently closed. A location in Atlantic City, New Jersey was planned in 2010, but those plans were canceled in 2012; however, in 2017, they acquired the closed Trump Taj Mahal from Icahn Enterprises, which in 2018 was reopened as Hard Rock Hotel & Casino Atlantic City.

Hard Rock Hotel Ibiza in Playa d'en Bossa, Ibiza, Spain had a soft opening on May 18, 2014, followed by a grand opening on June 20, 2014. In 2015, Hard Rock announced a new hotel in Bogotá, Colombia, which will open in 2019. The company had plans to open in the biggest financial district in Colombia, the Centro Internacional, but it revised those plans. The hotel would be located in the exclusive Zona Rosa de Bogotá, home of luxury boutiques. Hard Rock Hotel Chicago would close permanently on November 30, 2017, to undergo a rebranding as St. Jane Chicago Hotel, now Pendry Chicago as of May 2021.

Then in early 2019, it was announced that Jack Cincinnati Casino in Cincinnati was sold for $745 million to Vici Properties and Hard Rock International, with Vici acquiring the land and buildings for $558 million and Hard Rock buying the operating business for $187 million. Hard Rock would lease the casino from Vici for $43 million per year, and would rebrand it as Hard Rock Casino Cincinnati.

In July 2019, Hard Rock International announced plans for a casino in Rockford, Illinois, about 75 miles west of Chicago along I-90, developed on the former site of the Clock Tower Resort, infamous for housing an, at the time, heavily vandalized and defunct CoCo Key Water Resort before it was torn down. Two other proposals were made for the city's lone casino license, but the city council only recommended the Hard Rock proposal to the Illinois Gaming Board, who would decide which site will get the license. The temporary casino, named Rockford Casino-A Hard Rock Opening Act, opened on November 10, 2021. It features a Rock Shop, Hard Rock memorabilia, slots, and two restaurants. The permanent casino was planned to open within two years and feature a Hard Rock Cafe, live music venue, 90-foot-tall replica of a Rick Nielson guitar, and will be a full-fledge Hard Rock Casino.

In November 2019, Hard Rock Hotel & Casino Sacramento at Fire Mountain opened adjacent to the Toyota Amphitheatre in Wheatland, California. Also in November, Hard Rock announced a new hotel in São Paulo, Brazil, in the heart of popular Paulista Avenue.

=== 2021–present: Recent and pending projects ===
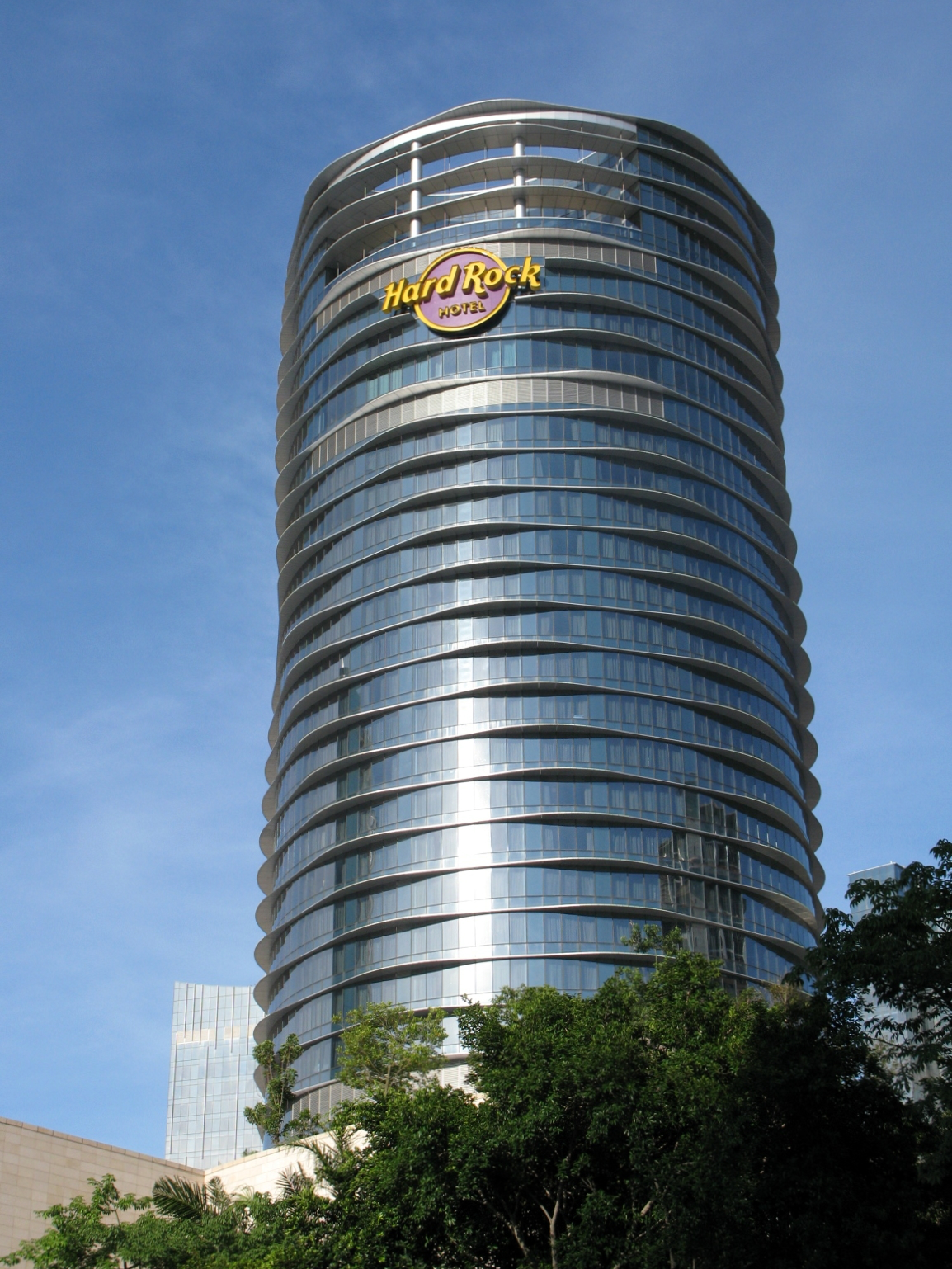
Hard Rock Hotel Macau (now The Countdown Hotel)

In January 2021, it was announced that Hard Rock will be opening a new hotel in London, Ontario, Canada, with a 353-room hotel slated to finish construction in 2025. It will be located in the 100 Kellogg Lane complex.

In May 2021, a $300 million Hard Rock Casino location opened in Gary, Indiana about 35 minutes east of Chicago. Branded as Hard Rock Casino Northern Indiana, the location includes memorabilia from local natives Jackson 5 and a 1,950-seat Hard Rock Live performance hall.

In December 2021, Hard Rock purchased The Mirage from MGM Resorts for $1.075 billion. The deal closed in December 2022. The Las Vegas Strip property will be completely renovated, but was permitted to keep using "The Mirage" name for up to three years. A new 36-story hotel tower in the shape of a guitar, like the one at the Seminole Hard Rock, would be added. After renovations, the plan is to reopen the hotel under the name Hard Rock Las Vegas in 2027.

Hard Rock is currently developing the Hard Rock Hotel & Casino Athens in Athens, Greece. It will become the first integrated resort in continental Europe when it opens in 2027. Hard Rock is also currently developing non-gaming hotels in Ras Al Khaimah, United Arab Emirates and Malta. The temporary Rockford Casino closed on August 12, 2024, and Hard Rock Casino Rockford had its grand opening on August 29 of that year. A hotel was planned for the casino in 2025, but plans for a $103 million hotel and convention center expansion did not come until May 2026. Leonardo Hotels acquired and closed Hard Rock Hotel Dublin in August 2024; the hotel only operated for four years.

Hard Rock is one of multiple bidders who are bidding for one of three casino licenses for Downstate New York. Hard Rock is looking to build an integrated resort called Hard Rock Hotel & Casino Metropolitan Park adjacent to Citi Field in Flushing, New York. Hard Rock Hotel Ibiza would close on October 2, 2025, to undergo a rebrand as BLESS Ibiza The Site.

== Assets and divisions ==
=== Rocksino by Hard Rock ===
Logo used from 2023–present

In December 2013, Hard Rock International opened Hard Rock Rocksino Northfield Park, it being the brand's first racino adjacent to the historic Northfield Park harness racing track near Cleveland, Ohio.

The Rocksino concept was designed to focus heavily on electronic gaming, live music, and dining while adapting to fit regional laws or smaller buildings where a standard Hard Rock Hotel & Casino is incompatible. The Northfield Park location was rebranded MGM Northfield Park after MGM Growth Properties acquired it for over $1 billion.

The concept was revived in August 2023, when Rocksino by Hard Rock Deadwood opened in the historic Wild West town of Deadwood, South Dakota. It operates inside the historic Hickok's Hotel & Gaming building, with 86 slot machines and 22 hotel rooms.

=== REVERB by Hard Rock ===
Logo used from 2020–present

On December 15, 2020, Hard Rock International opened the 195-room REVERB Downtown Atlanta nearby Mercedes-Benz Stadium, designed as an advanced hotel format for modern music fans and digital content creators.

The REVERB by Hard Rock Hamburg opened in July 2024 in the historic Flakturm IV (St. Pauli Bunker), which was built by the Nazis in 1942. A five-story, pyramid-shaped expansion was built vertically on top of the existing structure, which the REVERB hotel occupies. Announced in July 2025, Hard Rock plans to open more REVERB hotels in Florence, AL, Tampa, Punta Cana, Scottsdale, Pensacola, Kalamazoo, and Mazatlán, which are slated to open in early 2028.

=== Hard Rock Hotel & Residences ===
Announced in July 2025, the division launched a new mixed-use concept that integrates a hotel alongside permanent or long-term private residences, which includes Hard Rock Hotel & Residences Ras Al Khaimah in the United Arab Emirates (UAE), projected to debut in 2028. A location in the U.S., known as Hard Rock Hotel & Residences Lake Texoma in Kingston, Oklahoma, is slated to open in the spring of 2027.

== Gallery ==
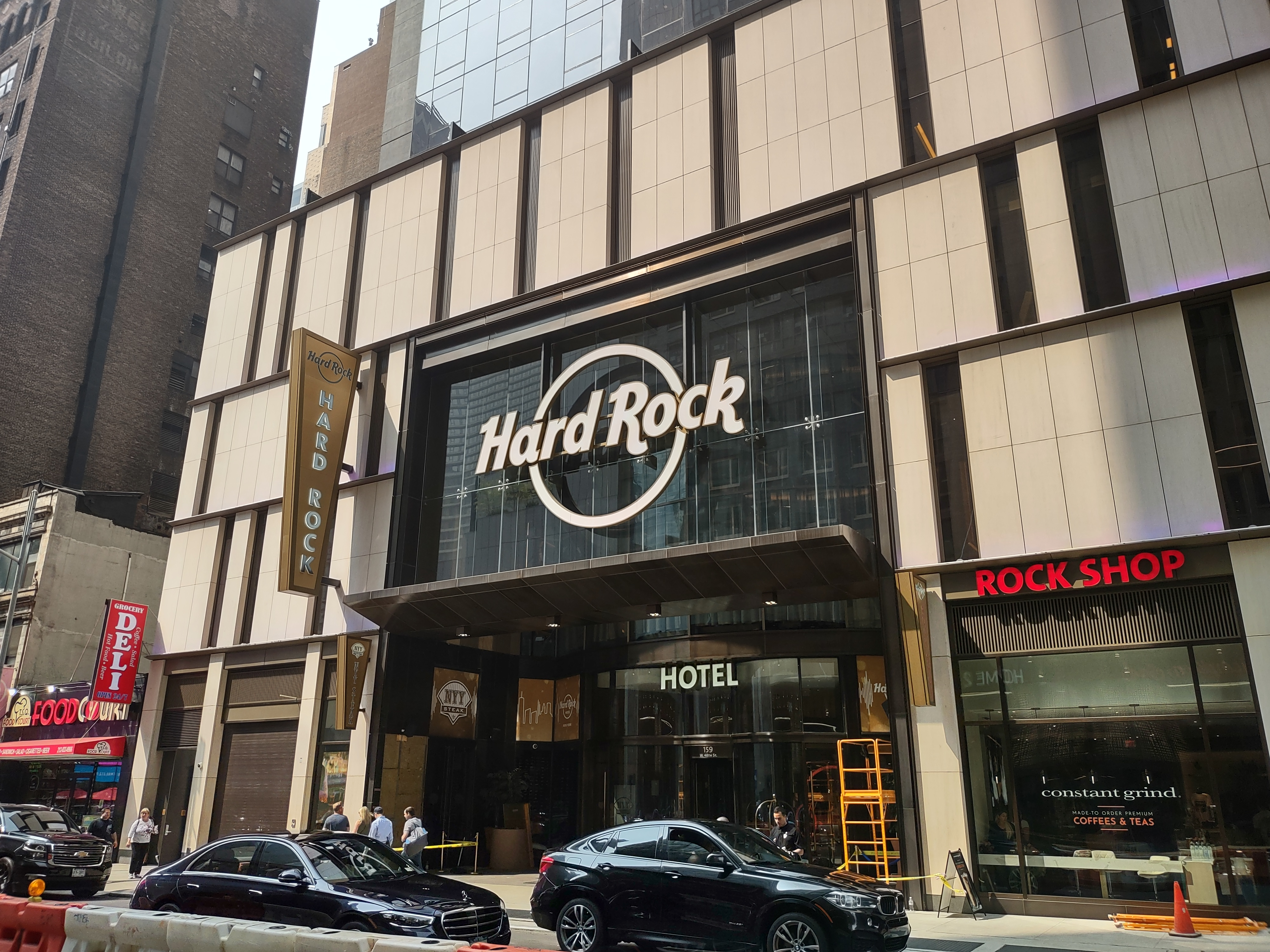
Hard Rock Hotel New York

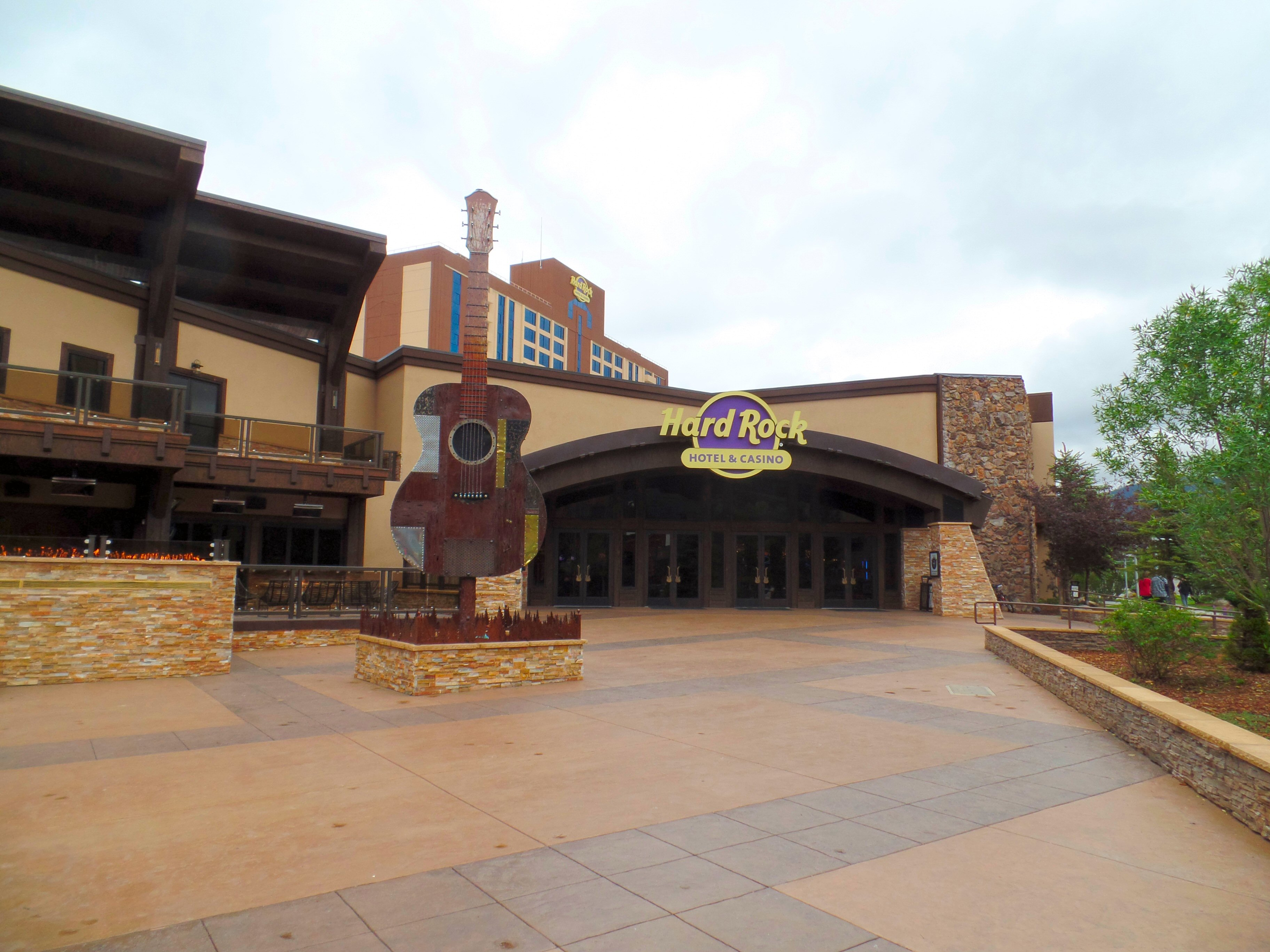
Hard Rock Hotel & Casino Lake Tahoe

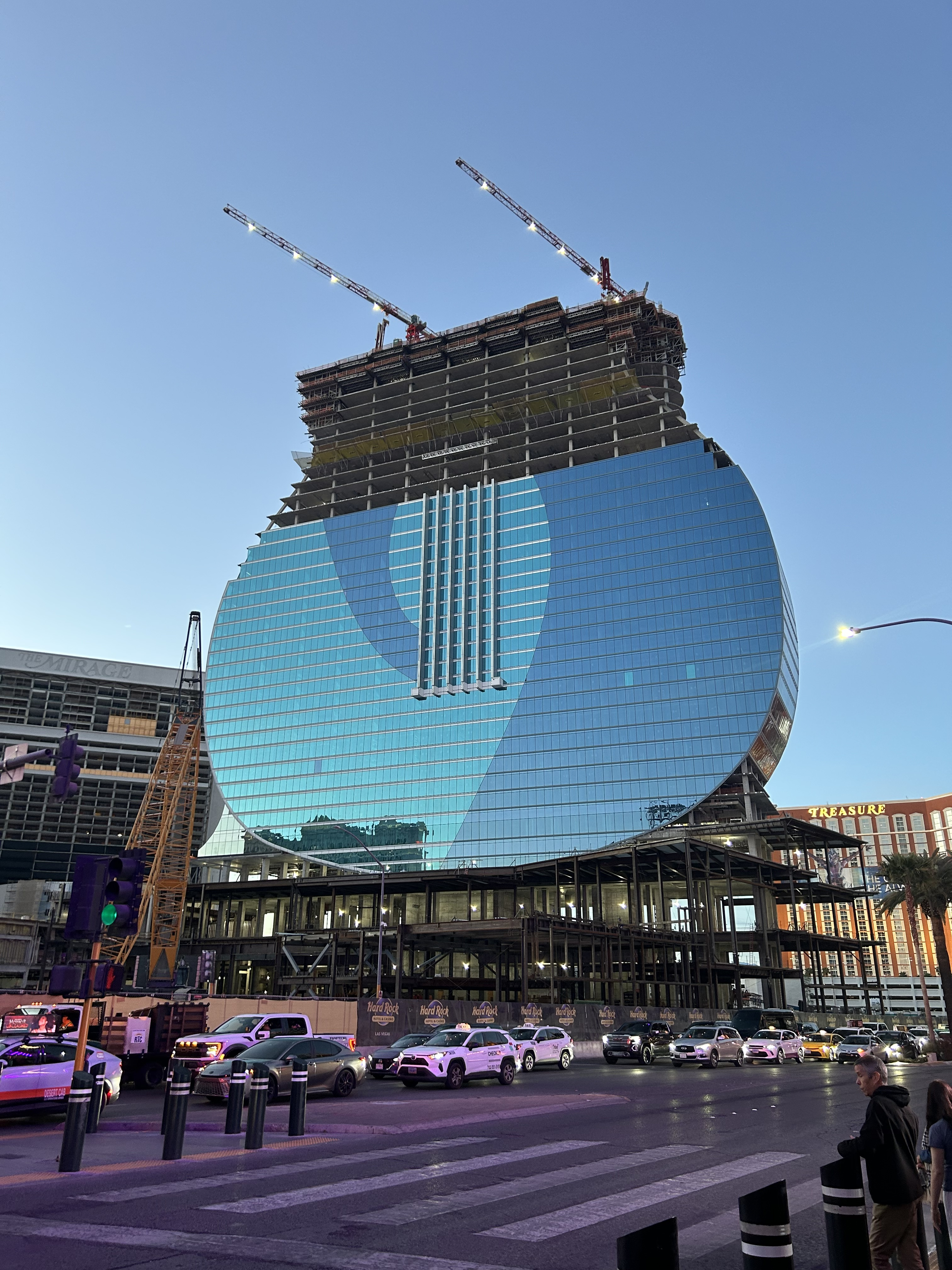
Hard Rock Las Vegas under construction

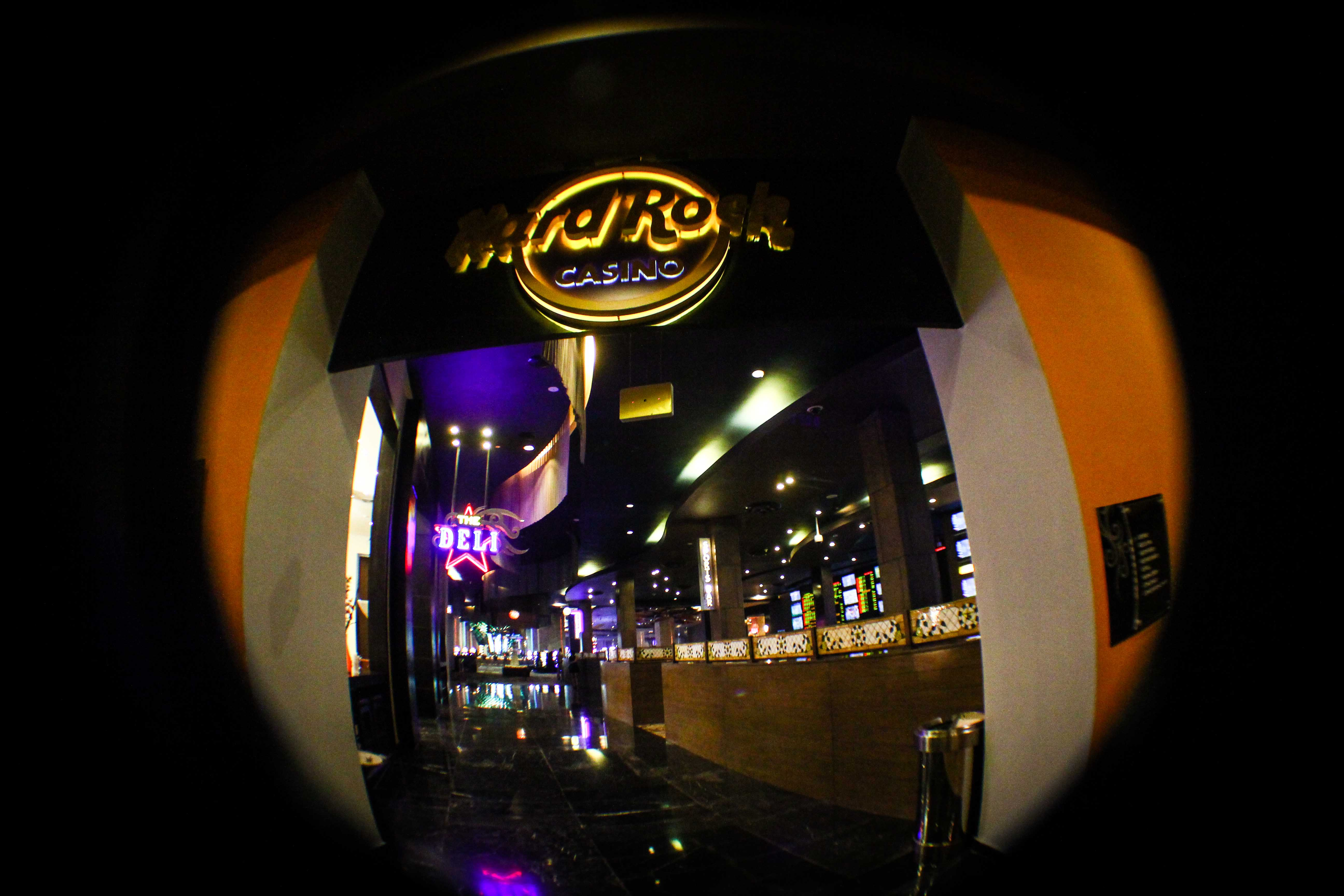
Interior entrance to Hard Rock Casino Punta Cana
