= Uvero Alto =

Beach in the Dominican Republic

Coordinates: 18°49′N 68°35′W

Uvero Alto is a beach and resort area located at the north end of the tourist town Punta Cana in the province of La Altagracia in the Dominican Republic. A number of all-inclusive resort hotels are built along these beaches on the east coast of Hispaniola.
