= Hard Rock International =

American restaurant and entertainment conglomerate

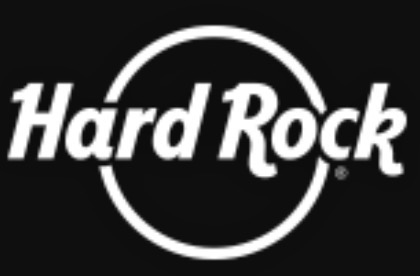
- Formerly: Hard Rock Cafe International (1977–2007)
- Industry: Casual dining restaurants; Casinos; Hotels; Beach clubs; Nightlife
- Founded: October 17, 1977; 49 years ago
- Founders: Peter Morton; Isaac Tigrett
- Headquarters: Davie, Florida, U.S. (Note: Location may also be listed as Hollywood, Florida due to a shared ZIP code.)
- Number of locations: 165 restaurants, 24 hotels, and 11 casinos
- Area served: International
- Key people: Jim Allen (president and CEO of Hard Rock International (HRI) and Seminole Gaming (SGA))
- Owner: Seminole Tribe of Florida
- Number of employees: 4,800 (2020)
- Divisions: Hard Rock Cafe; Hard Rock Hotel and Casino; Hard Rock Beach Club; Hard Rock Games; Seminole Hard Rock Entertainment; Hard Rock Bet; Hard Rock Digital; Hard Rock Roxtars; Hard Rock Live; Rock Shop
- Subsidiaries: NYY Steak (via Seminole Hard Rock Entertainment; 50/50 joint venture with the New York Yankees)
- Website: www.hardrock.com

Hard Rock International is an American conglomerate that owns restaurants, hotels, and casinos. Formed in 2007 when the Seminole Tribe of Florida purchased Hard Rock Cafe assets from the Rank Group, Hard Rock International owns the Hard Rock Cafe restaurant franchise, as well as the Hard Rock Hotel and Casino company.

As of April 2026, Hard Rock International has venues in over 80 countries, including over 300 bar or cafe-restaurants, 43 hotels, and over 40 casinos. Among other hotels, in 2021, Hard Rock International purchased The Mirage for $1.075 billion and is in the process of redeveloping it into Hard Rock Las Vegas.

== History ==
=== Background ===
Hard Rock Cafe International was incorporated in 1977 by Peter Morton and Isaac Tigrett after the Hard Rock Cafe brand was rapidly expanding. They first became involved in hotel ownership in the 1990s.

=== 2006–2007: Seminole Tribe of Florida ===
On December 7, 2006, The Rank Group announced that they would sell Hard Rock Cafe International to the Seminole Tribe of Florida for $965 million. Included in the deal were 124 Hard Rock Cafes, four Hard Rock Hotels, two Hard Rock Hotel and Casino Hotels, two Hard Rock Live concert venues, and stakes in three unbranded hotels. Rank retained the Hard Rock Casino in London, and rebranded it the G Casino Piccadilly. The Hard Rock Hotel & Casino in Las Vegas was not part of the deal because it was separately founded by Hard Rock founder, Peter Morgan, and later sold to Morgans Hotel Group.

The final takeover was mired in controversy, due to a payment clause in a contract with one casino developer, Power Plant Entertainment, an affiliate of Coastal Development and the Baltimore, Maryland-based Cordish Companies, which built the Hollywood and Tampa resorts. Power Plant and the Seminoles announced a settlement in April 2007 which both sides called equitable. On January 8, 2007, Rank shareholders approved the Seminoles' $965 million offer, and the deal was finalized on March 11, 2007. After the sale, Hard Rock Cafe International was renamed to simply Hard Rock International to reflect its expanded focus beyond cafes.

=== 2008–present: Expansions ===
On June 22, 2008, the Seminole Hard Rock Hotel & Casino Hollywood began "Vegas-style" table gambling in addition to the Class II slots already in operation. To win approval for the table games, which were barred under Florida law, the Seminole Tribe paid the State of Florida $100 million as part of a 25-year pact signed by Governor Charlie Crist. On July 3, 2008, the Florida Supreme Court ruled that the governor's agreement was unconstitutional, but table games continue to operate because the federal Department of the Interior approved the now-invalid pact with the state. In mid-August 2016, Hard Rock International signed an 18-year naming rights agreement for the Miami Dolphins' home Sun Life Stadium in Miami Gardens, which would be renamed Hard Rock Stadium. Later in September 2016, Hard Rock International acquired the "Hard Rock" casino and hotel-casino rights for the western United States.

A similar issue stemmed with sports betting in Florida under the Hard Rock Bet app. Through a new gaming compact, the Seminole Tribe began to offer off-grounds sports betting. Once live in 2021, lawsuits caused the Seminole Tribe to halt operations. Relaunching in November 2023 for returning players, the Seminole Tribe of Florida now operates online sports betting too.

In 2021, its division Hard Rock Hotel and Casino acquired The Mirage for $1.075 billion. Other projects include the Hard Rock Hotel & Casino in Athens, and Hard Rock Casino Cincinnati, among others. It has been bidding to build an integrated resort called Hard Rock Hotel & Casino Metropolitan Park adjacent to Citi Field in Flushing, New York.

== Assets and divisions ==
Hard Rock International owns several assets and divisions, alongside licensed projects and ones that have been defunct.

=== Active ===
==== Hard Rock Beach Club ====
Hard Rock Beach Club remains a division of Hard Rock International, though it is no longer a permanent, nightlife beach attraction; as of May 2022, it has operated as a pop-up venue at the F1 Miami Grand Prix, featuring a concert stage.

==== Hard Rock Hotels and Casinos ====
The company's hospitality division owns and manages properties such as The Mirage (which is undergoing redevelopment by them as Hard Rock Las Vegas (Note: Not to be confused with the original location, being Hard Rock Hotel and Casino (Las Vegas).)), among others. Properties that do not have both casinos and hotels, such as Hard Rock Casino Cincinnati and Hard Rock Hotel New York, operate under the standalone Hard Rock Casino and Hard Rock Hotel brandings. Many Hard Rock-branded hotels are owned and/or operated by third parties.

The Hard Rock Hotel Orlando is located at Universal Orlando and is owned by a joint venture of Loews Hotels, Universal Destinations & Experiences, and Hard Rock International, and is operated by Loews Hotels.

==== Hard Rock Cafe ====
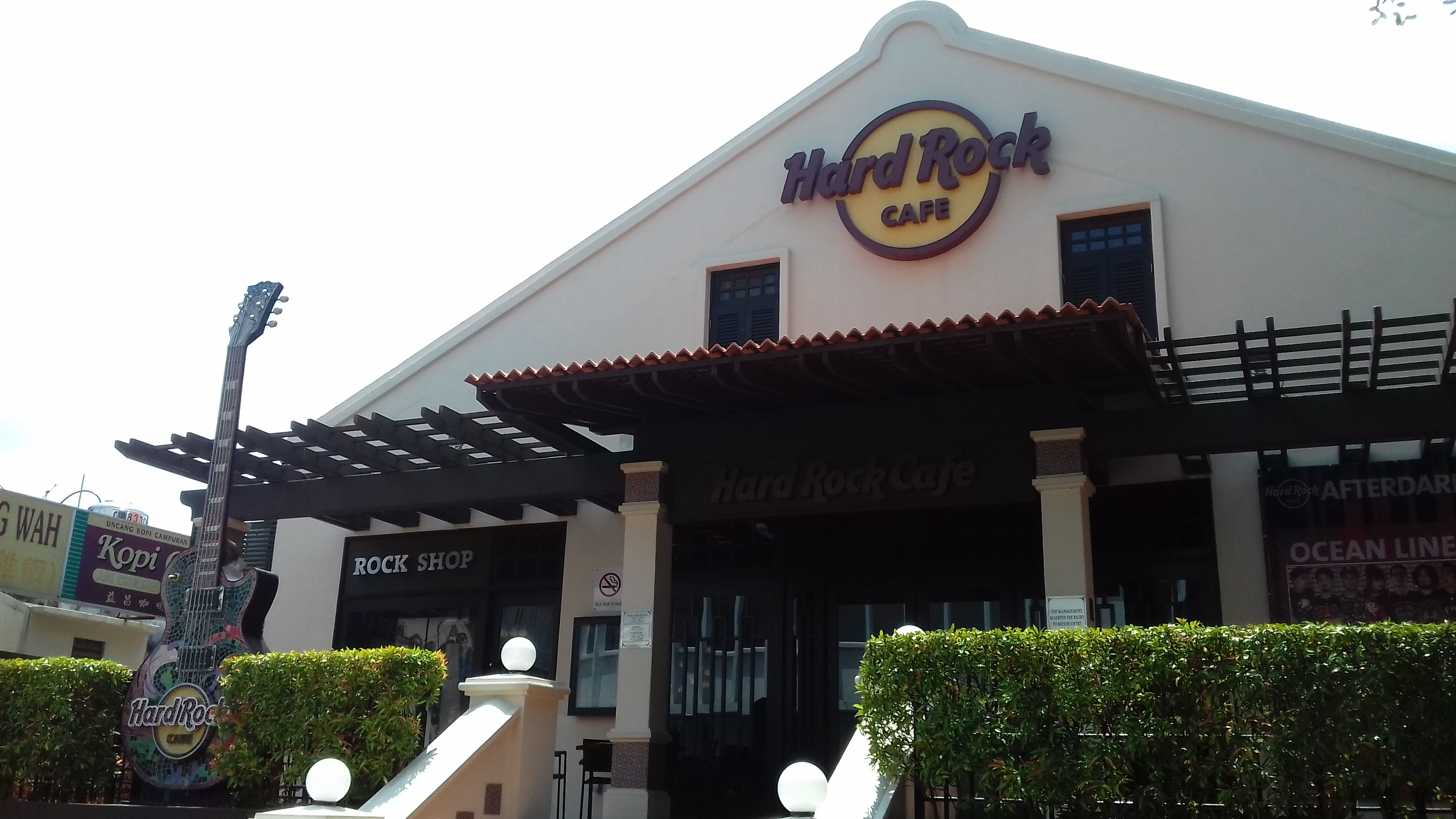
Hard Rock Cafe in Malacca City

The Hard Rock Cafe, an American hard rock theme restaurant formed in 1971 in London, and later franchised internationally.

==== Hard Rock Club ====
The Hard Rock Club is a sponsored bar at the Canadian Tire Centre stadium, with Hard Rock branding and memorabilia. The stadium formerly housed Ottawa's first Hard Rock Cafe when it opened as The Palladium on January 15, 1996, and for many years when it was known as the Corel Centre. The cafe closed on August 8, 2002, and was replaced with the Frank Finnigan's restaurant. Since October 17, 2013, the restaurant is known as Chek Point, and is sponsored by SportChek. The Hard Rock Club bar was announced on October 9, 2018, and opened near the former Hard Rock Cafe. The bar features memorabilia from over a dozen artists, restaurant-style seating, and dedicated stadium seating.

==== Seminole Hard Rock Entertainment ====
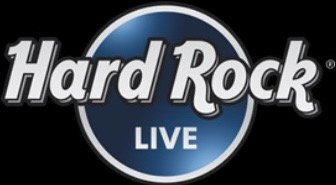
Logo used from 2019–present

Hard Rock Live started as a 3,000-seat arena next to the Hard Rock Cafe at Universal CityWalk Orlando, which would have its grand opening on March 12, 1999. The second Hard Rock Live was the 5,500-seat arena at the Seminole Hard Rock Hotel & Casino Hollywood's Seminole Paradise shopping plaza and entertainment district. The mall opened on January 14, 2005, while the arena opened on July 12 of that year, both developed by Cordish. Prior to the finalization of the Seminole Tribe of Florida acquisition in March 2007, Seminole Hard Rock Entertainment, Inc. was formed by the Rank Group on December 22, 2006 to operate Hard Rock Live locations.

The Hollywood, FL arena closed its doors on February 24, 2018 as part of the Guitar Hotel expansion, which would include a completely rebuilt 7,000-seat arena of the same name. Hard Rock Live at Mark G. Ettes Arena at Hard Rock Hotel & Casino Atlantic City opened on June 29 of that year. The rebuilt Hard Rock Live Hollywood, FL would open on October 24, 2019, with a concert from the Maroon 5. Meanwhile, a smaller convention center concept, known as the Hard Rock Event Center, opened at the Tampa, FL location on October 3, 2019, with a concert from Keith Urban. Hard Rock Event Center Cincinnati opened at the Hard Rock Casino Cincinnati on October 29, 2021.

Hard Rock Live Sacramento opened in June 2022 at the Hard Rock Hotel & Casino Sacramento at Fire Mountain, designed by Scéno Plus. Hard Rock Live Rockford debuted alongside Hard Rock Casino Rockford on August 29, 2024, operated in collaboration with Live Nation.

==== Hard Rock Roxtars ====
The Roxtars are a band of five cartoon characters created by Hard Rock International to serve as mascots for children's amenities at Hard Rock Cafes and Hard Rock Hotels, launched in October 2014 and have plushies.

The group consists of Skiddley, the main singer, Razzi, who is a motherly keyboardist popular for squishy hugs, Styler and Sir Kingston, who both are guitarists and the latter being inspired by the British, and Buddy Jr., the drummer.

The Roxtars are featured in select hotels worldwide, the majority of them being international all-inclusive locations, in a childcare and entertainment program known as the Hard Rock Roxity Kids Club, located at the Hard Rock Hotel & Casino Punta Cana, Hard Rock Hotel Bali, Hard Rock Hotel Los Cabos, Hard Rock Hotel Tenerife, and Hard Rock Hotel Riviera Maya.

==== Rock Shop and Hard Rock Store ====
Hard Rock International's Rock Shop concept was invented in 1974 as a retail counter at the Hard Rock Cafe's first location in London after it sponsored a local sports team in 1973, creating a simple T-shirt with their logo as the uniform. The larger Hard Rock Store concept was born as a larger retail storefront in the company's resorts.

=== Defunct ===
==== Hard Rock Bar ====
Logo from 2004–2009

In March 2004, Hard Rock Cafe International announced that they would open a smaller, nightlife-themed cafe in Bristol, UK, known as the Hard Rock Bar. It was one of the first global locations where the company altered its logo and dropped "Cafe" in favor of "Bar". The restaurant opened on April 8, 2004 and closed permanently on January 2, 2006 after failing to gain a long-term footprint. Another location opened at the Hyderabad Airport on March 23, 2008, but also immediately ceased operations on August 18, 2009.

==== Hard Rock Beach Club Choctaw ====
In January 2003, Hard Rock Cafe International signed a licensing agreement with Choctaw tribe, led by Chief Phillip Martin, to expand the Pearl River Resort in Choctaw, Neshoba County, Mississippi. They opened Hard Rock Beach Club directly adjacent to the tribe's Geyser Falls Water Theme Park on Pushmataha Lake in June of that year, with Hard Rock owning the 9-acre (3.6 ha) private beach and the tribe retaining ownership of the property.

A 300-room Hard Rock Hotel would be Phase II of the project, aggressively scheduled to open by 2006 and would have become the third major hotel tower at the Pearl River Resort, alongside the Silver Star and Golden Moon casino hotels. However, the beachclub permanently closed on January 24, 2005, as it failed to property attract tourists. Hard Rock International never fully explained the reason for the sudden closure or the cancellation of the hotel plans. The spiritual successor to this project is the Hard Rock Hotel & Casino Biloxi.

==== Hard Rock Vault ====
In December 2002, (Note: This source cites a January 2003 opening date, but official news outlets claim the opening took place in December 2002.) Hard Rock Cafe International opened a standalone, 17,000-square-foot (1,600 m^{2}) interactive museum known as the Hard Rock Vault at 8437 International Drive in Orlando, Florida, inside an inverted pyramid building that formerly held the Guinness Book of World Records Experience. The concept was designed to display prized possessions that didn't fit in local cafes (Rock Shop), functioning as a rock-and-roll museum where "Vault Tour Guides" took guests through heavily guarded, climate-controlled rooms filled with iconic guitars, outfits, and handwritten lyrics.

In March 2004, when Hard Rock International hired new CEO Hamish A. Dodds, he immediately began evaluating the company's non-core business assets to eliminate underperforming concepts. The Vault suffered competition from the world's largest Hard Rock Cafe Orlando at Universal CityWalk; particularly, the museum charged an admission fee of $14.95 per person, which tourists did not want to pay just to see music memorabilia that they could easily see for free at a traditional Hard Rock Cafe. Because of this, the Vault permanently shut down on September 30, 2004, and Hard Rock transferred the artifacts to their nationwide cafes.

The facility it was housed in, being Mercado Shopping Center, was over 60% vacant and was eventually demolished in late 2007 through early 2008, alongside the inverted pyramid structure, which temporarily housed a Titanic museum. The site now houses Icon Park.

== Political activities and lobbying ==
In 2025, Hard Rock International was one of the donors who funded the White House's East Wing demolition and planned building of a ballroom.
