= Ramón Antonio Ramírez =

Dominican politician

Ramón Antonio Ramírez (Manolito)
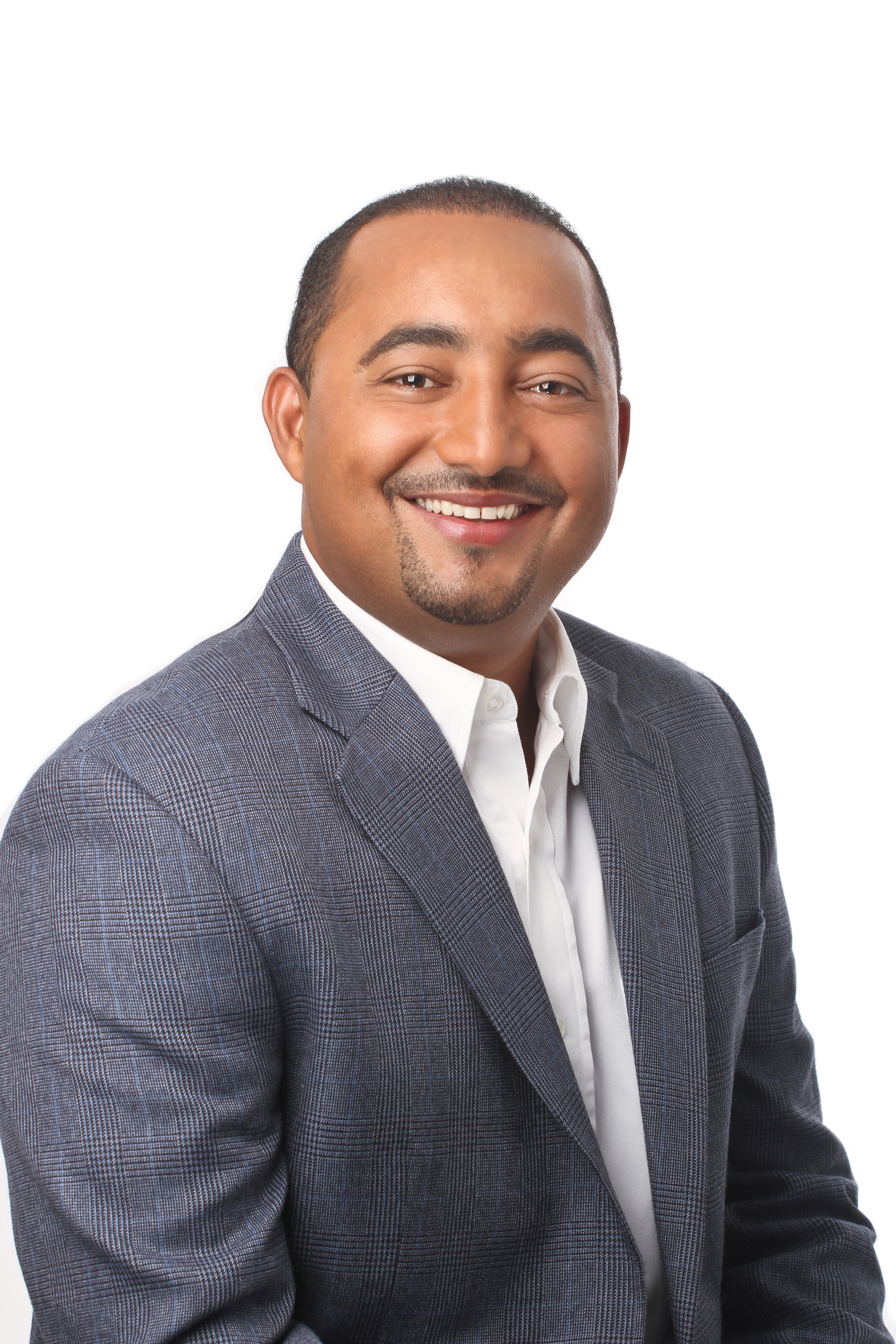

3rd District Director of Verón—Punta Cana
- Incumbent
- Assumed office 16 August 2016
- Vice directrixes: 1. María Verón (2016–2020); 2. Ángela María Rivera (2020–2024); 3. Carmen Lidia Valdez (2024–present)
- Preceded by: Radhamés Carpio

Personal details
- Born: 20 October 1974 (age 51) La Romana, Dominican Republic
- Spouse: Wendy Ruth Gómez Banks
- Children: 3
- Education: Pedro Henríquez Ureña National University
- Occupation: Politician, businessman

Ramón Antonio Ramírez, nicknamed Manolito (born 20 October 1974), is a Dominican politician and businessman. Since 2016, he serves as the village director of Verón-Punta Cana. Ramírez, a member of the Dominican Liberation Party, is running to the Senate of the Dominican Republic for the 2028 election.

== Early life ==
Ramírez is the son of Manolo Ramírez (Pupilo) and Kenia Yoannes de la Rosa Molina (Morena). He was born on October 20, 1974, in La Romana, Dominican Republic. His siblings are Jenny Ramírez de la Rosa, Hendrick Ramírez de la Rosa and Nikauris Ramirez de la Rosa. Manolito was educated in Higüey at the College of Our Lady of Altagracia and completed his university studies at the Universidad Nacional Pedro Henríquez Ureña, obtaining a degree in Systems Engineering.

== Career ==
=== Business ===
Ramírez began his career in his family's business, the transportation and service company ALTTOURS, where he worked beginning in 1997. Starting at the lowest position, he climbed the ladder to the ranks of management, so that today he holds the position of manager.

Ramírez was president of the Dominican Association of Tourist Transporters (ADOTRATUR) from 2000 to 2014. In 2014 he was elected to the presidency of the National Federation of Tourist Services (FENASETUR). During his tenure at ADOTRATUR, he helped solve relevant problems in the area of tourist transport that affected the area.

=== Politics ===
Ramirez became involved in local politics in the municipality of Verón in November 2013 accepting the nomination from the Movimiento Socio Político Nueva Generación [New Generation Socio-Political Movement], later gaining the endorsement from the Partido de la Liberación Dominicana [Dominican Liberation Party] after winning the Municipal District primary elections of December 13, 2015. He won the general election in May 2016, getting more than 50% of the votes, to be elected as the District Director for the period 2016 - 2020. In this position he has accomplished much in a short time, implementing high-impact management changes.

In October 2016, Ramírez was named Vice President of the Federación Dominicana de Distritos Municipales [Dominican Federation of Municipal Districts] (FEDODIM) at their annual Congreso Pedro Reynoso.

== Personal ==
Ramirez is married to Wendy Ruth Gómez Banks, a lawyer, with whom he has three children: Wendely Manely Ramirez Gomez, Mariely Isabella Ramirez Gomez and Isanely Paulette Ramirez Gomez.
