= Macao Beach =

Beach in the Dominican Republic

Coordinates: 18.7739°N 68.5371°W

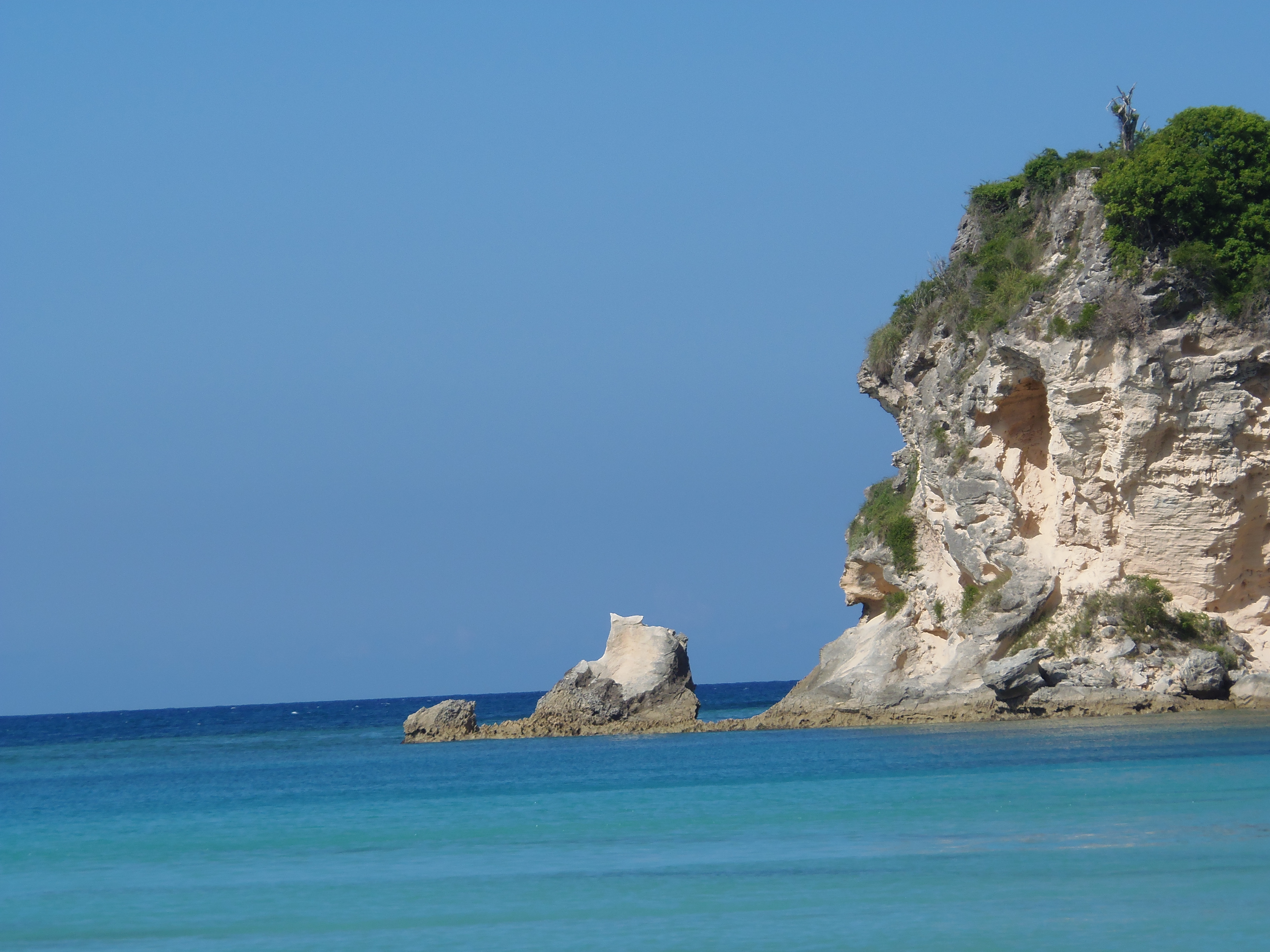
Macao Beach.

Macao Beach, or Playa Macao, is a public beach located in the province La Altagracia in the east region of the Dominican Republic. It is popular among locals and visitors for its white sands, clear waters, and adventure. This is a popular destinations for buggy and four wheels riders and surfers. This is one of the only beaches of the Dominican Republic apt for surfing.

== Climate ==
Macao Beach like its surroundings in the Dominican Republic and the Caribbean as a whole, has warm average temperatures. The table below contains the average temperatures per year of this beach.

Average	January	February	March	April	May	June	July	August	September	October	November	December
High	29 °C 84 °F	29 °C 85 °F	30 °C 86 °F	31 °C 87 °F	31 °C 88 °F	32 °C 90 °F	32 °C 90 °F	32 °C 90 °F	33 °C 91 °F	32 °C 90 °F	31 °C 87 °F	29 °C 84 °F
Low	20 °C 68 °F	20 °C 68 °F	20 °C 69 °F	21 °C 70 °F	22 °C 72 °F	23 °C 73 °F	23 °C 74 °F	23 °C 74 °F	23 °C 73 °F	22 °C 72 °F	22 °C 71 °F	21 °C 69 °F

== See also ==
Punta Cana
