= Punta Cana =

Resort town in La Altagracia Province, Dominican Republic

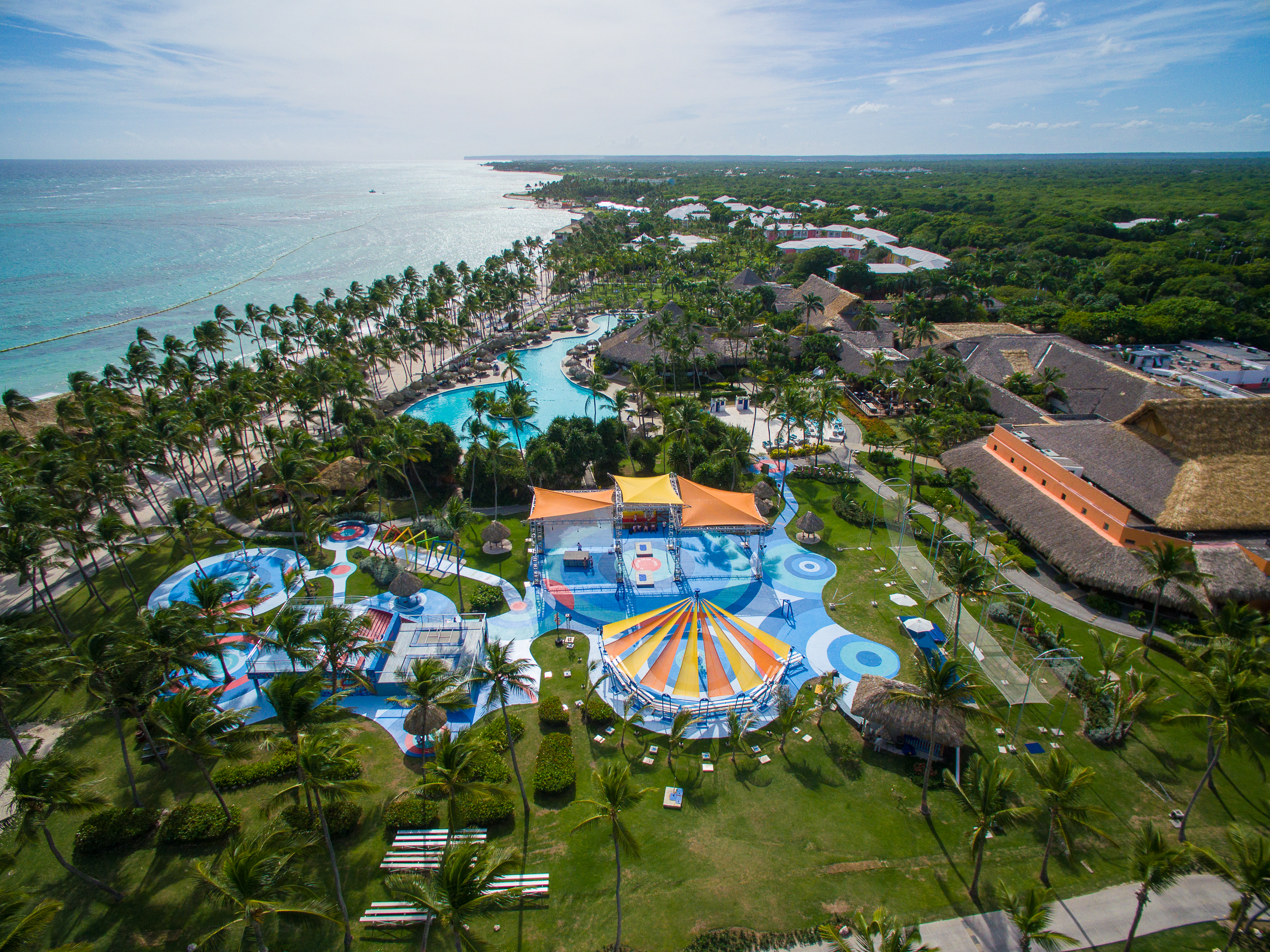
- Aerial view of Club Med resort in Punta Cana

- Punta Cana in the Dominican Republic
- Coordinates: 18°32′N 68°22′W
- Country: Dominican Republic
- Province: La Altagracia
- Municipality: Higüey
- Incorporated (town): 27 June 2006

Government
  - Director of Verón–Punta Cana: Ramón Antonio Ramírez (Dominican Liberation Party, 2016–2028)

Area
  - Total: 475.3 km^{2} (183.5 sq mi)

Population (2022)
  - Total: 138,919
  - Density: 292.3/km^{2} (757.0/sq mi)
- Time zone: UTC−4 (Atlantic)
- Area codes: 809, 829, and 849

Punta Cana is a resort town in the easternmost region of the Dominican Republic. It was politically incorporated as the "Verón–Punta Cana Touristic Municipal District" in 2006, and it is subject to the municipality of Higüey (La Altagracia Province). According to the 2022 census, this township or district had a population of 138,919 inhabitants.

Punta Cana is the second-most popular tourist destination in Latin America, with more visitors than any other city in the Caribbean region. Punta Cana International Airport is located about 3 kilometres (1.9 mi) inland, on the highway that leads from Higüey to La Romana. This airport receives 64% of all flights that arrive in the Dominican Republic, receiving more passengers than the Las Américas International Airport, located in Santo Domingo, the country's capital.

The area is known for its white sand beaches, blue turquoise waters, and balnearios which face both the Caribbean Sea and the Atlantic Ocean. The weather is hot for most of the year, especially in late summer and autumn when the Northern Tropics receive their most direct sunlight.

== Geography and climate ==
The Punta Cana PMO area has an estimated population of 100,000, with an annual growth rate of 11% as of 2011. To the north, it borders the village and beach of Cabeza de Toro, and the Bávaro and El Cortecito beaches. The nearest city, the 500-year-old Higüey, is 45 kilometres (28 mi) away, which takes about an hour to reach by car. European entrepreneurs, particularly Spanish hotel chains, own all but two of the over 50 megaresorts at the Punta Cana tourism destination.

The province's 100-kilometre (62 mi) coastline tends to be mildly windy. The ocean waters are mainly shallows, with several natural marine pools in which visitors can bathe without danger. From north to south, the main beaches are Uvero Alto, Macao, Arena Gorda, Bávaro, El Cortecito, Las Corales, and Cabeza de Toro, all north of the cape; and Cabo Engaño, Punta Cana, and Juanillo south of the cape.

Bávaro is the area starting from Cabeza de Toro until Macao Beach. As the hotels started to rise along the east coast, Bavaro itself became a center of services with shopping malls, fast-food stores, drug stores, fine restaurants, banks, clinics, workshops, supermarkets, and schools. The major town in the district is Veron, now bigger than Higüey in territory, a spontaneous—and poor—urban development running along the original road from the west. Verón, last name of the French proprietor of a timberline business in the early 1930s, is now the base-city for hotel workers and related. It has, besides Bávaro, one of only four gas stations in Punta Cana: the next one is located 48 kilometres (30 mi) west in Higüey, at the Fruisa crossroads; a new Texaco gas station opened in April 2010, 3 kilometres (1.9 mi) south of Macao beach; and the new Shell gas station close to the airport (on the highway Coral) opened at the end of 2010.

Punta Cana Village, with a population of about 3,000, is being developed by a master plan of the Punta Cana Group. In 1969 the area was purchased by this organization and development began in the following decades. The main avenue, Boulevard Primero de Noviembre, is lined with low office buildings. Branching off are streets with gated communities on both sides. To the east are single family residences. Small apartment buildings are to the west. A shopping area is near the airport and beyond the apartment houses is a mall and several stores. East of the village is the Westin Resort and golf course by the ocean. There is a public beach, Playa Blanca, with a shuttle bus from the Village's sole hotel. An upscale planned community, Cap Cana, is south of Punta Cana Village.

=== Climate ===
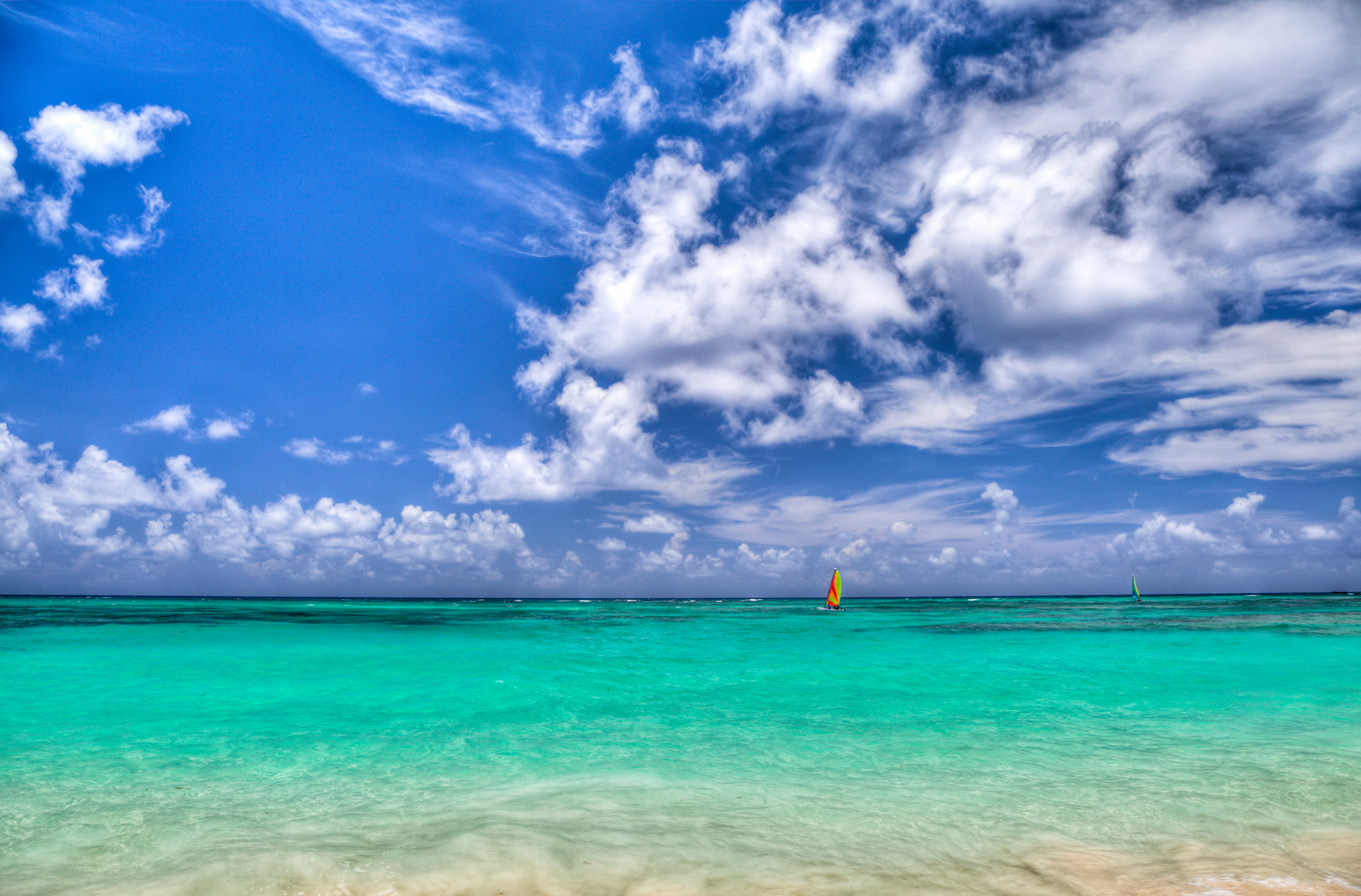
Beach in Punta Cana

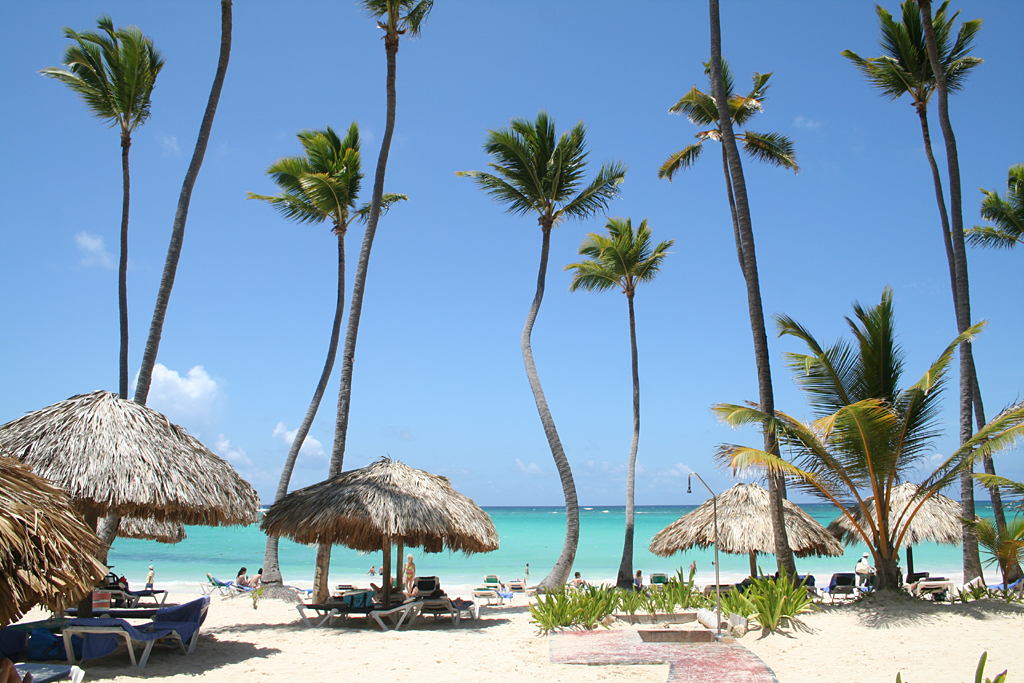
Beach in Punta Cana

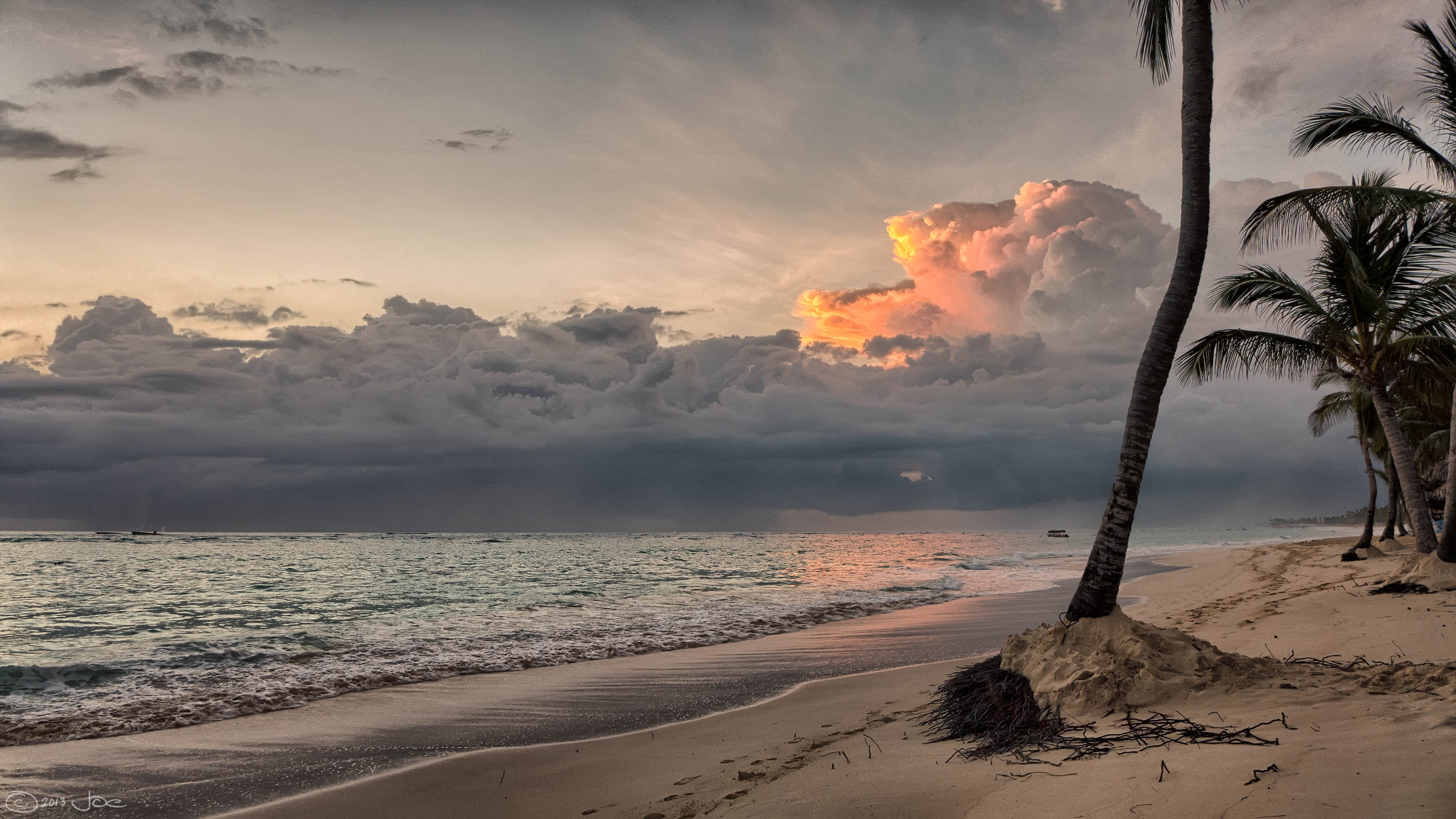
Sunrise over Punta Cana

Punta Cana features a tropical wet and dry climate under the Köppen climate classification. The weather is fairly consistent all year, with an average temperature of 26 °C (79 °F). The hot and humid season lasts from May to October, and during the day temperatures might reach 35 °C (95 °F). From November to March, temperatures during the evening are around 20 °C (68 °F).

Climate data for Punta Cana International Airport (1991–2020)
Month	Jan	Feb	Mar	Apr	May	Jun	Jul	Aug	Sep	Oct	Nov	Dec	Year
Mean daily maximum °C (°F)	28.5 (83.3)	29.0 (84.2)	29.0 (84.2)	29.8 (85.6)	30.3 (86.5)	31.2 (88.2)	31.8 (89.2)	32.0 (89.6)	31.9 (89.4)	31.5 (88.7)	30.3 (86.5)	29.4 (84.9)	30.4 (86.7)
Daily mean °C (°F)	24.8 (76.6)	25.1 (77.2)	25.4 (77.7)	26.2 (79.2)	26.9 (80.4)	27.7 (81.9)	28.0 (82.4)	28.2 (82.8)	28.0 (82.4)	27.6 (81.7)	26.6 (79.9)	25.6 (78.1)	26.7 (80.1)
Mean daily minimum °C (°F)	21.2 (70.2)	21.2 (70.2)	21.7 (71.1)	22.5 (72.5)	23.5 (74.3)	24.2 (75.6)	24.2 (75.6)	24.3 (75.7)	24.1 (75.4)	23.8 (74.8)	22.9 (73.2)	21.9 (71.4)	23.0 (73.4)
Average precipitation mm (inches)	84.7 (3.33)	62.8 (2.47)	50.4 (1.98)	64.9 (2.56)	129.3 (5.09)	93.7 (3.69)	84.7 (3.33)	106.7 (4.20)	135.3 (5.33)	123.6 (4.87)	131.1 (5.16)	91.3 (3.59)	1,158.6 (45.61)
Source: NOAA

Climate data for Punta Cana (1961–1990)
Month	Jan	Feb	Mar	Apr	May	Jun	Jul	Aug	Sep	Oct	Nov	Dec	Year
Record high °C (°F)	31.0 (87.8)	30.7 (87.3)	31.2 (88.2)	32.0 (89.6)	33.9 (93.0)	34.4 (93.9)	34.7 (94.5)	34.5 (94.1)	34.6 (94.3)	33.7 (92.7)	32.7 (90.9)	32.5 (90.5)	34.7 (94.5)
Mean daily maximum °C (°F)	27.7 (81.9)	27.6 (81.7)	28.1 (82.6)	28.7 (83.7)	29.6 (85.3)	30.3 (86.5)	30.5 (86.9)	30.7 (87.3)	30.9 (87.6)	30.5 (86.9)	29.4 (84.9)	28.1 (82.6)	29.3 (84.7)
Daily mean °C (°F)	24.8 (76.6)	24.7 (76.5)	25.0 (77.0)	25.5 (77.9)	26.4 (79.5)	27.2 (81.0)	27.5 (81.5)	27.7 (81.9)	27.6 (81.7)	27.0 (80.6)	26.3 (79.3)	25.2 (77.4)	26.2 (79.2)
Mean daily minimum °C (°F)	21.9 (71.4)	21.8 (71.2)	22.0 (71.6)	22.5 (72.5)	23.2 (73.8)	24.1 (75.4)	24.6 (76.3)	24.8 (76.6)	24.4 (75.9)	23.6 (74.5)	23.2 (73.8)	22.3 (72.1)	23.2 (73.8)
Record low °C (°F)	16.0 (60.8)	14.0 (57.2)	14.8 (58.6)	15.2 (59.4)	16.0 (60.8)	14.9 (58.8)	19.0 (66.2)	17.9 (64.2)	15.0 (59.0)	15.0 (59.0)	15.9 (60.6)	14.0 (57.2)	14.0 (57.2)
Average rainfall mm (inches)	66.4 (2.61)	54.2 (2.13)	54.2 (2.13)	69.2 (2.72)	124.4 (4.90)	103.9 (4.09)	78.3 (3.08)	103.1 (4.06)	101.7 (4.00)	152.1 (5.99)	116.6 (4.59)	78.5 (3.09)	1,102.6 (43.41)
Average rainy days (≥ 0.1 mm)	10.0	6.8	6.7	6.6	10.1	9.2	9.1	10.0	10.4	11.4	11.5	11.0	112.8
Average relative humidity (%)	82.8	81.4	81.2	82.1	83.0	82.2	82.3	82.6	82.5	83.0	82.2	83.2	82.4
Mean monthly sunshine hours	256.9	241.9	278.8	265.0	249.7	255.1	268.3	271.2	245.2	242.7	238.3	233.2	3,046.3
Source 1: World Meteorological Organization
Source 2: NOAA

== History and development ==
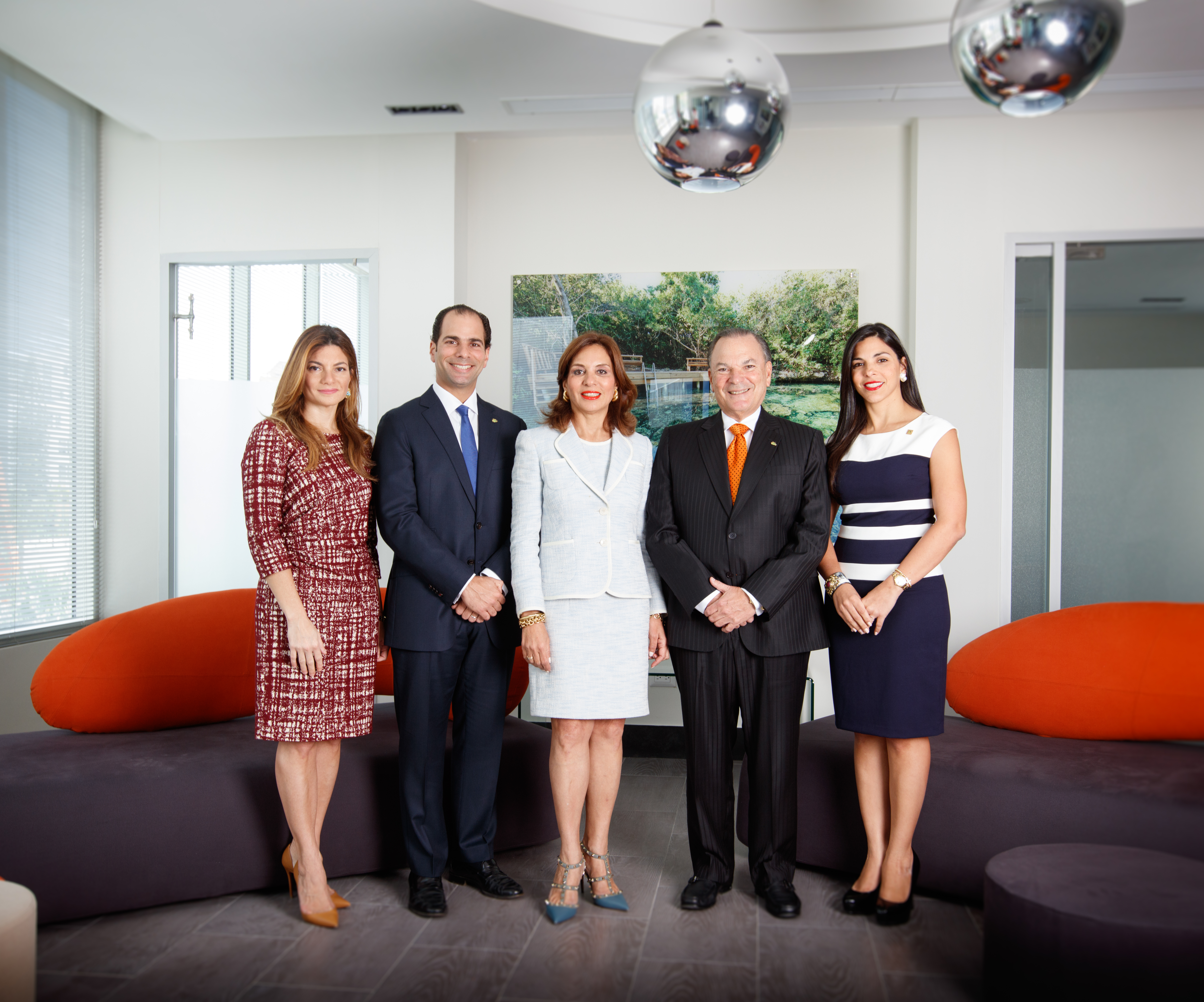
Frank Rainieri (red tie) with his family.

In the late 1960s, Frank Rainieri, a Dominican entrepreneur in his 20s and Theodore Kheel, a high-powered New York attorney and labor mediator, teamed up with other investors, to acquire a 58-million square meter lot on the eastern end of the Dominican Republic. The area that is known today as Punta Cana was mostly an undeveloped coastal area of La Altagracia province. At the time the closest major city, Higüey, was a 5-hour drive. Their first project was a 40 guest hotel called the Punta Cana Club. In 1970, Rainieri changed the original name of the place, Yauya or Punta Borrachos, to Punta Cana. In 1978, the Paris Mediterranean Club joined the Grupo Punta Cana SA project, building a 350-room hotel within the project. Later, the Barceló and Newco Group settled in the Bavaro area.

In 1979, the Hotel Puntacana was built and then in 1984, the Punta Cana International Airport was inaugurated, while more infrastructures such as highways were developed. In 1993, construction began on the Marina de Punta Cana Resort & Club marina. In 1996, the Dominican designer Óscar de la Renta and the Spanish singer Julio Iglesias joined the project. In 2000, the first of the residential community developments began and six years later Tortuga Bay opened.

Corporate environmental and social responsibilities and policies have been pursued since the resort was built. The Puntacana Foundation—made of the Ecological Foundation and Community Services—has a 1,500-acre reserve that now serves as a research base for universities and a sanctuary for endangered species and has opened two schools—the Ann & Ted Kheel Polytechnic and the Puntacana International School—and a free health clinic in the local community of Véron.

Punta Cana will host the 146th IOC Session in 2027.

=== Bavaro area ===
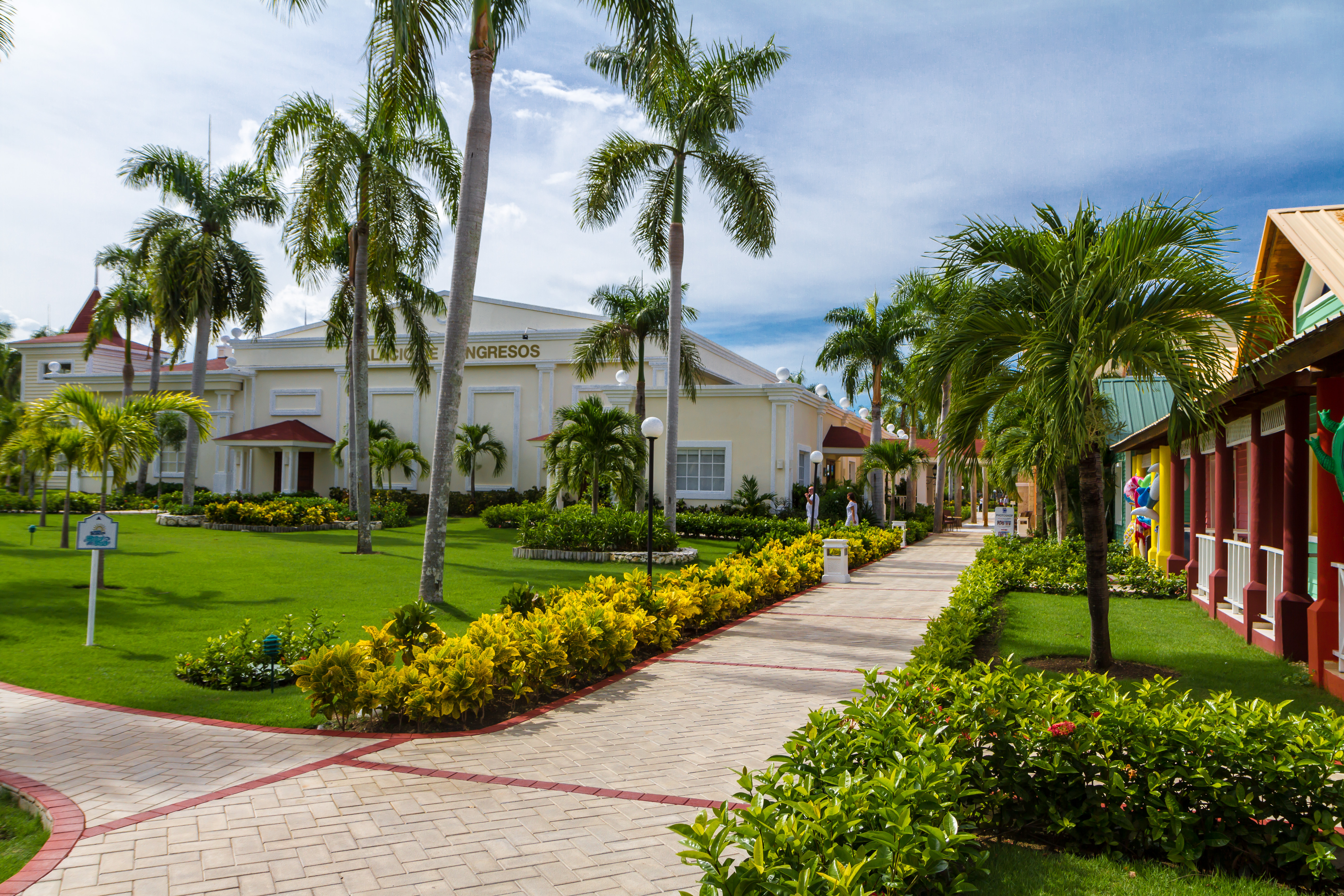
Resort entrance in Bavaro area

Bávaro was conceived as a town for the workers of the Punta Cana tourist complex, but it has been transformed into an important center for tourist services after the hotel expansion to the north of Punta Cana around Bávaro beach.

Numerous tourist attractions have been installed, some of a certain size such as the Manatí Park in Bávaro, a water park with manatees, dolphins and other kinds of animals. For tourists, the Punta Cana beach area is more popular because it is more affordable at international prices. Among the best-known digital magazines and newspapers in the entire eastern area are: BavaroDigital and BavaroMagazine.

Bavaro is connected by road with Higüey and La Otra Banda. It extends about 15 kilometres (9.3 mi) north to Playa Macao. Other nearby beaches are: Uvero Alto, Roco Ki and La Vacama. Bavaro has 10 kilometres (6.2 mi) of beaches. The XII Ibero-American Summit was held on this site on November 15 and 16, 2002, where the heads of state and government of 21 Spanish and Portuguese-speaking nations met.

== Population ==
The area has a low population density with the majority of the inhabitants being Haitian migrant workers. In 2010, Haitians represented 81.1 percent of the total population.

== Tourism ==
Punta Cana is a tourist destination, and the area is a key contributor to tourism in the Dominican Republic. The Punta Cana and Bávaro region features a nightlife scene that has established itself as a world-class tourist attraction. Over the last few decades, the destination has diversified its entertainment beyond traditional hotel resorts by incorporating large-scale leisure complexes. International venues such as Coco Bongo have introduced a format that blends the traditional nightclub experience with immersive theatrical productions. These venues operate with technical production levels akin to Las Vegas shows, incorporating aerial acrobatics, choreography, pop culture tributes, and advanced audiovisual technology. This evolution in nightlife has been instrumental in complementing the country's sun and sand tourism model.

== Infrastructure ==
=== Transportation ===
The Punta Cana International Airport is the primary airport. In 2014, Punta Cana received over 2.4 million passengers, making it the second-busiest airport in the Caribbean. Grupo Puntacana built the Punta Cana International Airport in 1984 to facilitate tourism in the area. It was the western hemisphere's first privately owned international airport.

=== Electricity ===
The electricity is powered by Consorcio Energetico Punta Cana Macao (CEPM), a fossil fuel, renewable, and biomass energy producer led by US-based Argentine businessman Rolando Gonzalez-Bunster.

=== Activities and landmarks ===
Many of the excursions in Punta Cana are near the water, it being a beach destination. These activities include snorkeling, windsurfing, banana boat rides, speedboats, scuba diving, catamaran cruises, party boats, deep sea fishing, as well as swimming with dolphins and sharks and snorkeling with stingrays. For visitors who prefer to see more of the Dominican countryside, there are land-based excursions such as safari tours, horseback riding and dune buggies.

Visiting the Dominican Republic's smaller Caribbean islands of Saona and Catalina is a day trip from Punta Cana. The capital city Santo Domingo, and Los Haitises National Park, Samaná, are within a couple of hours. The Basilica Catholic Monument, built in 1962 and designed by two French architects, is in nearby Higüey, the 500-year-old capital of the province.

=== Diving ===
Because of its location at the Caribbean Sea, diving is one of the tourist activities. The marine area surrounding Punta Cana was declared a marine reserve in 2012.

Off Punta Cana and Bávaro lies a coral barrier extending for nearly 30 kilometres. The reef is one of the principal settings for snorkeling and recreational diving in the area and can also be viewed from glass-bottom boats.

=== Safety ===
Punta Cana received negative publicity in the summer of 2019 for a series of American tourist deaths. Initially these deaths were reported as “mysterious,” with tainted alcohol and pesticides being rumored as possible reasons. However, with the help of the FBI and United States Department of State, it was found via toxicology reports that the deaths were from natural causes.

Punta Cana is generally a very safe travel destination.

== Marine biodiversity ==
The following species have been registered in the waters around Punta Cana:

Group	Common name	Scientific name	Image	Notes
Fish	yellowtail snapper	Ocyurus chrysurus		
Fish	queen triggerfish	Balistes vetula		
Fish	glasseye	Heteropriacanthus cruentatis		
Fish	whitespotted filefish	Cantherhines macrocerus		
Fish	spotted goatfish	Pseudupeneus maculatus		
Fish	yellow goatfish	Mulloidichthys martinicus		
Fish	Bermuda chub	Kyphosus sectatrix		
Fish	great barracuda	Sphyraena barracuda		
Fish	bar jack	Caranx ruber		
Fish	saucereye porgy	Calamus calamus		
Fish	French angelfish	Pomacanthus paru		
Fish	southern stingray	Dasyatis americana		
Fish	yellow stingray	Urolobatis jamaicensis		
Fish	spotted eagle ray	Aetobatus narinari		
Fish	Caribbean reef shark	Carcharhinus perezi		
Fish	goldentail moray	Gymnothorax miliaris		
Fish	spotted moray	Gymnothorax moringa		
Fish	mangrove snapper	Lutjanus griseus		
Fish	mutton snapper	Lutjanus analis		
Fish	porkfish	Anisotremus virginicus		
Fish	black margate	Anisotremus surinamensis		
Fish	blue striped grunt	Haemulon sciurus		
Fish	Caesar grunt	Haemulon carbonarium		
Fish	French grunt	Haemulon flavolineatum		
Fish	Spanish grunt	Haemulon macrostomum		
Fish	tomtate grunt	Haemulon aurolineatum		
Fish	white grunt	Haemulon plumierii		
Fish	black grouper	Mycteroperca bonaci		
Fish	coney	Cephalopholis fulva		
Fish	Nassau grouper	Epinephelus striatus		
Fish	sergeant major	Abudefduf saxatilis		
Fish	lucky grouper	Epinephelus guttatus		
Fish	yellowfin grouper	Mycteroperca venenosa		
Fish	graysby	Cephalopholis cruentata		
Fish	harlequin bass	Serranus tigrinus		
Fish	princess parrotfish	Scarus taeniopterus		
Fish	queen parrotfish	Scarus vetula		
Fish	rainbow parrotfish	Scarus guacamaia		
Fish	redband parrotfish	Sparisoma aurofrenatum		
Fish	redfin parrotfish	Sparisoma rubripinne		
Fish	redtail parrotfish	Sparisoma chrysopterum		
Fish	stoplight parrotfish	Sparisoma viride		
Fish	Spanish hogfish	Bodianus rufus		
Fish	hogfish	Lachnolaimus maximus		
Fish	bonefish	Albula vulpes		
Fish	long-spine porcupinefish	Diodon holocanthus		
Fish	red lionfish (invasive)	Pterois volitans		
Fish	yellowtail damselfish	Microspathodon chrysurus		
Fish	yellowhead wrasse	Halichoeres garnoti		
Reptiles	green sea turtle	Chelonia mydas		
Reptiles	hawksbill sea turtle	Eretmochelys imbricata		
Mollusks	Caribbean reef squid	Sepioteuthis sepiodea		
Mollusks	common octopus	Octopus vulgaris		
Mollusks	queen conch	Lobatus gigas		
Crustaceans	banded coral shrimp	Stenopus hispidus		
Crustaceans	Caribbean spiny lobster	Panulirus argus		
Crustaceans	spotted spiny lobster	Panulirus guttatus		
Crustaceans		Scyllarides aequinoctialis		
Corals	purple sea fan	Gorgonia ventalina		
Corals	sea ginger	Millepora alcicornis		
Corals	blade fire coral	Millepora complanata		
Corals		Millepora squarrosa		
Corals		Stephanoccenia intercepta		
Corals	elkhorn coral	Acropora palmata		
Corals	staghorn coral	Acropora cervicornis		
Corals	fused staghorn coral	Acropora prolifera		
Corals		Agaricia agarities		
Corals	finger coral	Porites porites		
Corals		Montastrea annuligera		
Corals		Montastrea colemani		
Corals		Montastrea curta		
Corals		Montastrea magnistellata		
Corals		Montastrea multipunctata		
Corals		Montastrea salebrosa		
Corals		Montastrea serageldini		
Corals	pillar coral	Dendrogyra cylindrus		
Algae		Halimeda opuntia		
Algae	cactus tree alga	Caulerpa cupressoides		
Algae		Coelothrix irregularis		
Algae		Haploplegma duperryi		
Algae		Rhodophyta orden		
Algae		Dictyota cervicornis		
Algae		Stypopodium zonale		
Sea grasses	turtlegrass	Thalassia testudinum		
Sea grasses	manatee grass	Syringodium filiforme		
Echinoderms	donkey dung sea cucumber	Holothuria mexicana		
Echinoderms	black sea urchin	Diadema antillarum		
Mammals	West Indian manatee	Trichechus manatus		
Birds	brown pelican	Pelecanus occidentalis		
Birds	common tern	Sterna hirundo		
Birds	great egret	Ardea alba		
Birds	green heron	Butorides virescens		
Birds	yellow-crowned night heron	Nyctanassa violacea		
Birds	killdeer	Charadrius vociferus		
Birds	western osprey	Pandion haliaetus		
Birds	magnificent frigatebird	Fregata magnificens		

== List of authorities ==
- Saturnina Vásquez, most known as "María Verón", from the Dominican Liberation Party. Chosen directrix in 2007. Her vice director was Omar Elías Vásquez. She later served as vice directrix from 2016 to 2020.
- Radhamés Carpio, from the Social Christian Reformist Party. Elected director in 2010. His vice directrix was Ángela Rivera.
- Ramón Antonio "Manolito" Ramírez, from the Dominican Liberation Party. Elected director in 2016, re-elected in 2020 and 2024. In his three terms, he has had three vice directrixes: María Verón, Ángela Rivera, and Carmen Valdez; one for each term.

== See also ==
- Puntacana Resort and Club
