= Channel V at the Hard Rock Live =

Channel V at the Hard Rock Live may refer to:

- Channel V at the Hard Rock Live (Mr. Big album), 1996
- Channel V at the Hard Rock Live (Richard Marx album), 1995
