= Hard Rock Cafe (disambiguation) =

Hard Rock Cafe is an international chain of restaurants.

Hard Rock Cafe may also refer to:

- "Hard Rock Cafe", a side one of The Doors' 1970 album, Morrison Hotel
- "Hard Rock Cafe", a song recorded by Carole King in 1977, reaching number 30 on the US Hot 100
