= Hard Rock Hotel New York =

Hotel in Manhattan, New York

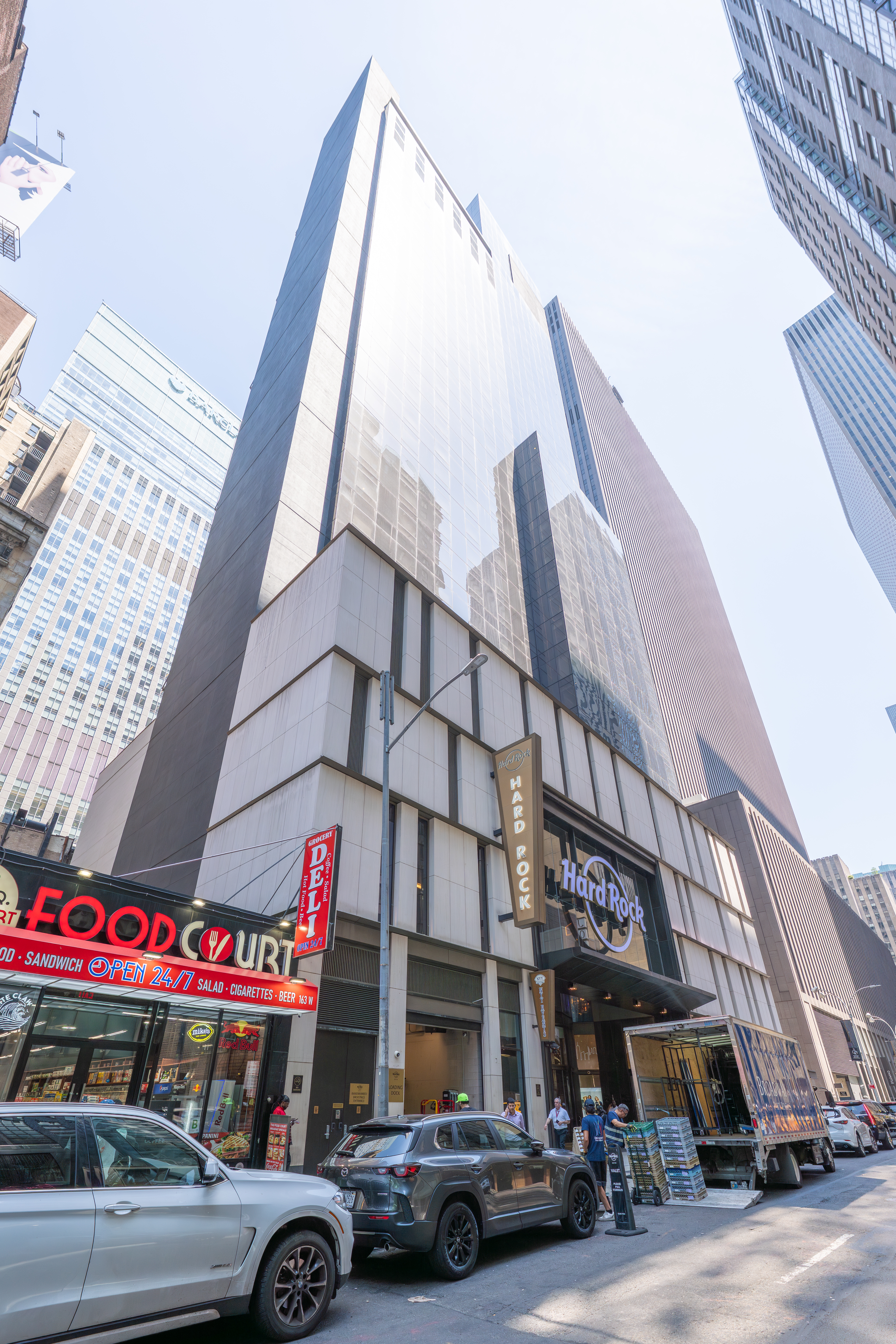
- Hard Rock Hotel New York
- Interactive map of the Hard Rock Hotel New York area

General information
- Status: Completed
- Type: Hotel
- Architectural style: Modern
- Coordinates: 40°45′35″N 73°59′0″W
- Construction started: 2019
- Completed: 2022
- Opening: April 22, 2022

Technical details
- Floor count: 36
- Floor area: 291,000 ft^{2} (27,000 m^{2})

Design and construction
- Architect: SLCE Architects
- Developer: Extell Development Company
- Structural engineer: DeSimone Consulting Engineers
- Main contractor: Tishman Construction

Other information
- Number of rooms: 446

Hard Rock Hotel New York is a hotel located in Midtown Manhattan, New York City, at 159 West 48th Street just north of Times Square. It opened on April 25, 2022, featuring performances from John Legend, DJ Cassidy, Chantel Jeffries, DJ Coleman, Kenan Thompson, Zack Bia, Nas, Busta Rhymes, and Fat Joe. The property includes 86,000 artifacts from artists like John Lennon, Joey Ramone, and Lady Gaga, an event venue called "The Venue on Music Row", a restaurant called "Sessions Restaurant and Bar", RT60 rooftop bar and lounge, a café called "Rock Shop Coffee Shop", a Yankees-themed steakhouse called NYY Steak and a venue/recording studio called Audacy Live. Crosley record players and Fender guitars can be delivered to guests' rooms upon request. Hard Rock Hotel's NYY Steak is the third location, with others being in Florida and Yankee Stadium. There are 446 guest rooms and suites across 36 floors. On the top floor is the 3,300-square-foot (310 m^{2}) Rockstar Suite penthouse. It has multiple floors, access to RT60 Rooftop Bar and Lounge, and a 1,600-square-foot (150 m^{2}) terrace.
