= Hard Rock Las Vegas =

Upcoming casino hotel resort on the Strip

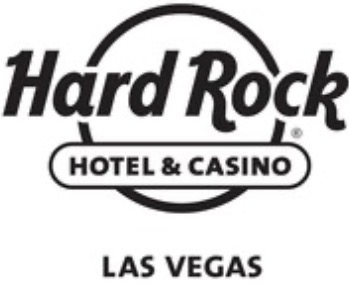

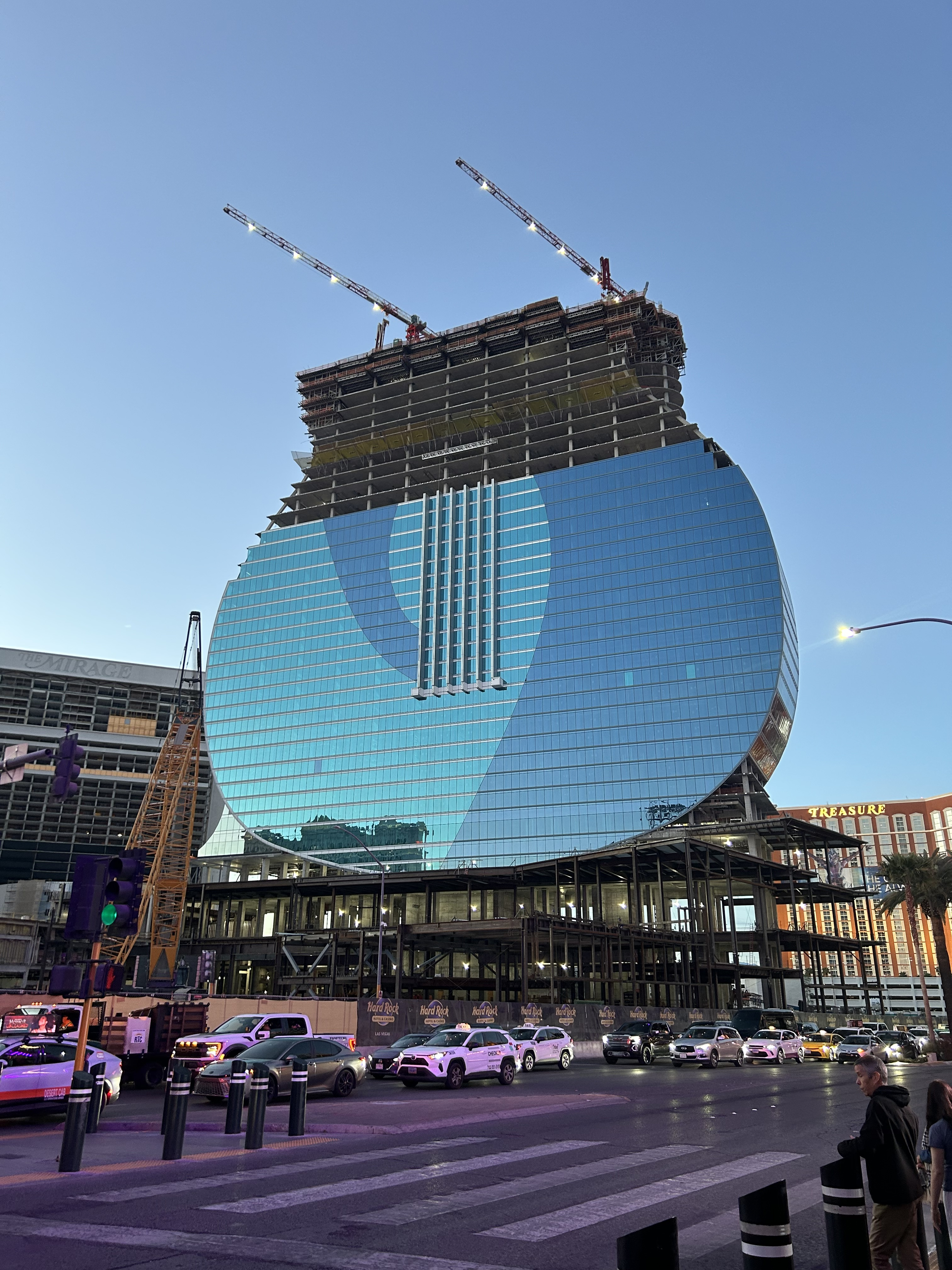
- Under construction (March 2026)

- Location within Las Vegas Strip Location within Nevada
- Interactive map of Hard Rock Las Vegas
- Location: Paradise, Nevada, U.S.; 3400 South Las Vegas Boulevard; 36°07′16″N 115°10′31″W
- Opened: Q4 2027 (expected)
- Theme: Rock and roll
- No. of rooms: approx. 3,700
- Gaming space: 174,000 sq ft (16,200 m^{2})
- Signature attractions: Hard Rock Live; West Theater (proposed)
- Casino type: Land-based
- Owner: Vici Properties
- Operating license holder: Hard Rock International (Seminole Tribe of Florida)
- Architect: Klai Juba Wald Architecture + Interiors
- Previous names: The Mirage (1989–2024)
- Website: www.hardrockvegas.com
- Building details

Design and construction
- Main contractor: The PENTA Building Group

Hard Rock Las Vegas is a casino hotel resort under construction at the center of the Las Vegas Strip in Paradise, Nevada. It is owned by Vici Properties and leased by Hard Rock International. A previous casino resort, The Mirage, opened on the site in 1989 and will be incorporated into the new project.

It is the second Hard Rock gaming property in the Las Vegas Valley; the earlier Hard Rock Hotel & Casino operated from 1995 to 2020. Plans for the new Hard Rock were announced in December 2021, and Hard Rock took over operations of the Mirage one year later, before closing it on July 17, 2024. The Mirage will receive a property wide renovation as part of the Hard Rock rebrand, which will include the addition of a guitar-shaped hotel tower, similar to the Seminole Hard Rock Hotel & Casino Hollywood in South Florida. Hard Rock Las Vegas is scheduled to open in the fourth quarter of 2027. It will feature a 174,000 sq ft (16,200 m^{2}) casino and approximately 3,700 rooms, including 675 in the guitar tower.

== History ==
=== Background ===
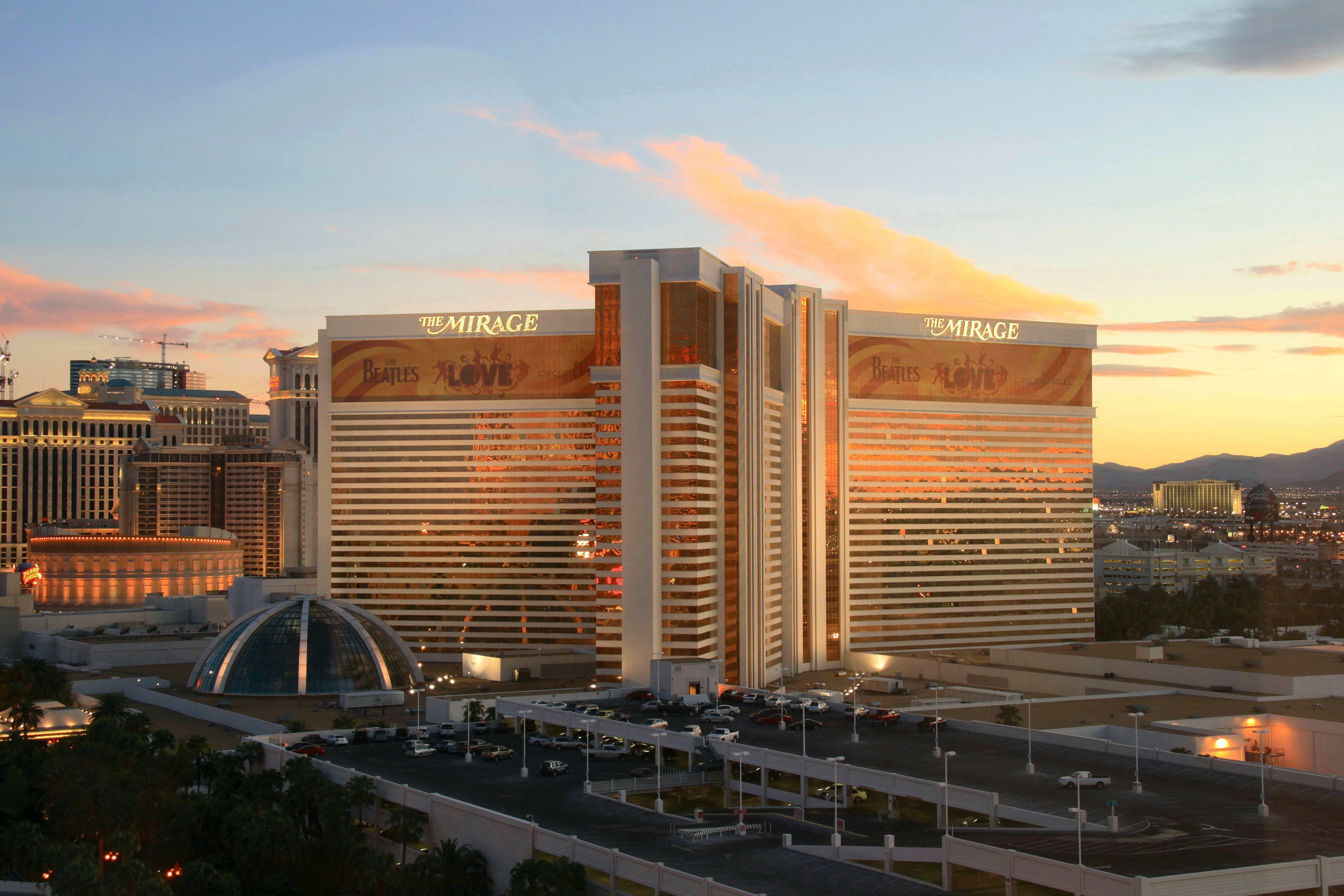
Hard Rock Las Vegas will incorporate the resort tower from the Mirage Hotel & Casino, opened in November 1989 and seen here in August 2008 at sunset.

An earlier gaming property, the Hard Rock Hotel & Casino, operated east of the Las Vegas Strip from 1995 to 2020. Unlike other locations, Hard Rock International was not involved with the property except for licensing and branding, including the name, as Hard Rock Cafe co-founder Peter Morton and subsequent owners kept the property and the naming rights to develop their own Hard Rock Hotels & Casinos in western territories. In 2019, with plans to rename the original Hard Rock as Virgin Hotels Las Vegas, Hard Rock International expressed an interest in buying a property on the Strip and rebranding it as a new Hard Rock resort. In May 2020, the company bought the naming rights for a future Las Vegas property and the development rights from Juniper Capital.

The upcoming Hard Rock Las Vegas is being developed at the former site of the Mirage, a casino resort on the central Strip. The Mirage opened on November 22, 1989, and later came under the ownership of MGM Resorts International. Hard Rock announced in December 2021 that it would rebrand the Mirage as Hard Rock Las Vegas. Vici Properties completed a previously announced a $17 billion acquisition of MGM's properties, including the Mirage, in April 2022. MGM continued to operate these properties, although Hard Rock took over the Mirage's operations in December 2022, after completing a $1.075 billion deal with MGM. Hard Rock leases the property from Vici, and continued operating the Mirage until its closure on July 17, 2024.

=== 2024–present: Planning and construction ===
Work on the Hard Rock project began one day after the closure. The Mirage structures would receive a full renovation as part of the Hard Rock rebranding, with hotel rooms being completely remodeled. The casino and convention facilities will also be expanded.

Aside from renovations to existing rooms, Hard Rock also intends to construct a guitar-shaped hotel tower on the property, akin to the Seminole Hard Rock Hotel & Casino Hollywood in Broward County, Florida. The new tower is being built on the former site of the Mirage's volcano attraction. Demolition of the volcano was among the first tasks on the Hard Rock project, and local architect Klai Juba Wald Architecture + Interiors, which also designed the Hollywood resort, was hired to design the property.

The guitar tower is expected to rise 660 feet (200 m). Hard Rock previously proposed a larger 998-foot (304 m) tower, which was rejected by Clark County officials. Construction of the tower is expected to take two and a half years; most of the pilings were in place as of January 2025. The size of the Hard Rock project soon grew to include additional rooms in the guitar tower, increasing it from 596 to 675. The updated plans also include expanded pool and spa amenities. The final structural beam was installed at the top of the newly-built 42-story guitar-shaped hotel tower on May 1, 2026.

The $4 billion Hard Rock Las Vegas is expected to open in the fourth quarter of 2027, several months later than previously scheduled. The property is expected to employ up to 6,000 workers, and will open with a 174,000 square feet (16,200 m^{2}) casino, featuring 2,000 slot machines and 212 table games. The hotel will have approximately 3,700 rooms, including those in the new guitar tower. Like the original off-Strip property that operated from 1995 to 2020, the new resort is expected to feature music memorabilia, though not to the same extent.

The general contractor is PENTA. Upon the opening of the hotel, the Hard Rock-Treasure Island Tram, previously known as the Mirage-Treasure Island Tram, will reopen. The tram previously connected the Mirage and Treasure Island Hotel and Casino. On July 17, 2026, as construction was underway, Hard Rock proposed a 2,000-seat, five-story live theater with a karaoke room in the second floor behind the Guitar Hotel known as West Theater, alongside a guitar museum and a sportsbook facing the Strip with 88,650 square feet (8,236 m^{2}). The resort is also planned to have a 5,000-seat Hard Rock Live arena.

As of August 2026, construction has accelerated.

== See also ==
- List of integrated resorts
- List of largest hotels
