= All-inclusive resort =

Type of resort

An all-inclusive resort is a holiday resort that generally includes, in the price of booking a stay, lodging, unlimited food and drinks, entertainment, and other recreational activities. They are often located in warmer regions of the world, particularly in the Mediterranean, Mexico and the Caribbean.

Though some Butlin's holiday camps in the U.K. had offered a similar concept in the 1930s, the modern all-inclusive resort has its origins in the 1950s with the foundation of the Club Med company by Belgian entrepreneur Gérard Blitz. Their first resort was opened in Alcúdia, Majorca, Spain in 1950, where guests stayed in tents and basic straw huts along the beach.

The concept has evolved over the decades. All-inclusives in the 1980s and 1990s were generally marketed towards singles, later on becoming more popular with couples and families.

Those geared toward families may have facilities like craft centers, game rooms, and water parks to keep children of all ages entertained. All-inclusive resorts geared towards couples are also popular locations for weddings and honeymoons.

== Resorts by type ==
=== All-inclusive resort ===
An all-inclusive resort, in addition to all the amenities of a resort, charges a fixed price that includes most or all items offered. At a minimum, most inclusive resorts include lodging, drinks (both alcoholic and non-alcoholic), food (three meals: breakfast, lunch, and dinner), indoor and outdoor activities, and entertainment for a fixed price.

=== Destination resorts ===
They generally are called "all-inclusive destination resorts". These facilities provide food, drink, lodging, sports, fitness programs and spas, entertainment, and shopping, with the advantage that guests do not have to leave the resort after arriving.

=== Adults-only all-inclusive resorts ===
In most cases, "Adults Only" means that resorts in this category do not admit children. The minimum age of admission varies from resort to resort but is usually 18 years of age or older.

== Criticisms ==
It has been noted that, depending on the fine print, and the traveller's individual interests - especially with respect to out-of-resort-trips - that an "all-inclusive" offer may eventually turn out more costly than a regular offer.

Also, ambiguity about what "all-inclusive" means sometimes leads to travelers being disappointed that services which they expected are not available or require payment of additional fees. For example, guests are often disappointed to learn that only "cheap" (i. e., "well" or "bottom shelf") liquor is included, and that they must pay an upcharge for "top-shelf" alcohol.

== See also ==
- Health club
- Hotel
- Spa
- Vacation
