= Hard Rock Hotel & Casino Sacramento at Fire Mountain =

Integrated resort and cafe in Yuba County, California, U.S.

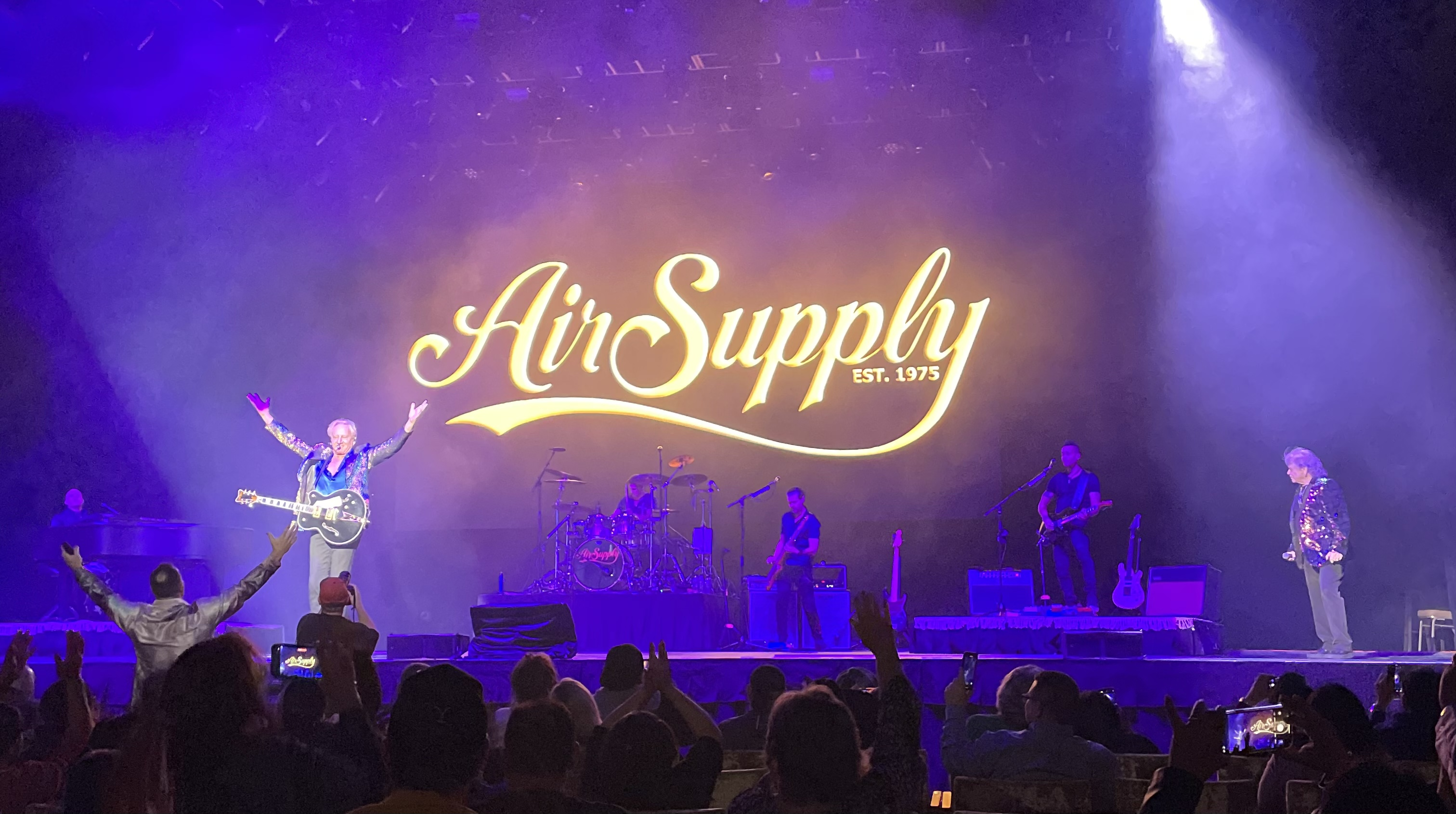
- Air Supply on stage performing at the resort's Hard Rock Live (January 20, 2023)
- Interactive map of Hard Rock Hotel & Casino Sacramento at Fire Mountain
- Location: Wheatland, California, U.S.; Original location: Westfield Downtown Plaza 545 Downtown Plz Sacramento, CA 95814; New address since 2019: 3317 Forty Mile Road, 95692; 39°03′11″N 121°30′44″W
- Opened: August 22, 1997; 29 years ago (original location); October 30, 2019; 7 years ago
- Closed: March 27, 2010; 16 years ago (original location)
- Theme: Rock and roll
- No. of rooms: 169
- Gaming space: 60,000 square feet (5,600 m^{2})
- Signature attractions: Hard Rock Live
- Notable restaurants: Hard Rock Cafe; Council Oak Steaks & Seafood; Fresh Harvest; YouYu Noodle Bar; 24/7 Constant Grind
- Casino type: Land-based
- Owner: Enterprise Rancheria of Maidu Indians of California
- Operating license holder: Hard Rock International
- Architect: Friedmutter Group
- Previous names: Hard Rock Cafe Sacramento (1997–2010, original location); Fire Mountain Casino (planning, 2016–2018)
- Website: casino.hardrock.com/sacramento
- Building details
- Exterior view of the original Hard Rock Cafe at night (September 2008)

Design and construction
- Main contractor: Moorefield Construction; Yates Construction

Other information
- Parking: Free self-parking

Hard Rock Hotel & Casino Sacramento at Fire Mountain is an integrated resort in Wheatland, California, United States, situated north of Sacramento near the Toyota Amphitheatre in Yuba County. It is owned by the Enterprise Rancheria, while it is managed by Hard Rock International and opened in October 2019.

Initially, a standalone Hard Rock Cafe debuted in 1997 and closed in 2010, while the casino's planning dates back to 2002. It was delayed due to several lawsuits and complaints from competing tribes, though it finally began construction in spring 2016 as the Fire Mountain Casino. After construction was halted in the summer of that year as problems continued, the tribe partnered with the Seminole Tribe of Florida in the summer of 2018 to finish the project under its current name.

== History ==
=== 1997–2010: Original location ===
The restaurant at daytime (August 2008)

The original Hard Rock Cafe opened in 1997, in Downtown Plaza (K Street Mall) at 545 Downtown Plaza in Sacramento, California. It closed permanently on March 27, 2010 after its lease expired. Hard Rock International chose not to renew the lease, framing it as a "strategic business decision", as Westfield Downtown Plaza's vacancies were growing.

=== 2002–2016: Initial plans, controversy, and construction ===
On June 26, 2002, the Estom Yumeka Maidu Tribe of the Enterprise Rancheria submitted a federal request to acquire 40 acres (16 ha) of land in trust near Wheatland—35 miles north of Sacramento–to build an off-reservation casino hotel. The original proposal for the integrated resort was a $140 million to $170 million project, featuring an eight-story hotel tower with 170 rooms, a buffet, two restaurants, a pool, a spa, retail space, and arcade. The casino floor would span 318,000 square feet (29,500 m^{2}), with 1,700 to 2,500 slot machines and table games.

The proposal faced criticism from competing tribes, particularly the United Auburn Indian Community, which owns the Thunder Valley Casino Resort, the Cachil Dehe Band of Wintun Indians of the Colusa Indian Community, which owns the Colusa Casino, and Yocha Dehe Wintun Nation, which owns the Cache Creek Casino Resort. They filed a lawsuit for "reservation shopping," attempting to legally invalidate the Bureau of Indian Affairs' (BIA) authority to take the Yuba County site into trust for the Enterprise Rancheria on September 3, 2011. The U.S. Supreme Court decision in Carcieri v. Salazar was used to back up their arguments, which stated that the federal government can only take land into federal trust for tribes that were "under federal jurisdiction" when the Indian Reorganization Act of 1934 was created. The rival tribes accused Enterprise Rancheria of not meeting this criterion, but judges rejected this argument, citing that the BIA had organized an official election for the Enterprise tribe in 1935. This confirmation status led to the Enterprise Rancheria to win the lawsuit on September 28, 2015.

On September 6, 2014, the rival tribes successfully convinced the California Legislature to stall and refuse ratification of the Class III gaming compact signed by California Governor Jerry Brown for "failing to negotiate in good faith." By September 29, 2015, the casino plans were altered to feature Class II games and a downsized format of 105,750 square feet (9,824 m^{2}). The tribe did not chose their own reservation land in Butte County, California because its casino market was saturated. However, the competing tribes targeted the BIA's environmental review process under the National Environmental Policy Act (NEPA) on October 23, 2015, arguing that the DOI completely ignored alternate sites regarding economic harm that the Enterprise Rancheria already owned a "larger, suitable" parcel of land within Butte County. Judges, however, repeatedly ruled that federal law does not legally ban tribal casinos from market competition.

Construction on the project finally began on April 8, 2016, planned to be called the Fire Mountain Casino. By then, it would cost $170 million. $697,120 and another $697,120 was shared to Yuba County and the City of Marysville. However, an appeal from the United Auburn Indian Community successfully forced all construction on the project to be suspended, which happened in late July of that year.

=== 2018–2019: Hard Rock partnership and opening ===
On July 16, 2018, the Enterprise Rancheria announced a joint venture with Hard Rock International, owned by the Seminole Tribe of Florida. As a result, the original 2016 plans were canceled in favor of a $440 million mega-resort. The new proposal included scaling up to 1,800 slots and tables, 170 rooms and suites, and a collection of restaurants and bars. The "Fire Mountain Casino" name was also scrapped as part of the collaboration, and the project would be rebranded as the Hard Rock Hotel and Casino Sacramento at Fire Mountain. Construction officially resumed in late 2018 after the legal battle finally ended.

A topping-off ceremony was held on February 14, 2019. Hard Rock Hotel & Casino Sacramento at Fire Mountain had its grand opening celebration on October 30 of that year, with the Hard Rock Guitar Smash, and the donation of $100,000 to the Enterprise Community Foundation. (Note: This is the charitable and philanthropic arm of the Enterprise Rancheria; it is not to be confused with Enterprise Community Partners.) The $450 million resort was built on 900 acres (360 ha) of land. The hotel had 169 rooms, while 1,587 slot machines and 57 table games were on the Vegas-style casino floor, alongside a gambling room exclusive to travelers coming from the San Francisco Bay Area. As the property at the time did not feature a concert venue yet, Hard Rock partnered with Live Nation in July of that year to host an official, commemorative concert at the neighboring Toyota Amphitheatre, which took place on November 2, featuring Def Leppard, Last in Line, and Don Felder.

=== 2020–present ===
Hard Rock Hotel & Casino Sacramento would close temporarily on March 19, 2020 due to the COVID-19 pandemic, reopening two months later under the Hard Rock's "Safe + Sound" social distancing guidelines.

== Features ==
=== Resort amenities ===
The hotel was planned to have the Body Rock Fitness Center and Rock Shop when it topped out in mid-February 2019.

=== Restaurants, shopping and entertainment ===
When the resort opened in late October 2019, it featured a flagship Hard Rock Cafe, Council Oaks Steaks & Seafood, an Asian restaurant known as Song, YouYu Noodle Bar, and 24/7 Constant Grind. The 2,500-seat Hard Rock Live venue would have its debut at the resort on June 3, 2022, with a concert from Maroon 5, and also with involvement from Live Nation Entertainment. The architect for the theater was Scéno Plus.

In mid-April 2025, the Enterprise Rancheria purchased 350 acres (140 ha) of land, and announced an aggressive, $2 billion to $4 billion mega-expansion, planning to add an open-air retail and dining promenade, an indoor-outdoor water park, youth sports training facilities, an agricultural rodeo events center, and potentially even a stadium, expected to start construction from 2026 to 2027, with an expected completion date of five to ten years.

== See also ==
- Hard Rock Hotel and Casino (Las Vegas)
- Hard Rock Hotel & Casino Tulsa
