= Margaritaville Casino =

Margaritaville Casino or Margaritaville Resort may refer to any of several properties using Jimmy Buffett's Margaritaville brand:

- Margaritaville Atlantic City, a section of the Resorts Casino Hotel
- Margaritaville Casino, formerly a section of the Flamingo Las Vegas
- Margaritaville Casino and Restaurant in Biloxi, Mississippi (now closed)
- Margaritaville Casino and Restaurant (Tulsa) at the River Spirit Casino Resort in Oklahoma
- Margaritaville Resort Biloxi
- Margaritaville Resort Casino in Bossier City, Louisiana
- Margaritaville Resort Orlando
- Margaritaville Resort Palm Springs
- Trump Marina in Atlantic City, which would have been renamed as Margaritaville under an aborted 2008 agreement
