= Margaritaville (disambiguation) =

"Margaritaville" is a song by Jimmy Buffett.

Margaritaville may also refer to:

- Escape to Margaritaville, a Broadway musical
- Jimmy Buffett's Margaritaville, a United States–based hospitality company based on the song
- Radio Margaritaville, an internet radio station
- Meet Me in Margaritaville: The Ultimate Collection, a greatest hits album by Jimmy Buffett released in 2003
- Margaritaville Records, Jimmy Buffett's vanity label; see Margaritaville Cafe: Late Night
- "Margaritaville" (South Park), a 2009 episode of South Park
- Margaritaville at Sea, a cruise line
- Margaritaville at Sea Paradise, a cruise ship

== See also ==
- Margaritaville Casino (disambiguation)
