= Margaritaville Lake Resort =

Resort near Osage Beach, Missouri

Coordinates: 38°07′41″N 92°43′02″W

Margaritaville Lake Resort Lake of the Ozarks, previously known as Tan-Tar-A Resort, is a resort located in Osage Township, Camden County, Missouri, just outside Osage Beach, Missouri, at the Lake of the Ozarks. The hotel was sold in 2017 for redevelopment as part of the Margaritaville resort chain. Adjoining the hotel property is a large development of private homes known as the Tan-Tar-A Estates.

== History ==
Tan-Tar-A was developed by St. Louis homebuilder Burton Duenke. It opened in 1960 as the first major resort on Lake of the Ozarks, and was expanded over the years. In 1977, Duenke sold the resort to Marriott, but retained his interest in the adjoining residential development, Tan-Tar-A Estates.

Marriott extensively refurbished the resort, which by 1985 had more than 800 rooms and a wide variety of amenities and activities.

In July 2017, the resort was sold to Driftwood Acquisitions and Development, a Miami-based management company, which began another large remodeling project, and announced that the resort would be rebranded in 2019 as part of the Margaritaville resort chain.

== Facilities ==
The Resort Complex consists of five interconnecting buildings and several outlying buildings. Most of the resort activities and amenities are located on the Resort Complex. The Estates Complex buildings are designed to look like houses on the outside, but are individual units on the inside. Amenities include The Oaks, an 18-hole golf course, Jolly Mon Indoor Water Park, Port of Indecision Marina, and a popular lakeside dining restaurant - Landshark Bar & Grill. The Resort is open to the public and allows outside traffic to utilize its Lakeside Pool where the popular Tiki Hut Bar is located.

The Tan-Tar-A Resort Seaplane Base (FAA LID: 19T) serves the resort. It is a privately owned, public-use seaplane base located six nautical miles (11 km) north of the central business district of Osage Beach. The base has one seaplane landing area designated NW/SE, measuring 13,000 x 1,200 feet (3,962 x 366 m).

== See also ==
- List of airports in Missouri
