= Classica-class cruise ship =

Class of cruise ship

Classica class
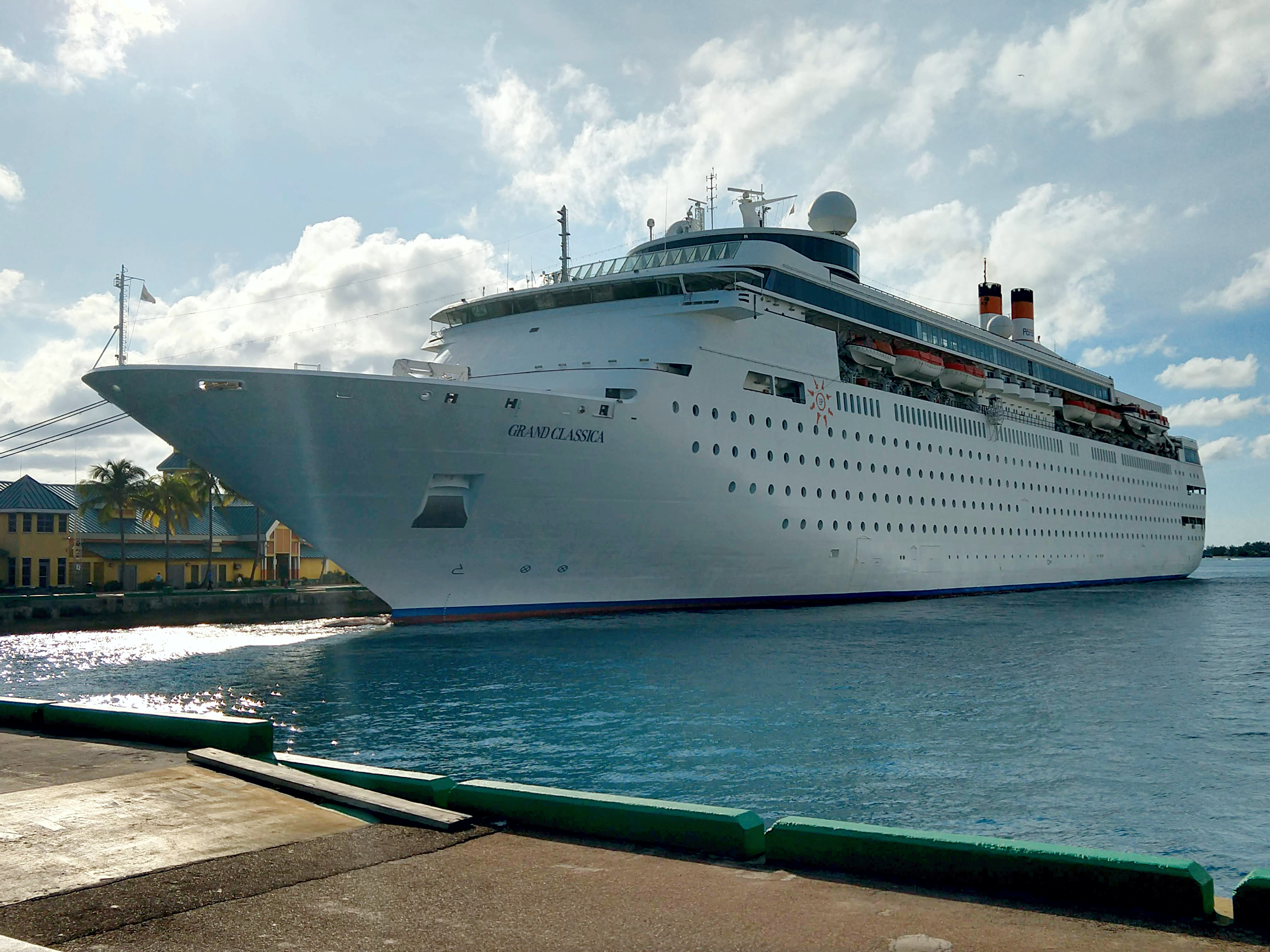
- Grand Classica in Nassau, Bahamas

Class overview
- Builders: Fincantieri, Marghera, Italy
- Operators: Costa Crociere; Bahamas Paradise Cruise Line; Celestyal Cruises
- Preceded by: Marina class
- Succeeded by: Victoria class
- Built: 1991–1993
- In service: 1991–present
- Planned: 2
- Completed: 2
- Active: 1
- Scrapped: 1

General characteristics
- Type: Cruise ship
- Tonnage: 52,926 GT-53,049 GT; 7,781 DWT
- Length: 722 ft (220 m); 181.9 m (596 ft 9 in) pp
- Beam: 102 ft (31 m)
- Draft: 25 ft (7.6 m)
- Decks: 14
- Propulsion: 4 × diesel engines, 2 shafts, 22,800 kW (30,600 hp)
- Speed: 18.5 knots (34.3 km/h; 21.3 mph) (normal); 20 knots (37 km/h; 23 mph) (maximum)
- Capacity: 1,308 passengers (normal); 1,680 passengers (maximum)
- Crew: 620

The Classica-class cruise ship is a class of cruise ships originally built for and operated by Costa Cruises. They were built prior to Carnival Corporation & plc purchasing the cruise line in 1997. The first ship was built in 1991 as the Costa Classica. It was followed by a sister ship named the Costa Romantica in 1993. Both ships were operated by Costa for over 20 years. As of 2021 both ships have since left the fleet. The oldest vessel is still in service while the newer vessel has since been sold for scrap.

== Ships ==
Ship	Year Built	Years In Operation	Tonnage	Operational History	Image
Margaritaville at Sea Paradise	1991	1991-On	52,926 GT	Built and operated for Costa Cruises from 1991 until 2018. Originally named Costa Classica, it was renamed Costa neoClassica following a refurbishment in 2014. It was sold to Bahamas Paradise Cruise Line in 2018 and renamed the Grand Classica. It was renamed Margaritaville at Sea Paradise under the same ownership but rebranded Margaritaville at Sea in April 2022.	
Costa Romantica	1993	1993-2020	53,049 GT Originally 52,926 GT	Built and operated for Costa Cruises from 1993 until 2020. Originally named Costa Romantica. It was renamed to Costa neoRomantica following a refurbishment in 2011. It was sold to Celestyal Cruises in 2020 but never saw service. It was sold to Beacon & Bay Shipping Services in 2021 and renamed the Antares Experience. Later that year the ship was sold for scrap and beached at the Gadani Ship Breaking Yard in Pakistan for scrapping in December 2021.	
