= Costa neoRomantica =

Cruise ship

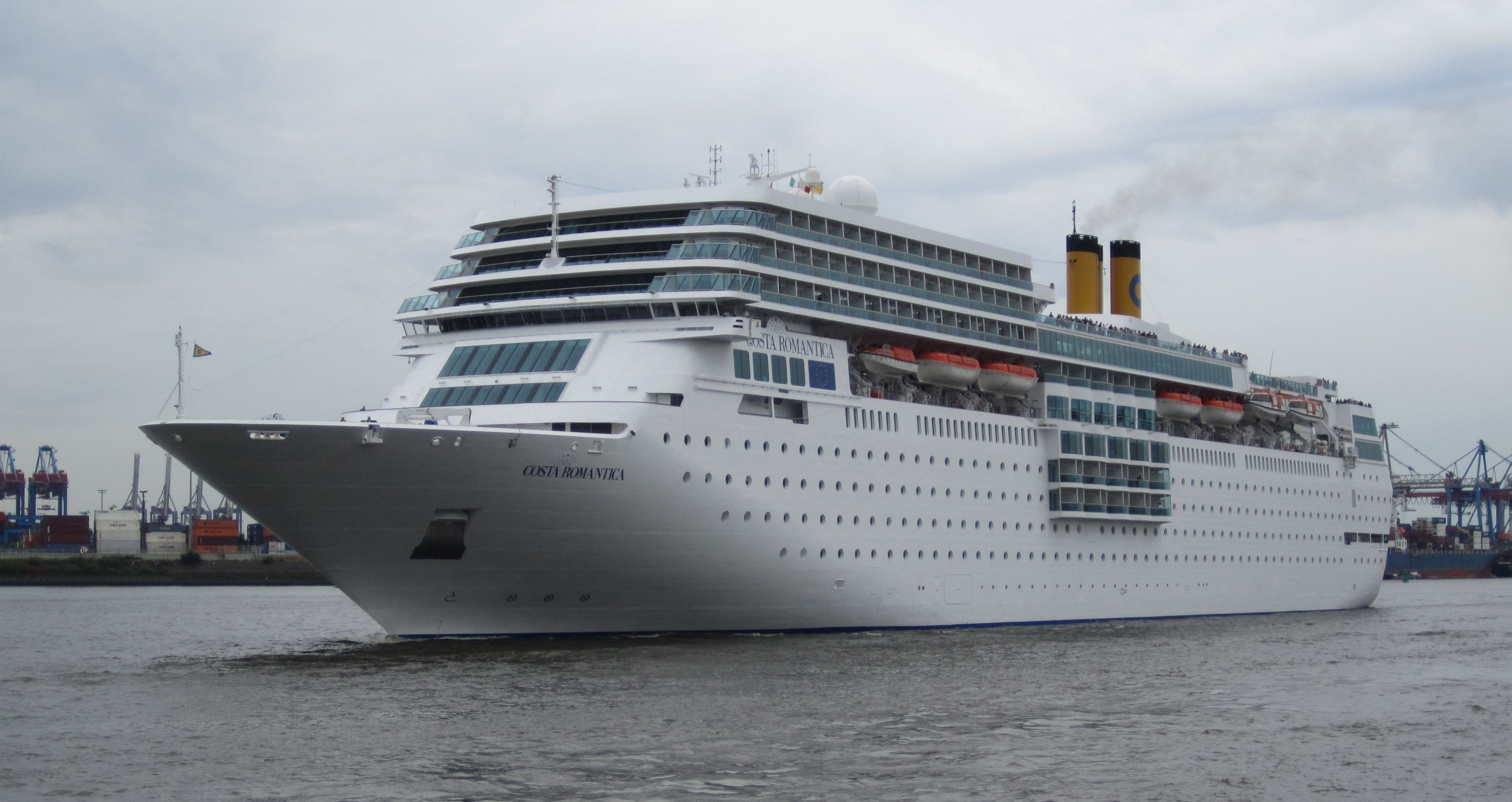
- Costa neoRomantica in Hamburg in 2012.

History
- Name: 1993–2011: Costa Romantica; 2011–2020: Costa neoRomantica; 2020–2021: Celestyal Experience; 2021: Antares Experience
- Owner: Costa Cruises (1993–2020); Celestyal Cruises (2020–2021); Beacon & Bay Shipping Services (2021)
- Operator: Costa Cruises (1993–2020)
- Port of registry: 1993–2020: Genoa, Italy; 2020–2021: Limassol Cyprus; 2021: Monrovia, Liberia
- Builder: Fincantieri, Marghera, Italy
- Yard number: 5899
- Laid down: 23 April 1992
- Launched: 28 November 1992
- Completed: 25 September 1993
- Maiden voyage: November 1993
- In service: 1993
- Out of service: January 2020
- Identification: IMO number: 8821046; Call sign: IBCR (1993–2020); MMSI number: 247817000 (1993–2020)
- Fate: Scrapped at Gadani, Pakistan in 2021.

General characteristics as built
- Class & type: Classica-class cruise ship
- Tonnage: 53,049 GT; 7,781 DWT
- Length: 220 m (721 ft 9 in) oa; 181.9 m (596 ft 9 in) pp
- Beam: 30.8 m (101 ft 1 in)
- Decks: 12
- Propulsion: 4 × diesel engines, 2 shafts, 22,800 kW (30,600 hp)
- Speed: 19.5 knots (36.1 km/h; 22.4 mph)
- Capacity: 1,578 passengers
- Crew: 662

MS Costa neoRomantica was a cruise ship completed for Costa Cruises in 1993 by Fincantieri in Italy as Costa Romantica, and a sister ship to Costa Classica. She was refurbished in 2003, renamed Costa neoRomantica in 2011, and from 2017 assigned to the Asian market. The ship was sold in 2020 to Celestyal Cruises as Celestyal Experience. She never operated for Celestyal and was sold again and renamed Antares Experience in September 2021, then beached for demolition at Gadani, Pakistan in December 2021.

== Design and description ==
The vessel as built had a gross tonnage of 53,049 tons and 7,781 tons deadweight (DWT). Costa Romantica measured 220 m (721 ft 9 in) long overall and 181.9 m (596 ft 9 in) between perpendiculars with a beam of 30.8 m (101 ft 1 in). The vessel was powered by four diesel engines with two propellers creating 22,800 kW (30,600 hp). This gave the ship a maximum speed of 19.5 knots (36.1 km/h; 22.4 mph).

In November 2011, Costa Romantica underwent a refurbishing. Two new half decks were added as a part of the refurbishment, as well as 111 new cabins, 120 cabins and suites with a balcony and several new amenities including bars and lounges. This increased the gross tonnage of the ship from 53,000 to 56,769 tons. The length was increased to 220.6 m (723 ft 9 in).

The cruise ship had capacity for 1,578 passengers in 789 cabins. Cabins ranged in size from 17.2–40 m^{2} (185–431 sq ft) of which 74 had a balcony. The ship had a crew of 662.

== Construction and career ==
The vessel was constructed by Fincantieri at their yard in Marghera, Italy with the yard number 5899. The cruise ship's keel was laid down on 23 April 1992 and the vessel was launched on 28 November 1992. Costa Romantica was completed on 25 September 1993 and entered service in November of that year. The vessel was registered in Genoa, Italy and was owned and operated by Costa Crociere.

On 25 February 2009, a small fire erupted in one of the engines and in one of the electric generators of Costa Romantica off the coast of Uruguay, about 10 km (6.2 mi) from the city of Punta del Este. After the incident, the vessel was stalled for more than 24 hours and for a long period there was no electricity or running water. Costa Romantica was partially repaired and was able to sail to approximately 1 km (0.62 mi) from the coast where she was then evacuated by landing ships. The passengers were sent home and Costa Romantica's next scheduled cruise was cancelled.

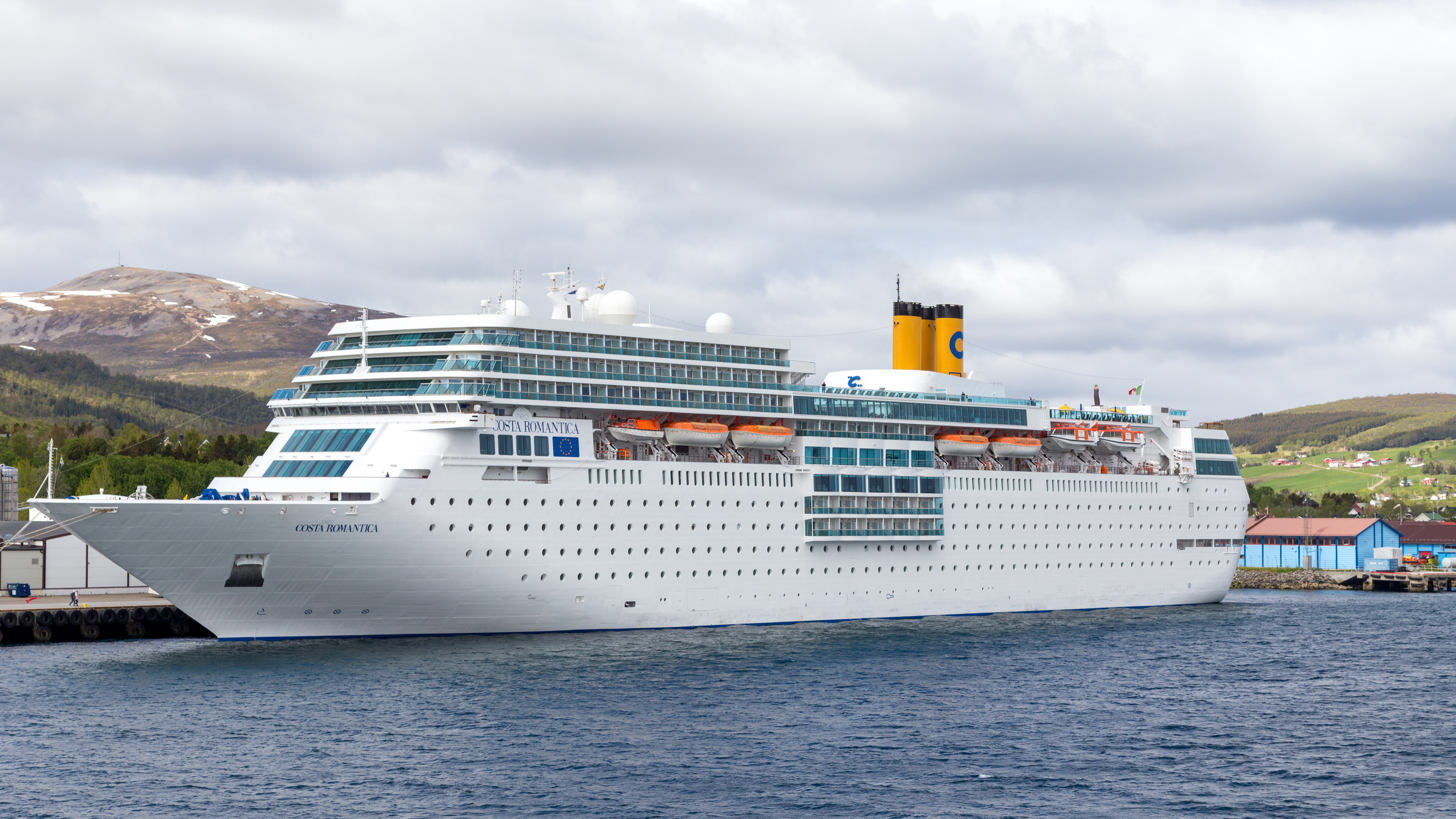
Costa neoRomantica at Sortland

Costa Romantica underwent a €90 million refurbishing at San Giorgio del Porto shipyard in Genoa in November 2011. After the contract was awarded to San Giorgio del Porto, the shipyard workers at Fincantieri began a week of strike action. After the refurbishing, the ship was renamed Costa neoRomantica and started her first voyage with the new name in March 2012. In early 2017, Costa neoRomantica arrived in Hong Kong to operate cruises in the Asia market. In February 2018, Costa neoRomantica served as The J Winter Fashion Show 2018 setting in Hong Kong.

During the COVID-19 pandemic, cruises from China aboard Costa neoRomantica were cancelled at the end of January and early February 2020. This was later extended through the end of February. While awaiting permission to sail, the vessel remained in Vietnam. On 26 March the ship with no passengers on board, anchored at the roadstead of Vladivostok, Russia to refresh the ship with water, fuel, and food. However, it was denied entrance as the Russian sanitary officials stipulated the dock workers to be quarantined for 14 days. No COVID-19 cases on board were reported.

In July 2020, the ship was sold to Celestyal Cruises, renamed Celestyal Experience and laid up at Piraeus, later at Eleusis. In September 2021, due to the pandemic, Celestyal sold the ship, while still in lay-up, to Beacon & Bay Shipping Services of Dubai, who renamed her Antares Experience, reportedly for on-sale for future trading. It was later reported that she was sold for scrap. In November 2021, the ship sailed to the Gadani Ship Breaking Yard in Pakistan for scrapping and was beached on 3 December.
