= Hard Rock Hotel & Casino Tulsa =

Integrated resort in Catoosa, Oklahoma, U.S.

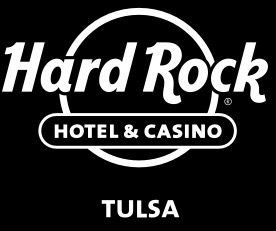

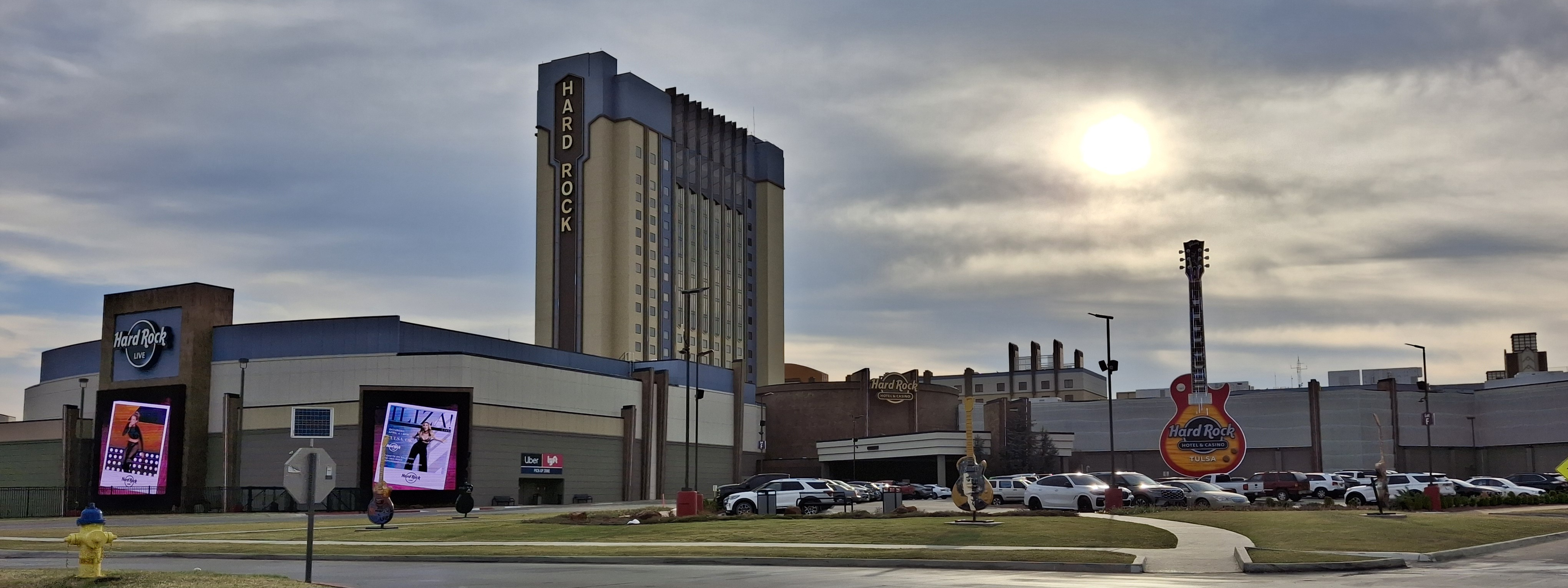
- South tower and Hard Rock Live (March 2026)
- Interactive map of Hard Rock Hotel & Casino Tulsa
- Location: Catoosa, Oklahoma, U.S.; 777 W. Cherokee Street, 74015; 36°09′53″N 95°45′51″W
- Opened: September 8, 2004; 22 years ago (as Cherokee Casino Resort); August 3, 2009; 17 years ago (as Hard Rock)
- Closed: November 2007; 19 years ago (as Cherokee Casino Resort)
- Theme: Rock and roll
- No. of rooms: 454
- Gaming space: 170,000 square feet (16,000 m^{2})
- Signature attractions: Hard Rock Live; Track 5
- Notable restaurants: Carvers on 19; HWY 66 Diner; The Eatery
- Casino type: Land-based
- Owner: Cherokee Nation
- Operating license holder: Cherokee Nation Entertainment (Cherokee Nation Businesses)
- Architect: EFG Design and Architecture; TBA Architects; WorthGroup Architects; TriArch Architecture
- Previous names: Cherokee Casino Resort (2004–2009)
- Renovated in: November 2007 – August 2009; 2011–2013; April 10, 2018 – February 7, 2019; May 2024 (McGill's Steakhouse, Carvers on 19)
- Website: Official website
- Building details
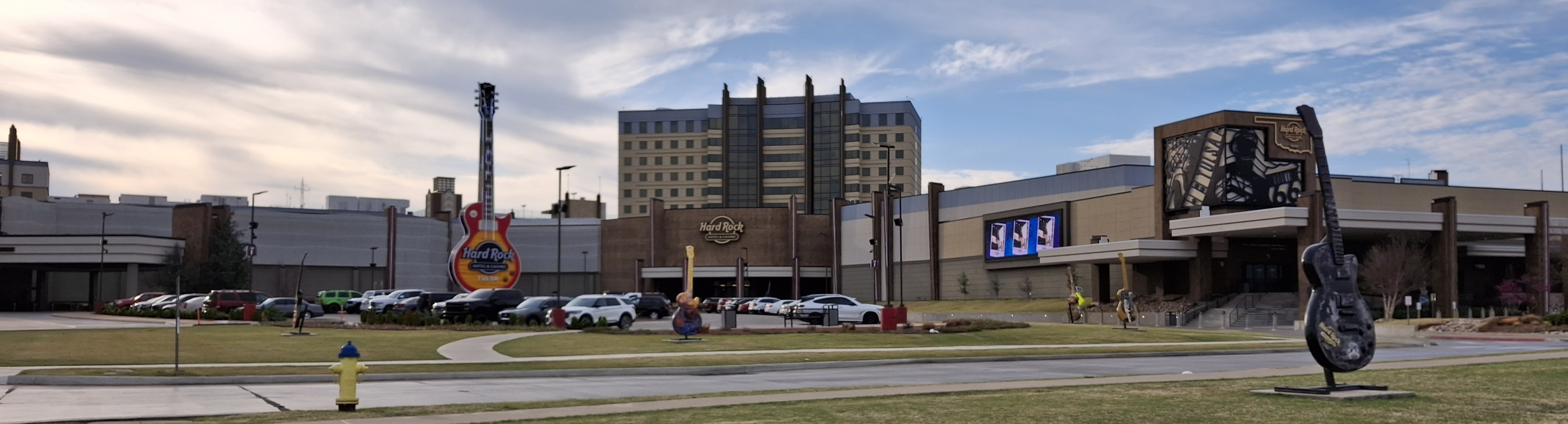
- North tower and casino entrance (March 2026)

Design and construction
- Main contractor: Flintco

Hard Rock Hotel & Casino Tulsa is an integrated resort in Catoosa, Oklahoma, United States, just off Interstate 44 in the Tulsa metropolitan area on land owned by the Cherokee Nation and managed by the tribe's hospitality division, Cherokee Nation Entertainment (CNE) under franchise from Hard Rock International.

The resort was formerly known as the Cherokee Bingo Outpost, which opened in September 1993. In December 2004, it was expanded into the Cherokee Casino Resort, and in late 2008, the Cherokees sublicensed the Hard Rock name from the Las Vegas property for the resort to undergo $155 million reconstruction and expansion, which opened in August 2009. Hard Rock International acquired the naming rights directly in September 2016, though the agreement still does not include a Hard Rock Cafe.

== History ==
=== Background ===
==== 1993–2004: As Cherokee Bingo Outpost ====
After the success of the Cherokee Nation's first bingo hall in Roland, Oklahoma, which opened in November 1990 and profited over $1 million, they approved a $3.1 million expansion plan in February 1993 that allocated funds to build two additional bingo venues, being one strategically positioned near Interstate 44 in Catoosa, and the other in West Siloam Springs. Cherokee Bingo Outpost opened on September 27, 1993, with 41,000 square feet (3,800 m^{2}) designed to seat roughly 1,400 players, and a modest staff of 80 employees.

The Catoosa Bingo Resort focused on Class II gaming as a result of the Indian Gaming Regulatory Act (IGRA), and under former Principal Chief Wilma Mankiller, the venue evolved into an aggressive revenue driver designed to fund tribal infrastructure, healthcare, and education.

==== 2004–2009: As Cherokee Casino Resort ====
Plans for the resort started in January 2004. On June 24 of that year, Cherokee Nation Enterprises (CNE) announced that the Cherokee Bingo Outpost would undergo a major expansion and renovation to become the Cherokee Casino Resort, with the last bingo games being held on the 4th of July. On September 8 of that year, the $80 million casino, restaurants and amenities held a soft opening, followed by a grand opening on December 7, introducing a seven-story, 150-room hotel tower and convention center.

=== 2008–2013: Development, opening, and early years ===
On November 14, 2008, CNE announced that they would expand, renovate, and reopen the property as Hard Rock Hotel & Casino Tulsa following a sublicensing agreement with Morgans Hotel Group and DLJ Merchant Banking Partners affiliate HRHH IP, LLC, a subsidiary of Hard Rock Hotel Holdings, LLC, operator of the Hard Rock Hotel & Casino Las Vegas, which had licensed the name from Hard Rock International. It was expected to be completed in April 2009, and the first phase of the massive $155 million, three-phase expansion took place the following month, adding 800 gaming machines on a larger 30,000-square-foot (2,800 m^{2}) casino floor, expanding the total to 2,300.

Cherokee Nation Enterprises changed its name to Cherokee Nation Entertainment on June 18, 2009. Hard Rock Hotel & Casino Tulsa had its grand opening on August 3 of that year, with a ribbon-cutting ceremony and the debut of a new, 19-story hotel. CNE used the sublicensing agreement to "distinguish itself" from other locations by being the "only Hard Rock in the Heartland." It was the seventh Hard Rock Hotel & Casino location in the world.

In late 2009, the resort would debut the Hard Rock Pool, directly inspired by the Las Vegas location. However, in February 2011, a blizzard that struck the Tulsa metro area led to heavy, dense snow of 12 to 15 inches causing a portion of the roof of the original casino floor to collapse. No one was injured, as patrons and visitors were evacuated before the roof fell. A new 10-story hotel and gaming tower was constructed on the site with a ribbon-cutting ceremony being held on its first two floors on September 28, 2012, bringing the gaming floor to 147,000 square feet (13,700 m^{2}) total and the introduction of the Replay Sports Bar. A full grand opening of the tower took place on March 25, 2013.

=== 2016–present ===
On September 30, 2016, Hard Rock International acquired all of the western territorial rights, informally the "Morton Territories", from Brookfield Property Partners affiliate BREF HR, LLC, which dissolved the sublicensing deal to have the Tulsa resort's name licensed directly by Hard Rock. A spa and pool were added to the property in 2017. On April 10, 2018, another expansion was announced by the Cherokees, starting with demolition of the 18,000-square-foot (1,700 m^{2}) western-themed portion of the resort built in 2002. Construction wrapped up on February 7, 2019, with the opening of Track 5, a two-story dance hall and saloon with over 7,000 sq ft (650 m^{2}).

== Features ==
=== Restaurants and entertainment ===
Toby Keith was at the Hard Rock's grand opening, though his restaurant, I Love This Bar & Grill, which debuted at the resort on July 27, 2009, with 10,000 sq ft (930 m^{2}) and a capacity of 350 people. The restaurant closed permanently on July 22, 2020, as a result of the COVID-19 pandemic. On September 30, 2010, The Joint, a 2,700-seat concert venue, would open, based on the Las Vegas venue of the same name, with a performance by the Doobie Brothers. The 45,000-square-foot (4,200 m^{2}) arena would be rebranded as Hard Rock Live on April 26, 2020.

Besides standalone restaurants, the casino also features its own food court with traditional eateries. A 1,700-square-foot (160 m^{2}) steakhouse known as McGill's opened in 2004, and moved to the top floor of the Hard Rock Hotel in 2010. By May 7, 2024, the steakhouse was undergoing a renovation, while Carvers on 19 would open later that month. McGill's temporarily relocated to the Sky Room, and construction on the renovation began in March of that year, designed by WorthGroup of Denver, Colorado and being done by local contractor Candor Building Solutions. The resort would host the World Series of Poker tournament from August 26 to September 7, 2026.

== See also ==
- Hard Rock Hotel & Casino Biloxi
- Hard Rock Hotel & Casino Sioux City
- Hard Rock Live (Hollywood, FL)
- River Spirit Casino Resort, a competitor in South Tulsa
- Seminole Hard Rock Hotel & Casino Hollywood
