= MSC Poesia =

Musica-class cruise ship operated my MSC Cruises

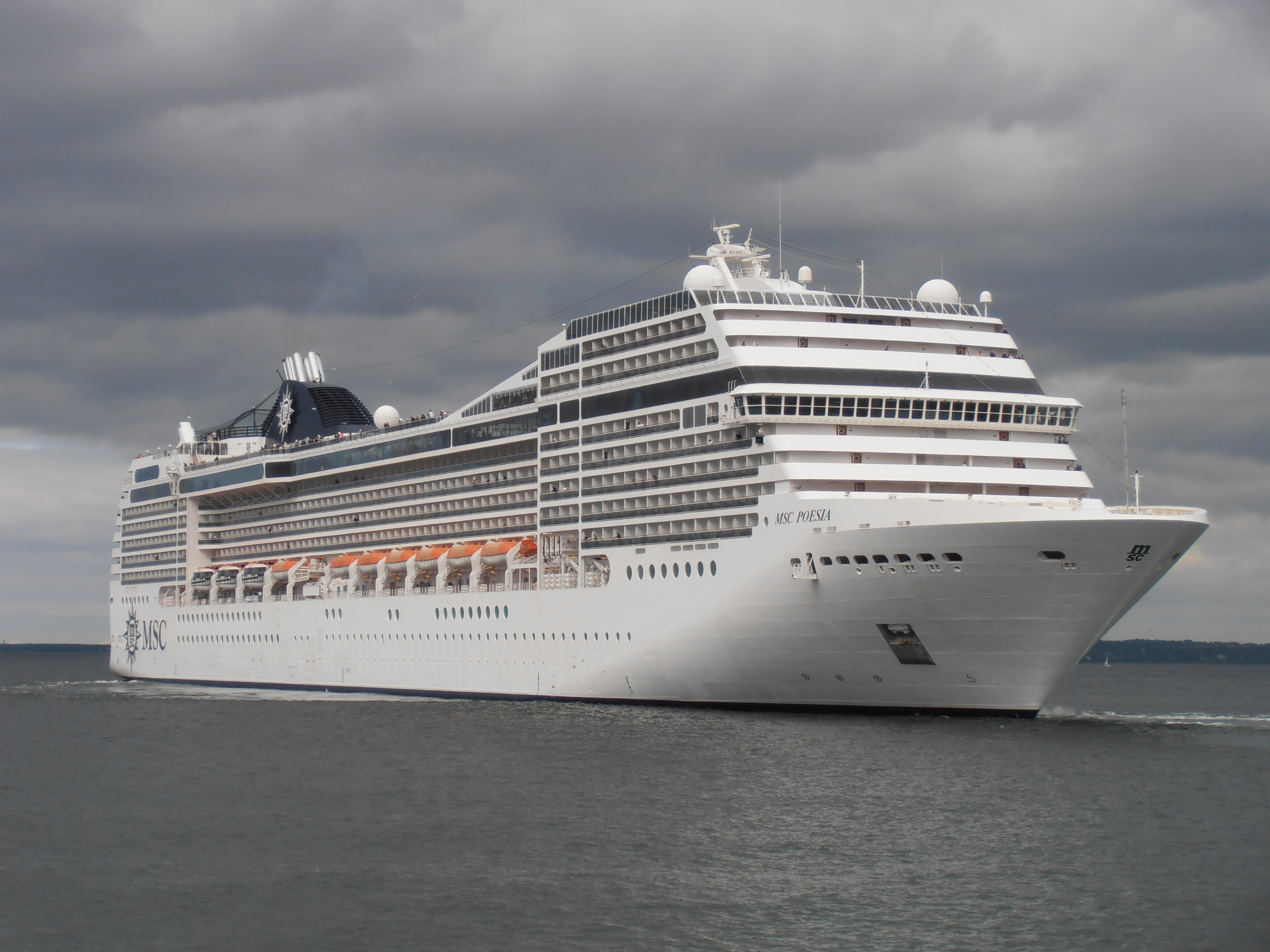
- MSC Poesia departing Tallinn, Estonia on 11 July 2012

History
- Name: MSC Poesia
- Owner: MSC Cruises
- Operator: MSC Cruises
- Port of registry: Panama
- Ordered: 1 March 2006
- Builder: Aker Yards (St Nazaire)
- Cost: $360 million
- Yard number: S32
- Laid down: 6 December 2006
- Launched: 30 August 2007
- Christened: 5 April 2008 by Sophia Loren in Dover
- Maiden voyage: 19 April 2008
- In service: 4 April 2008
- Identification: IMO number: 9387073; Call sign 3EPL4; MMSI 355931000
- Status: In service

General characteristics
- Class & type: Musica-class cruise ship
- Tonnage: 92,627 GT
- Length: 293.8 m (963 ft 11 in)
- Beam: 32.2 m (105 ft 8 in)
- Draft: 7.99 m (26.21 ft)
- Decks: 13 (passenger accessible); 16 (total)
- Installed power: 5 × Wärtsilä 16V38B (58 MW (78,000 hp) combined); 1 × emergency generator (910 kW (1,220 hp))
- Propulsion: Two 18,025kW screw propellers
- Speed: 22.5 knots (41.7 km/h; 25.9 mph)
- Capacity: 2,550 passengers (normal); 3,605 passengers (maximum)
- Crew: 1,027
- Notes: 13 elevators

MSC Poesia is a cruise ship owned and operated by MSC Cruises. She was built in 2008 by the Aker Yards shipyard in St. Nazaire, France. She is a sister ship to MSC Musica, MSC Orchestra and MSC Magnifica. She is the first ship in the MSC Cruises fleet to be officially named outside Italy, at the Port of Dover, England on 5 April 2008, by Sophia Loren.

MSC Poesia was the flagship of the company until she was displaced by MSC Fantasia, which entered service in December 2008. In 2008 and 2009, MSC Poesia sailed on a series of 7-night cruises from Venice to Italy, Greece, and Turkey. Since 2010 the ship sails in Northern Europe during the summer season.

== Career ==
On 6 June 2008, MSC Poesia and Costa Classica collided in the Adriatic Sea near Dubrovnik. No one was hurt, the damage was minimal, and both ships continued their scheduled itinerary with no delays. The cause was determined to be MSC Poesia's anchor loosening.

While heading to Port Lucaya near Freeport, Bahamas, on 7 January 2012, MSC Poesia ran aground on top of a reef. The grounding did not stop the beach-goers (maiden voyagers of the annual "Holy Ship!" music festival cruise featuring such popular dance music artists as Fatboy Slim, Dillon Francis, and Diplo), as tender boats were able to ferry passengers from anchorage (or reefage) to the shores of Port Lucaya. According to Captain Archer, a local captain in the port, "they waited for a tide to get high at 1800hrs she was pulled off with 4 tugs and a fifth standing by. At 2000hrs, she was free and continued on her journey at 19.5 knots to little Salvador. A statement from MSC Cruises was released: "In navigating the harbor off Port Lucaya in the Grand Bahamas, MSC Poesia ran aground at 6:50 a.m. Saturday morning. The ship and its guests were always completely safe and all onboard equipment and services continued to operate normally including all previously scheduled tender service and shore excursions."

On 22 February 2019, the ship was struck again, by sister ship MSC Orchestra. MSC Orchestra had been departing Buenos Aires, Argentina, when a navigational error caused her to crash into MSC Poesia. MSC Poesia only sustained minor bow damage.

On 22 February 2025, one crew member was reported missing. CCTV footage later showed that he had fallen overboard while the ship was navigating Brazilian waters, en route to Camboriú.

On 1 November 2026, MSC Poesia was detained by the US Coast Guard for an expanded port inspection. An 11-day cruise to Jamaica, Panama, Costa Rica and Honduras was cancelled.
