= Margaritaville at Sea Paradise =

Cruise ship built in 1991

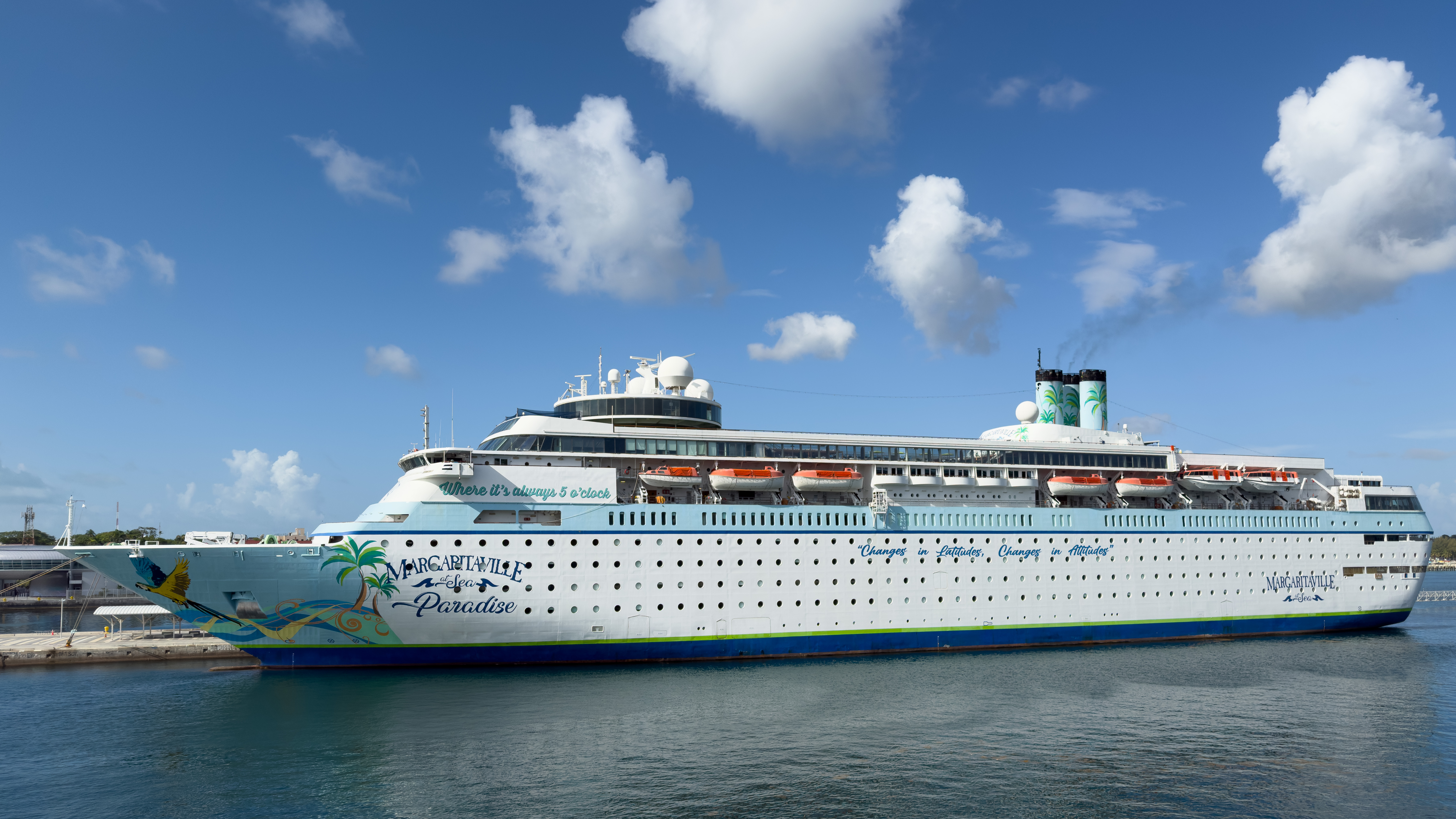
- Margaritaville at Sea Paradise docked at Nassau, Bahamas

History
- Name: 1991–2014: Costa Classica; 2014–2018: Costa neoClassica; 2018–2022: Grand Classica; 2022–present: Margaritaville at Sea Paradise
- Owner: 1991–2018: Carnival Corporation & plc; 2018–present: Classica Cruise Operator Ltd. Inc.
- Operator: 1991–2018: Costa Crociere; 2018–2022: Bahamas Paradise Cruise Line; 2022–present: Margaritaville at Sea
- Port of registry: 1991–1994: Naples, Italy; 1994–2000: Monrovia, Liberia; 2000–2018: Genoa, Italy; 2018-2022: Madeira, Portugal; 2022–present: Nassau, Bahamas
- Builder: Fincantieri, Monfalcone, Italy
- Yard number: 5877
- Launched: 2 February 1991
- Christened: Godmother Emilia Costa 1991
- Completed: December 1991
- Acquired: 7 December 1991
- Maiden voyage: 17 December 1991
- Renamed: 2014, 2018, 2022
- Identification: Call sign: C6EQ3; IMO number: 8716502; MMSI number: 311000969
- Status: In service

General characteristics
- Class & type: Classica-class cruise ship
- Tonnage: 52,926 GT
- Length: 220 m (721 ft 9 in) oa; 181.9 m (596 ft 9 in) pp
- Beam: 30.8 m (101 ft 1 in)
- Draught: 7.6 m (24 ft 11 in)
- Decks: 14
- Speed: 20 knots (37 km/h; 23 mph) max
- Capacity: 1,308 passengers (normal); 1,680 passengers (maximum)
- Crew: 620

Margaritaville at Sea Paradise is a cruise ship owned and operated by Margaritaville at Sea. The ship was built in 1991 in Italy for Costa Cruises as Costa Classica. In 2000, a planned lengthening and refit was cancelled at the last moment. She was renamed Costa neoClassica in 2014, then left Costa fleet in 2018 when sold to Bahamas Paradise as Grand Classica. Since May 2022, the ship has been sailing as Margaritaville at Sea Paradise, after the cruise line announced a partnership with Margaritaville Resorts & Hotels.

== Costa Classica ==
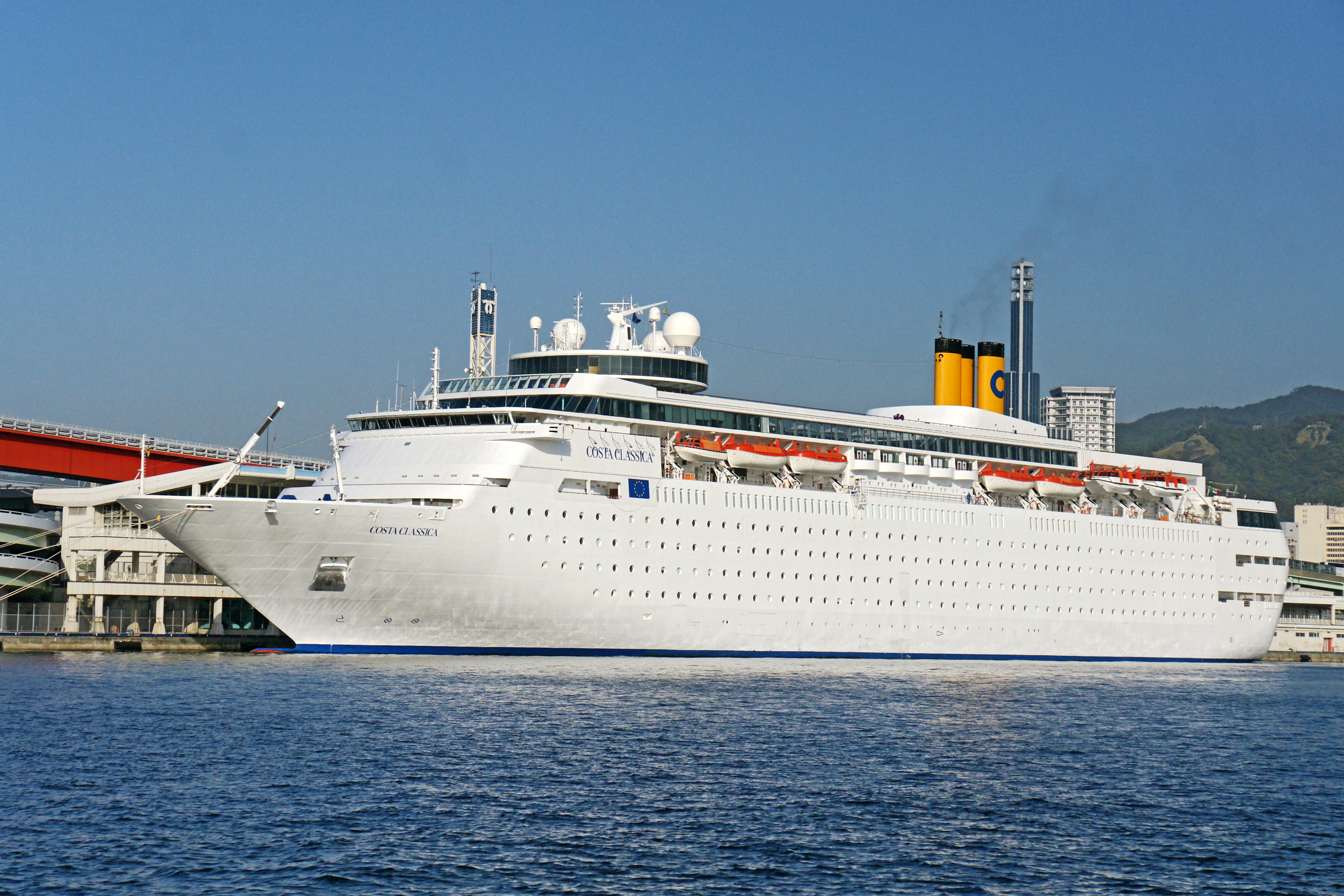
Costa Classica at Kobe

The contract for the Costa Classica was signed with Fincantieri Cantieri Navali Italiani in July 1987 with a value of $287 million. The ship was built as hull 5877 at Fincantieri's shipyard at Monfalcone, completed in 1991, and was Costa Cruises' first purpose-built newbuild since Eugenio C in 1966. The first of two Classica-class sister ships, the other being Costa Romantica, she was intended for Costa's new Euroluxe concept. The ship interior and exteriors were designed by Italian firm Gregotti Associati. The custom artwork on board was by Arnaldo Pomodoro, Emilio Tadini, Sergio Benvenuti, Isaac Maimon and Augusto Vignali. The ship was topped with Costa's trademark funnels. On board were two restaurants, 9 bars, 2 swimming pools, and 4 whirlpools.

=== 2000 lengthening refit cancellation ===
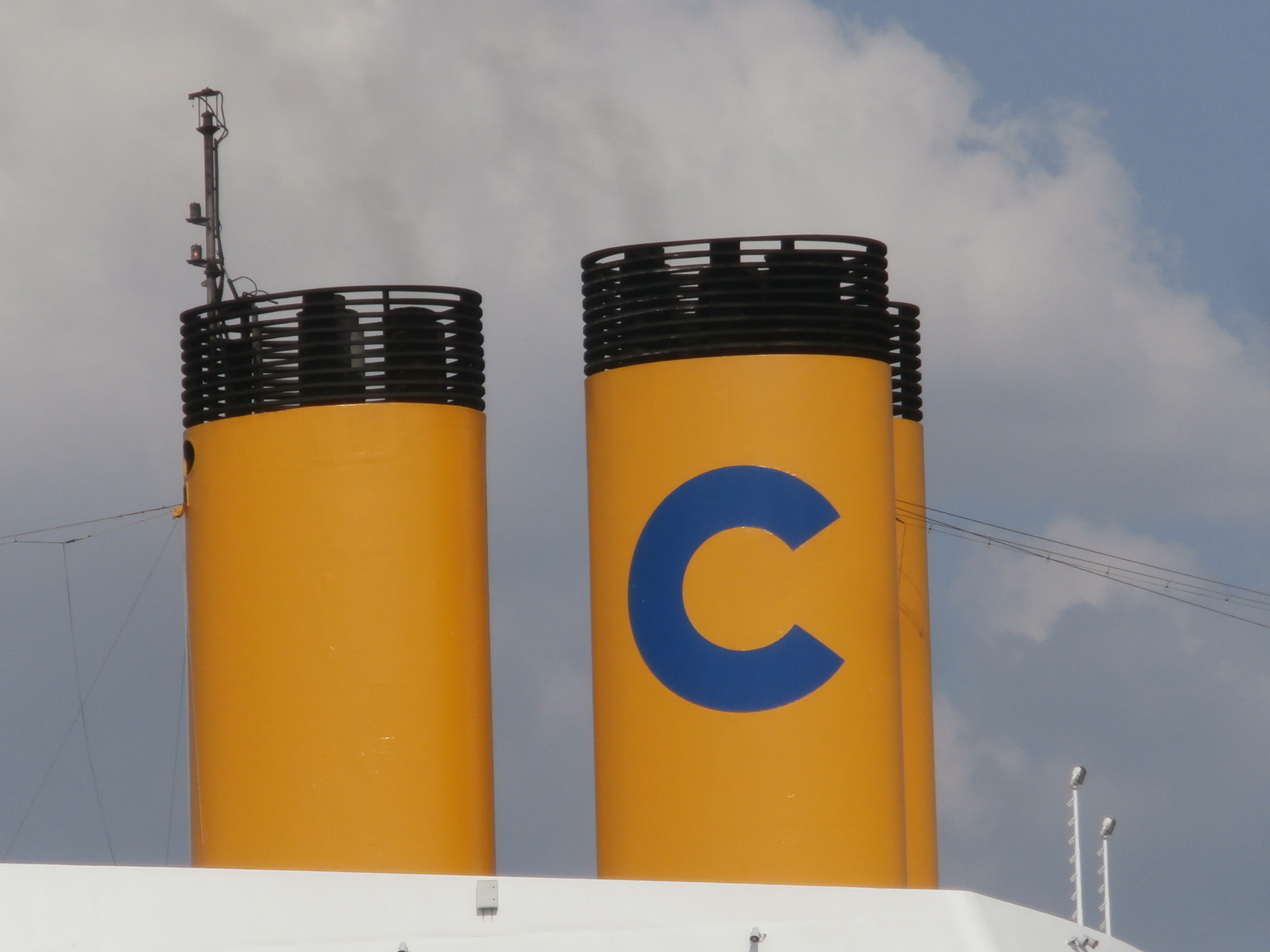
Costa Classica's trademark 3 funnels

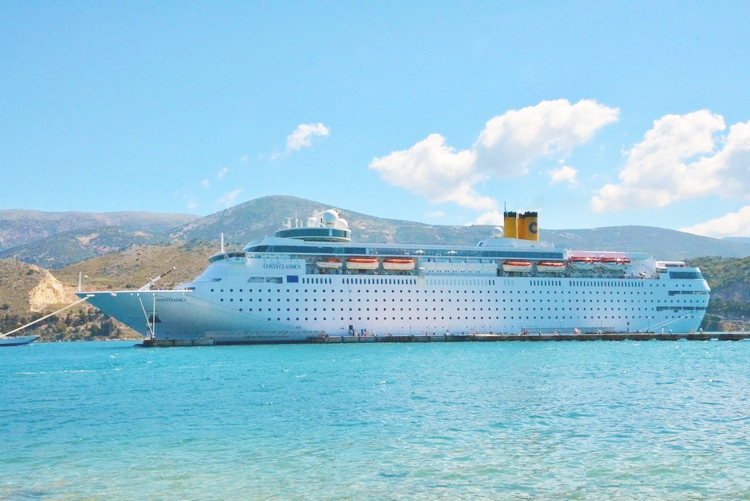
Costa neoClassica in Argostoli, Cephalonia, Greece

A major refit of Costa Classica was scheduled to have taken place between November 2000 and early 2001. In the summer of 1999, Costa contracted the United Kingdom shipbuilder Cammell Laird to construct a new 45 m (148 ft) midsection to lengthen the ship to 270 m (890 ft). The lengthening would also see a refit of the ship's interiors. The new section was constructed and ready for the ship's arrival. However, Costa cancelled the refit when the ship was due to arrive. This contract cancellation was in part responsible for causing the shipbuilder to go into receivership in April 2001. The constructed section that was built was never added to the ship. It was later sold and demolished for scrap.

=== Refit as Costa neoClassica ===
Costa Classica underwent a refit in 2014 to join the Costa neoCollection as the Costa neoClassica. It retained its original design while its sister ship the Costa Romantica underwent a €90 million refurbishing to become Costa neoRomantica. The sister ship received a complete overhaul which saw an increase in tonnage and additional cabins.

== Bahamas Paradise Cruise Lines ==
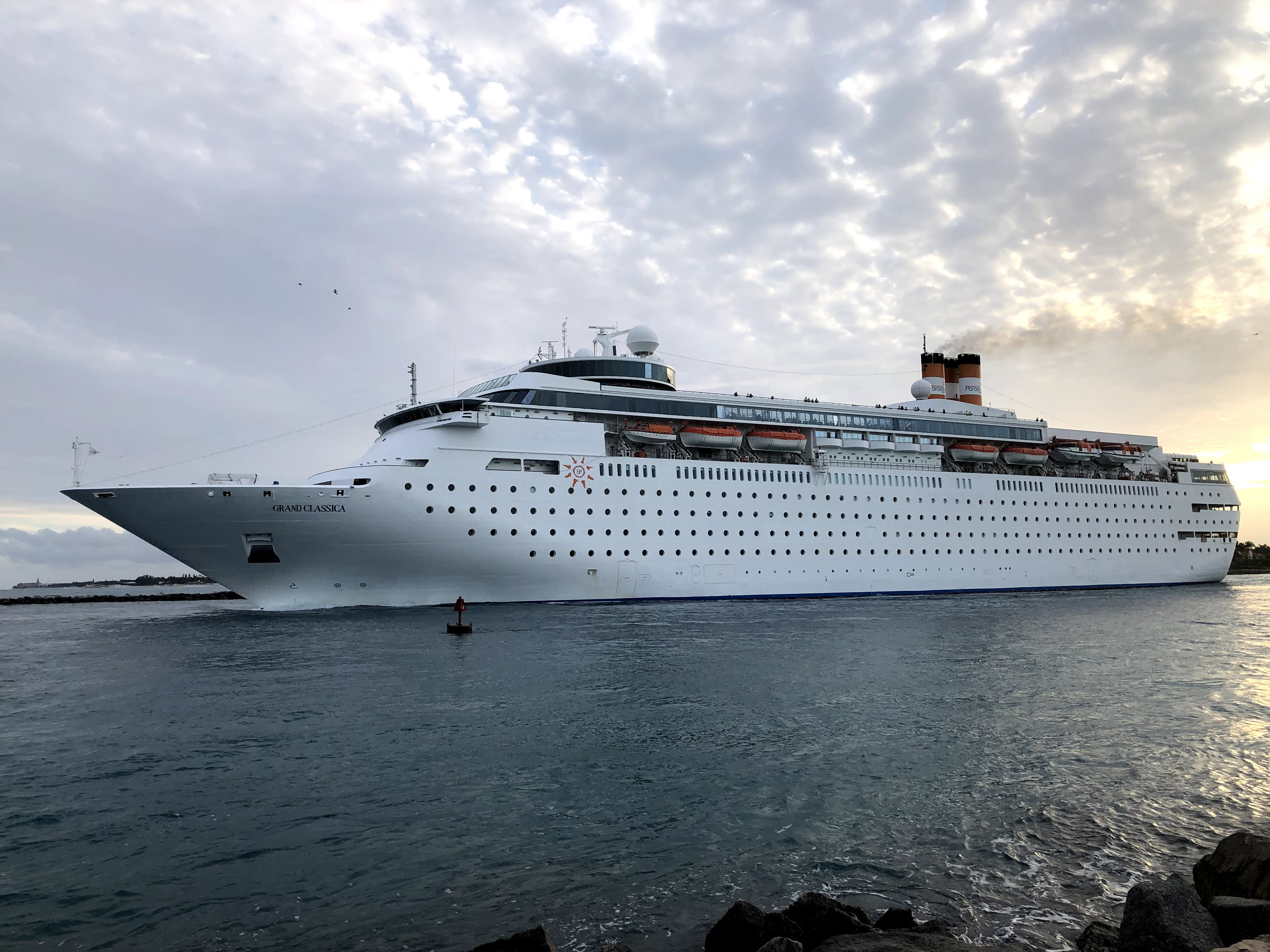
Grand Classica at Palm Beach

On 2 August 2017, Costa Cruises announced that the vessel had been sold to an unnamed buyer and would leave their fleet in March 2018. On 13 December, it was revealed that the ship had been purchased by Bahamas Paradise Cruise Line, who would rename the vessel Grand Classica. The ship began sailing out from the Port of Palm Beach on 13 April 2018, and initially operated 2-day round-trip cruises to Freeport, Grand Bahama Island. After Grand Bahama was devastated by Hurricane Dorian in 2019, the ship was rescheduled to operate 2-day round trips to Nassau that began on 12 October; the line's other ship, Grand Celebration, continued to sail to Grand Bahama. Grand Classica was taken out of service in March 2020 for a wet dock renovation and maintenance at Grand Bahama Shipyard that was scheduled through May, with a return to service in June. During the refit, the cruise ship industry was halted due to the COVID-19 pandemic and the ship remained laid up at Freeport. Following the November 2020 sale of the line's other ship, Grand Celebration, Grand Classica was slated to resume her Freeport sailings as soon as she was able to operate.

In June 2021, Grand Classica returned to the Port of Palm Beach in preparation for her return to service on 24 July. In September, she was chartered for a month to house Entergy Corporation workers restoring power in Louisiana following Hurricane Ida. Grand Classica arrived at New Orleans on 7 September. The ship resumed service from Palm Beach on 26 September.

== Margaritaville at Sea ==
On 8 December 2021, Bahamas Paradise Cruise Line entered into a partnership agreement with Margaritaville Resorts & Hotels to operate the brand on its behalf, beginning in April 2022. The line said that it expected to acquire more ships at a later date.

Grand Classica was renamed Margaritaville at Sea Paradise and received an extensive refit and rebranding at Grand Bahama Shipyard, Freeport, during April 2022. The renovated ship returned to the port of Palm Beach on 10 May, with the inaugural cruise taking place four days later. In May 2023, the ship underwent a 2-week drydocking before reentering service on 2 June, during which she was completely refreshed, featuring new dining venues, new menus, fitness center upgrades, a pickleball court, and two new theater shows.

Margaritaville at Sea intend to begin calls at Nassau, Bahamas in 2025.

== Incidents and accidents ==
=== MSC Poesia collision ===
On June 6, 2008, MSC Poesia and Costa Classica collided in the Adriatic Sea near Dubrovnik, after the anchor line became slack on MSC Poesia and she went adrift. There were no injuries, and the damage was minimal. Both vessels continued on their scheduled itineraries with no delays.

=== 2009 passenger disappearance ===
A Hong Kong woman and her son disappeared while on a cruise from Beijing to Fukuoka in July 2009. It was reported that three letters were found in their cabin concerning the distribution of their belongings. The agency Hong Thai Travel confirmed that the pair were among 35 tourists who boarded the cruise ship in Tianjin and its tour guide realized the pair were missing on 7 July. Costa Cruises said it had reported the incident to law enforcement bodies in Korea, China and Japan.

=== 2010 collision near Shanghai ===
On 18 October 2010, Costa Classica collided with the Belgian-flagged cargo ship Lowlands Longevity near the deep water channel of the Yangtze River as she returned to Shanghai from Jeju, Korea. Several passengers reported to the infirmary with minor injuries. Three passengers were sent ashore for further medical checks. News images showed a gash along the starboard side of Costa Classica that stretched about 60 feet, and well above the ship's waterline. Costa Classica docked a few hours after the incident and passengers on the current voyage of the ship were disembarked.

Costa Classica then sailed to Changxing, China to undergo an emergency drydock. It took just 96 hours to complete repairs, resuming service afterwards. The next voyage was resumed in Hong Kong on 25 October, two days short, and its Manila port destination was cancelled.

=== 2019 Grand Classica banned from entering Havana, Cuba ===
Viva Travel, a Florida-based travel agency, chartered Grand Classica for what was advertised as a Valentine's Day cruise to reunite Cuban exiles with their relatives aboard the vessel. Despite claims by the cruise line and travel agency that they had secured the necessary governmental approvals, the ship was denied entry and diverted to Nassau, Bahamas.
