= River Spirit Casino Resort =

Integrated resort in South Tulsa, Oklahoma, U.S.

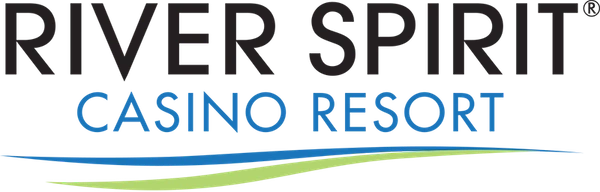

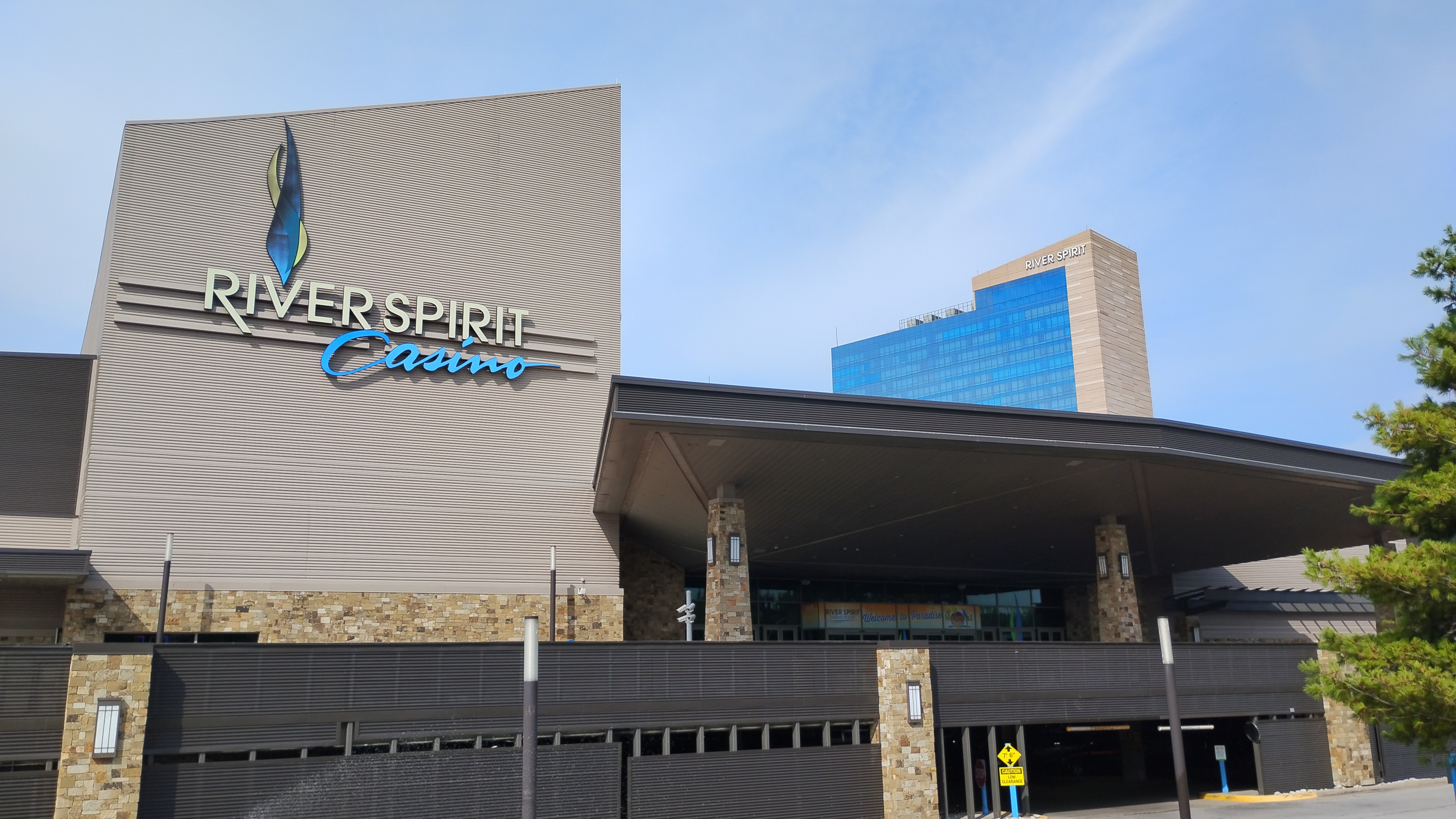
- Exterior view (Note: All images were taken August 2026)
- Interactive map of River Spirit Casino Resort
- Location: Tulsa, Oklahoma, U.S.; 8330 Riverside Parkway, 74137; 36°02′31″N 95°57′50″W
- Opened: March 31, 2009; 17 years ago (main casino); August 25, 2016; 10 years ago (expansion, December 28, 2016; 9 years ago for the hotel)
- Theme: Las Vegas style (River Spirit Casino Tulsa); Caribbean style (Margaritaville Casino & Restaurant)
- No. of rooms: 483
- Gaming space: 200,000 square feet (19,000 m^{2})
- Signature attractions: The Cove
- Notable restaurants: Jimmy Buffett's Margaritaville; Ruth's Chris Steak House; 5 o'Clock Somewhere Bar
- Casino type: Land-based
- Owner: Muscogee Nation
- Operating license holder: Muscogee Nation Gaming Enterprises
- Architect: Cuningham Group Architects, P.A. (Phase I); HKS, Inc. (Phase II)
- Renovated in: January–June 2024 (GRIDIRON Sportsbar & Topgolf Swing Suites)
- Public transit access: MetroLink Tulsa
- Website: www.riverspirittulsa.com
- Building details
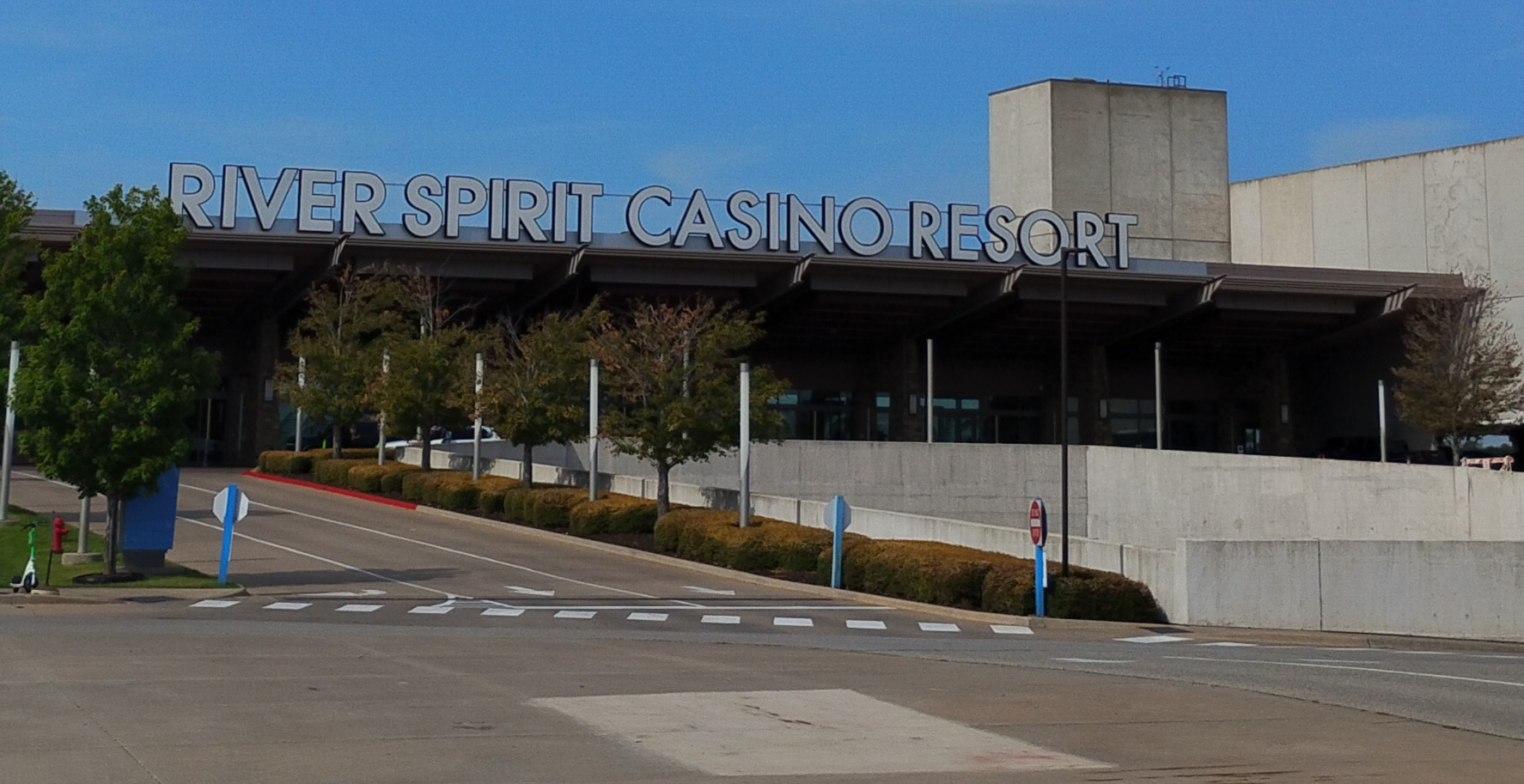
- Main entrance

Design and construction
- Main contractor: Flintco

Renovating team
- Main contractor: Manhattan Construction Group

The River Spirit Casino Resort is a casino hotel near the Arkansas River in South Tulsa, Oklahoma, United States. The property is split into two distinct casinos; the original, traditional Las Vegas-themed one which has been open since March 31, 2009, and the Margaritaville Casino & Restaurant, which opened on August 25, 2016 as part of a $365 million Phase II expansion and partnership with Jimmy Buffett's Margaritaville.

The resort features a 27-story, 483-room and 54-suite hotel tower, and the 2,500-seat Cove multi-purpose arena. It is owned and operated by the Muscogee (Creek) Nation. Creek Nation Bingo, a bingo hall, originally opened on the site before it permanently closed its doors a day before River Spirit opened. It was demolished in October 2021 for a warehouse and administrative building.

== History ==
=== Background ===
5,000 acres (2,000 ha) of tribal trust land where East 81st Street ends at the Arkansas River was originally used as a sand quarry and an oil pumping site. On November 17, 1984, the Muscogee (Creek) Nation opened a 27,000-square-foot (2,500 m^{2}), 1,350-seat bingo hall known as Creek Nation Bingo, operated by a South Dakota-based corporation known as Indian Country, U.S.A., Inc. The hall attracted tourists from as far as St. Louis, Missouri, with its jackpots exceeding $20,000, and was notable for being the birthplace of MegaBingo.

However, the bingo hall worked too well, ultimately leading to a lawsuit in early 1985 led by Tulsa County District Attorney David Moss and the Oklahoma Tax Commission (OTC) to shut it down due to illegal gambling, tax evasion, and that it would inevitably be a target for crime. The Muscogee Nation and Indian Country filed a countersuit, arguing that the bingo hall was on sovereign tribal trust land, meaning it did not have to follow state civil and criminal laws, and also stated that the state was just targeting them because the facility was economically successful, generating revenue designated to fund critical tribal healthcare and housing programs.

On December 12, 1985, after cross-contamination, state prosecutors were forced to admit they did not have evidence that the Creek Nation Bingo had attracted crime. Later that month, U.S. District Judge James O. Ellison ruled that the bingo hall was immune to state regulation and state sales tax as it was on tribal trust land. The state appealed the decision, but the 10th Circuit Court of Appeals and ultimately the U.S. Supreme Court allowed Ellison's ruling to stand. This legal battle led to Congress to pass the Indian Gaming Regulatory Act (IGRA) of 1988.

=== 2005–2009: Development and opening ===
On November 8, 2005, a groundbreaking ceremony was held by the tribe to build Phase I of converting Creek Nation Bingo into a casino hotel initially planned to be branded Creek Nation Casino Tulsa. On October 28, 2008, Muscogee Nation Chief A.D. Ellis revealed that the name of the $160 million casino was changed to River Spirit Casino, featuring 300,000 square feet (28,000 m^{2}) of gaming space 24 table games, 15 in a poker room, and a parking garage that could support 1,300 cars.

A hurdle during construction though was an infrastructure proposal regarding heavy helicopter logistics, as standard crane setups faced groundwater and unstable terrain restrictions since the casino was being built immediately adjacent to the Arkansas River. Because of this, Flintco, the project's general contractor, hired a massive, twin-rotor Chinook helicopter to lift and drop heavy HVAC onto the casino's roof, requiring approval from Tulsa police, fire departments, and the temporary closure of the River Parks jogging trails. Creek Nation Bingo permanently closed its doors on the night of March 30, 2009. The River Spirit Casino opened the following morning at 10:00 a.m. CDT with a ribbon-cutting ceremony, and the last day of March was known by management and the City of Tulsa as River Spirit Day. The new casino created 650 local jobs, totaling up to 1,300 employees.

A tribal blessing was held by Amos McNac, followed by a flute performance by Scott Harjo, and an invocation by National Council Representative Cherrah Quiett. Other activities would occur on May 1, 2009, with the giveaway of a 2010 Chevrolet Camaro and the appearance of Blues Traveler. The casino featured a Las Vegas theme.

=== 2013–2016: Margaritaville expansion ===
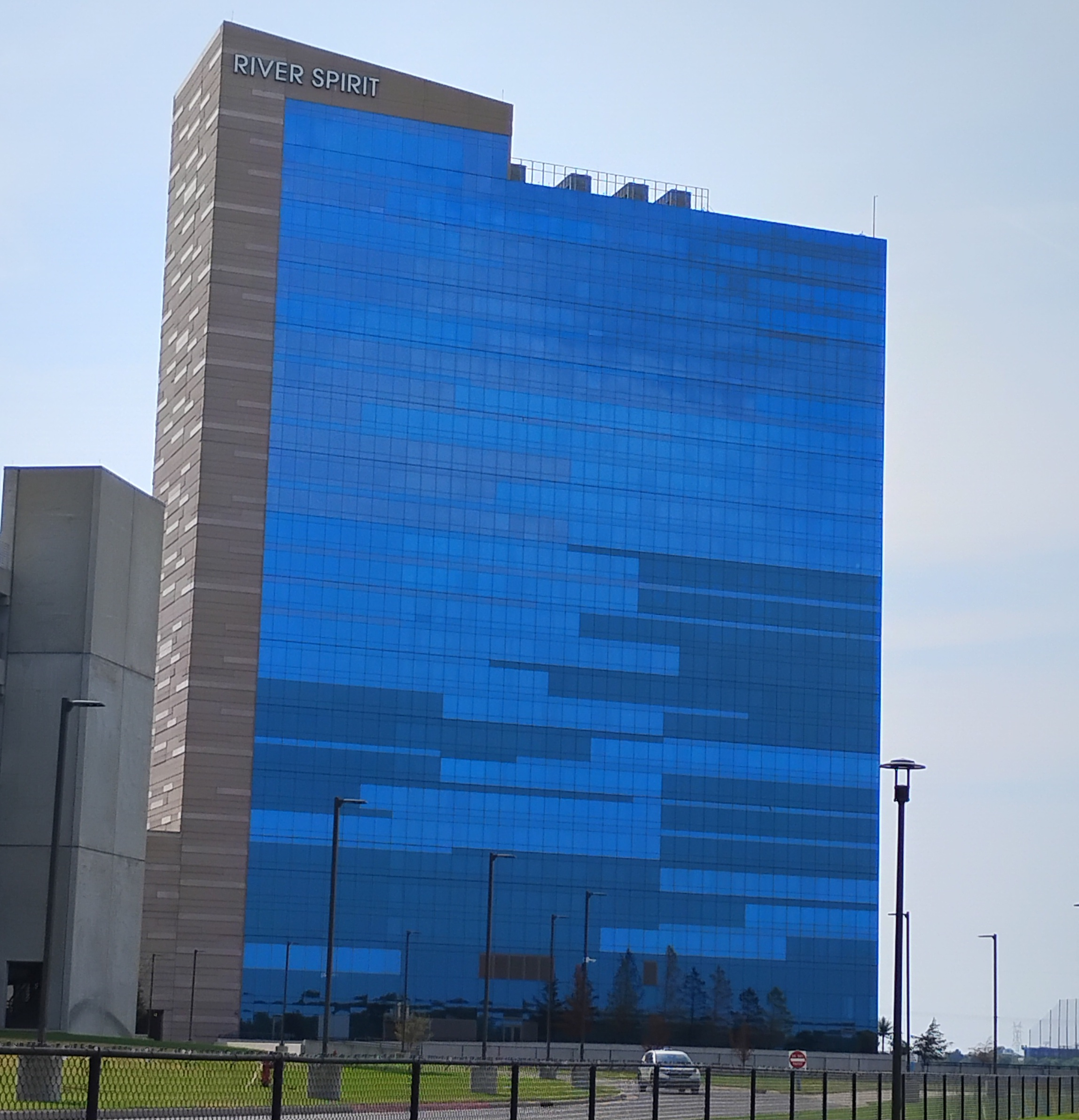
Exterior view of the hotel

On March 1, 2013, the Muscogee Nation announced a $250 million Phase II expansion that would add a 22-story, 500-room hotel, and the relocation of the River Parks trail to run west of the Arkansas River. On March 18 of that year, the Muscogee Nation announced a partnership with Jimmy Buffett's Margaritaville, and the expansion would be themed after the restaurant brand. The project held its ceremonial groundbreaking on October 15, with an updated price of $335 million. Construction began on November 19, 2014, with a final price of $365 million. A 1,500-space parking garage would be added, and the hotel's expected floors were increased to 27. The main contractor was Manhattan Construction Group, and the architect was HKS, Inc. of Dallas, Texas.

A job fair took place on May 28, 2015, to help seek 5,000 construction workers (Note: The exact estimated number of construction workers fluctuates depending on the source. The one for this claim, Indianz, cites 5,000, while this citation here cites over 4,000.) for the expansion. By January 31, 2016, the project's physical footprint would be over 1.2 million square feet (110,000 m^{2}), as the buildings held their topping-off ceremony that day. A yearly $135 million economic impact was expected for the 24-month construction phase, after it already had a $305 million economic impact. Phase I of the expansion debuted on August 25, 2016 with a ceremonial ribbon-cutting, opening the Margaritaville Casino & Restaurant to the public. 4,100 construction jobs were created to build the 50,000-square-foot (4,600 m^{2}) facility. The hotel followed on December 28, 2016 as Phase II of the expansion, with 483 rooms and suites, and 1,000 full-time jobs were created. This established the River Spirit Casino as an integrated resort.

=== 2020–present: The Riverline ===
Due to the COVID-19 pandemic, River Spirit Casino Resort temporarily suspended all operations overnight on March 16, 2020, following guidance from the CDC, though no cases of the virus had been reported on the property at the time. Other casinos managed by the tribe were also closed until further notice, with extensions throughout April and May. River Spirit reopened on June 1 of that year, though its hours were shorter and it had to enforce strict social distancing guidelines.

On October 22, 2021, it was announced that Creek Nation Bingo would be demolished and replaced with a 65,000 sq ft (6,000 m^{2}) warehouse and administrative building. On October 9, 2025, the resort's planned $200 million mixed-use development, known as The Riverline, was approved. The Muscogee Nation formed a joint venture with The Rainer Companies, securing a Tax Increment Financing (TIF) district from the City of Tulsa for funding. The project is planned to feature 200,000-square-foot (19,000 m^{2}) of retail and dining, alongside 775 multifamily units, spanning 37 acres (15 ha) along Riverside Parkway.

== Notable incidents ==
=== 2012 shooting ===
On November 18, 2012, a single gunshot was fired across Riverside Drive, shattering a window at the casino. Over 800 patrons were inside, and the facility went into lockdown for one hour and 30 minutes while the FBI, U.S. Marshals, and Muscogee Creek Nation Lighthouse inspected the area. No injuries occurred, nor was the shooter ever identified.

=== 2017 and 2019 bomb threats ===
On June 8, 2017, the resort evacuated everyone after it received anonymous bomb threats stating that a device would go off at 11 a.m. CDT. However, that never happened, and people were allowed to re-enter afterwards. Another bomb threat was sent on December 14, 2019, and it also never happened, leading to patrons to be allowed back in by 5 a.m. CST.

=== 2019 Arkansas River floods ===
On May 22, 2019, River Spirit Casino Tulsa closed temporarily due to the Arkansas River floods. The Muscogee Nation safely evacuated everyone inside the building, and since the main utility systems were underground making them vulnerable to water damage, power was also shut off. A later announcement by the tribe confirmed that Ruth's Chris, the Margaritaville Casino and Restaurant, and the hotel remained dry and not structurally damaged, but the water began to seep into the interior of the resort's Pool Deck floor (as well as the pool itself), and the Tiki Bar, Fitness Center, and resort spa were also affected. The resort reopened on June 21, 2019. The 1,600+ workforce continued being paid during the remediation.

=== 2026 drowning ===
On June 16, 2026, a man tragically drowned in the Arkansas River near the property after entering the deep water and strong currents adjacent to the shoreline. After an extensive search, his body and belongings were recovered.

== Features ==
=== Overview and amenities ===
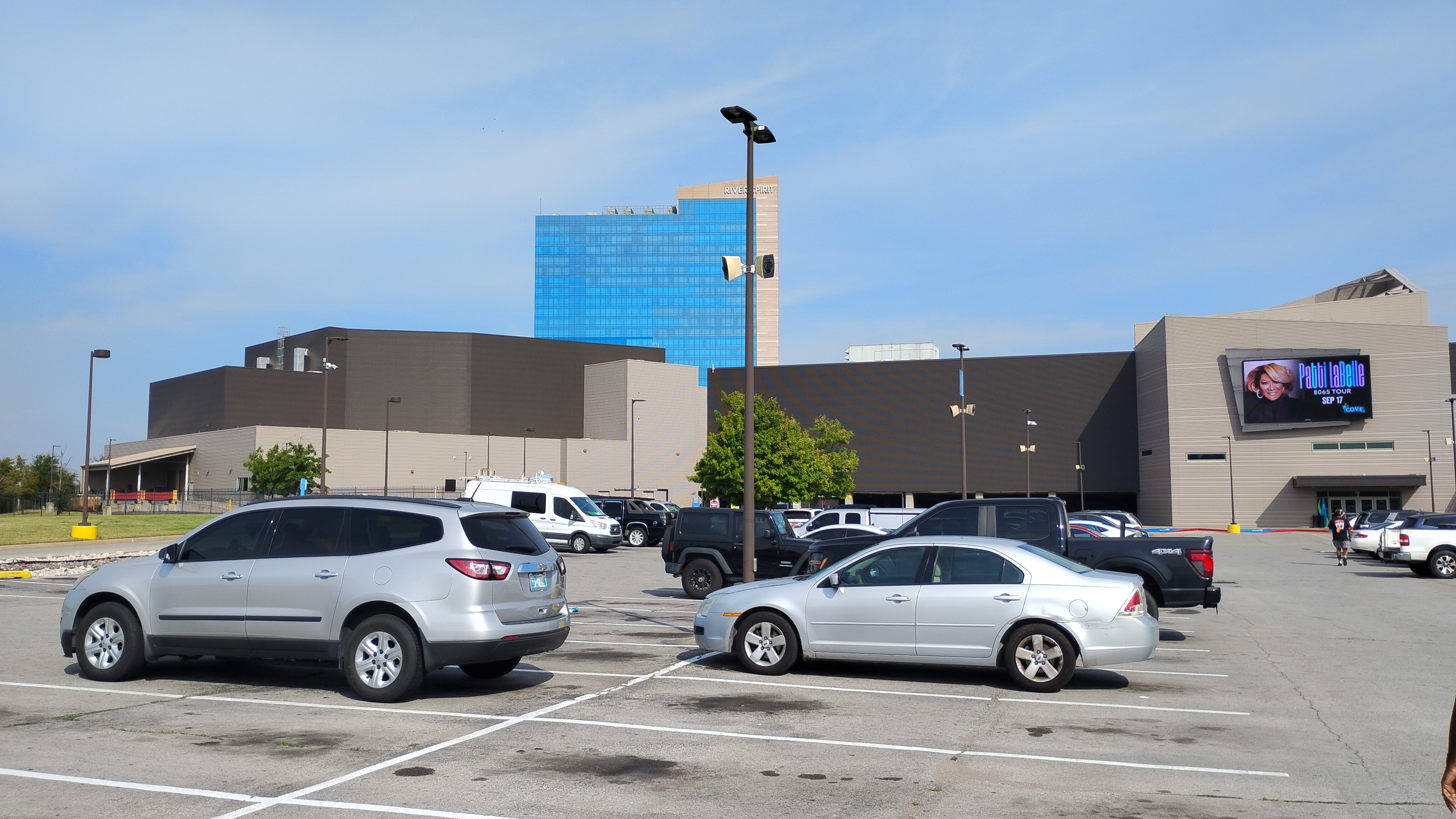
North parking lot and entrance

When the casino was ready to open on March 31, 2009, it had 300,000 square feet (28,000 m^{2}) of gaming space, with 2,700 electronic gaming machines. When the 50,000-square-foot (4,600 m^{2}) Jimmy Buffett's Margaritaville Casino and Restaurant opened on August 25, 2016, River Spirit became "two casinos in one." However, the expansion decreased the total gaming space to over 200,000 square feet (19,000 m^{2}). The Margaritaville Casino had 850 games and 27 tables at launch, bringing the total to 3,100. Margaritaville Casino & Restaurant features tropical memorabilia themed after Jimmy Buffett's Margaritaville itself.

The 27-story, 483-room and 54-suite hotel at the River Spirit Casino welcomed its first guests on New Year's Day 2017. The Emerge Spa & Salon, fitness center, and poolside salon debuted on February 23 of that year. The LandShark Pool Bar followed on April 28, marking the sixth and final phase of the Margaritaville expansion.

=== Restaurants and entertainment ===
When the casino debuted on March 31, 2009, it originally featured Elements Steakhouse and Grille, Visions Buffet, Rain Bay Café, and the Scoreboard Sports Bar.

When the two-story Margaritaville Casino opened on August 25, 2016, it featured a 400-seat Jimmy Buffett's Margaritaville restaurant with a volcano attraction, alongside the 5 o'Clock Somewhere Bar (themed and named after It's Five O'Clock Somewhere), Fireside Grill, and Ruth's Chris Steak House.

The 2,500-seat Paradise Cove theater (later simply The Cove) opened on January 6, 2017 with a concert by Chris Young. Later notable performances included Charlie Wilson on the 14th, Don Henley on the 19th, Alan Jackson the following day, and an invitation-only concert by Jimmy Buffett himself on the 28th. The LandShark Tiki Bar & Dining opened on April 28 of that year. A $17.5 million renovation added GRIDIRON Sportsbar & Topgolf Swing Suites to the resort in late June 2024.

== See also ==
- Hard Rock Hotel & Casino Tulsa, which also had involvement from Flintco and is a competitor in Catoosa
- Seminole Hard Rock Hotel & Casino Hollywood
