= Riviera Resort & Spa Palm Springs =

General information
- Location: 1600 North Indian Canyon Drive
- Coordinates: 33.845709°N 116.543964°W
- Opened: 1959
- Renovated: 1974, 1984–1989, 2006–2008, 2020–21
- Cost: $3 million (original structures)
- Owner: Welcome Group Inc.

Technical details
- Floor count: 2 (original hotel structures); 3 (hotel addition, 1961)

Design and construction
- Architect: Homer Rissman (1959)

Website
- rivierapalmsprings.com

The Riviera Resort & Spa Palm Springs (Note: Known early on as the Riviera Hotel, and later as the Riviera Resort & Spa. Also referred to as the Riviera Palm Springs.) is a resort hotel in Palm Springs, California. It occupies 16 acres (6.5 ha), and includes 398 rooms, as well as 40,000 sq ft (3,700 m^{2}) of meeting and banquet space.

The property opened in 1959. It included the city's first convention center, and a golf course that operated for the next two decades. Ownership of the resort has changed numerous times since the 1960s. The property has been known as the Riviera for much of its history, sometimes operating under variations such as Holiday Inn-Riviera (1965–1969) and Hilton Riviera (1978–1988), in affiliation with Holiday Inn and Hilton Hotels respectively. It also once operated as the Radisson Palm Springs Resort (1988–1992), in partnership with Radisson Hotels.

The Riviera closed from 2006 to 2008 for a $70 million renovation. It closed again in 2020, during the COVID-19 pandemic, and was rebranded by the end of the year as a Margaritaville resort, becoming the chain's first location on the U.S. west coast. In 2024, the Riviera name was restored under new ownership.

The Riviera closed again in 2026 for a $100 million renovation, and will reopen in 2027 as the InterContinental Resort & Spa Palm Springs.

== History ==
=== Early years (1950s–1990s) ===
The property began as the Riviera, owned by Irwin Schuman and his brother Mark Schulman. (Note: Originally born as Irwin Schulman, he eventually had the "l" removed from his surname.) The name was copied from the unaffiliated Riviera hotel-casino in Las Vegas. Groundbreaking took place on March 21, 1959, and construction reached the halfway point four months later. The project ultimately cost $3 million. It opened at the end of October 1959, while construction was still underway in certain areas. A formal opening was held the following month. The hotel appeared in the 1963 film Palm Springs Weekend, and was popular among celebrities throughout the decade. Those who entertained at the Riviera included Bing Crosby, Jerry Lewis, Dick Contino, and members of the Rat Pack.

In 1965, the property was sold to the Holiday Inn chain, which rebranded it as the Holiday Inn-Riviera. The property had 400 employees at that time. Gotham Hotels, based in New York, purchased the property in 1969, renaming it the Riviera Hotel and Country Club. The Riviera had thrived under the Schuman/Schulman ownership, becoming popular for its entertainment, fine dining, and service. However, the subsequent owners failed to maintain this reputation, and the property entered bankruptcy in 1972. The brothers bought back the Riviera in 1974 and launched a renovation project to restore its past prominence.

It was renamed the Palm Springs Hilton Riviera Hotel in 1978, through a franchise agreement with Hilton Hotels, marking the latter's first property in Palm Springs. The partnership helped the Riviera to attract tourists and conventions outside of the Southern California area. Schuman continued managing the hotel until his death in 1983. The property was renovated later that year.

In 1984, the Schulman family sold the Riviera to Galadari Hotels, marking its first U.S. property. Further renovations were underway in 1985, with funding by HomeFed Bank. Half of the Riviera remained open during the renovation work, which was in response to competition from new hotels in the area. The project modernized the aging resort, gutting the rooms and updating the 1950s architecture. An early idea was to demolish the Riviera and rebuild it from scratch.

Galadari filed for bankruptcy in 1986, and plans to sell the Hilton Riviera were disrupted when it went into receivership, with HomeFed soon taking it over. Additional renovation work took place in 1988, accompanied by a Radisson Hotels partnership. The property was renamed the Radisson Palm Springs Resort, and renovations concluded in 1989. A year later, the hotel was sold to Carpenters Pension Trust of Southern California, which later became Southwest CPT. The Radisson name was dropped in 1992, and the property once again became the Riviera.

=== Later years (2000s–present) ===
The Riviera closed on June 1, 2006, after it was sold to HBF Noble House LLC, a partnership of Noble House Hotels Resorts and HBF Holdings. The hotel's contents were liquidated, as the new owners launched a two-year, $70 million renovation of the entire property, giving it a Hollywood Regency design. The Riviera reopened on October 15, 2008. Noble House bought out its partner in 2012, and sold the Riviera to Apollo Global Management in 2015, for $44 million. Apollo owned the hotel through AGRE DCP Palm Springs, a joint venture with DiNapoli Capital Partners. In 2016, the Riviera joined Starwood's Tribute Portfolio, which consists of independent upscale hotels.

The Riviera closed in March 2020, when the COVID-19 pandemic reached California. Later that year, plans were announced to convert the property into a Margaritaville resort. The rebrand was already being planned prior to the pandemic, and the resulting closure allowed renovations to be expedited. It reopened on November 25, 2020, as Margaritaville Resort Palm Springs. It was the first Margaritaville resort to open on the U.S. west coast. The property's mid-century theming was removed in favor of a tropical setting, appealing to a more casual clientele, as well as families. Renovations concluded in 2021, with the debut of a new restaurant.

Some local residents believed that the Margaritaville theme was ill-suited for the former Riviera. On September 27, 2024, the property was sold to California-based Welcome Group Inc. and rebranded once more as the Riviera, in association with IHG Hotels & Resorts.

The hotel closed for a $100 million renovation in September 2026. It is scheduled to reopen in 2027 as the InterContinental Resort & Spa Palm Springs.

== Features ==
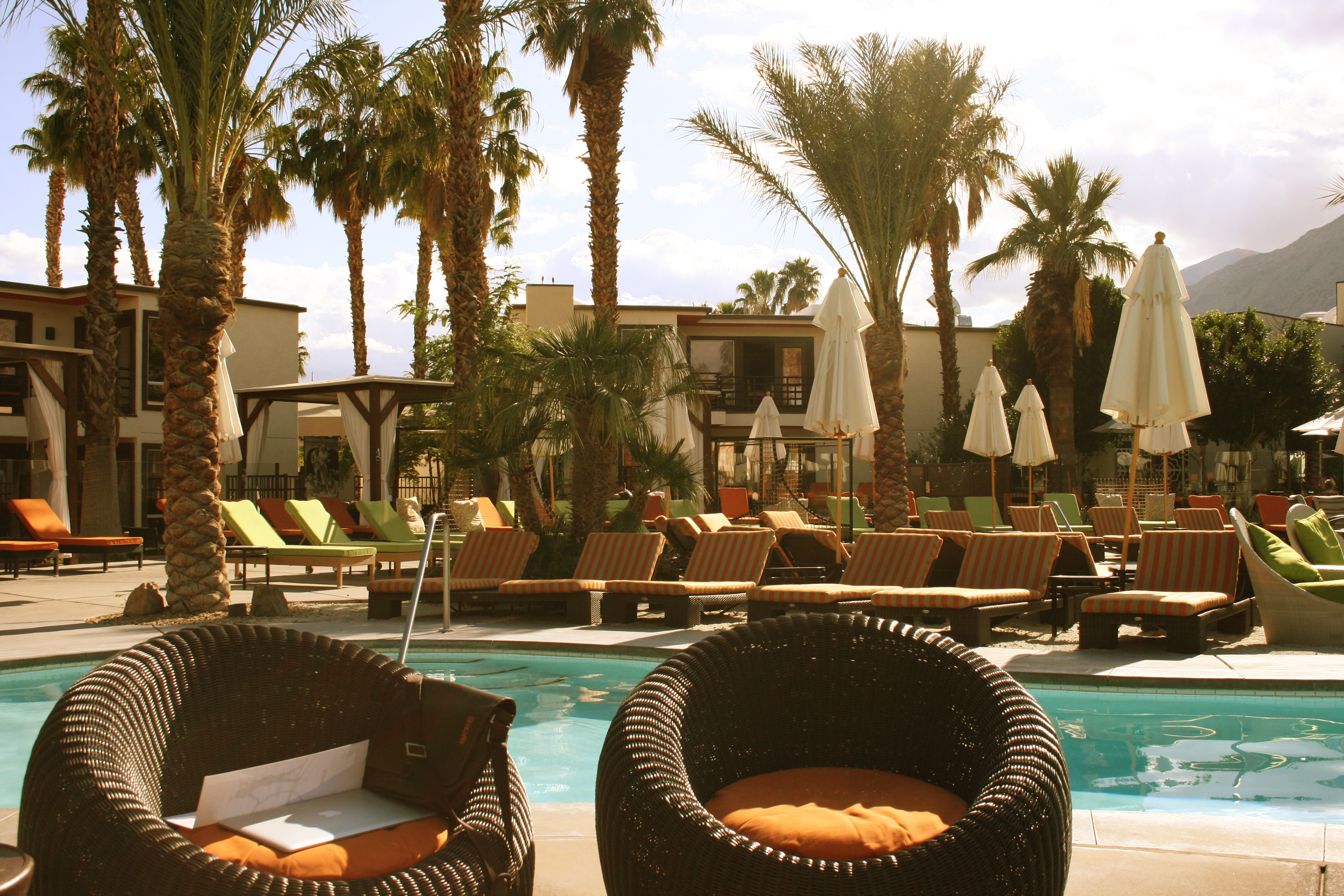
Courtyard pool area in 2010

The resort occupies 16 acres (6.5 ha), and includes two pools and a spa. The Riviera was originally designed by Las Vegas architect Homer Rissman. The hotel was built in a circular layout, with wings extending outward like spokes in a wheel, while a courtyard and pool occupy the center.

The two-story Riviera opened with 225 rooms. Two additional wings, both three stories, were added at the rear of the hotel in 1961. Further additions were being planned a few years later, ultimately bringing the room count to 525. As of 1969, it was the largest hotel in Palm Springs, and had also been the largest Holiday Inn location in the U.S. The property now has 398 rooms.

When it opened, the Riviera included Palm Springs' first convention center. It had capacity for 1,300 people, later increased to 3,000 with an expansion beginning in 1963. It was the only convention center in Palm Springs as of 1972. As Margaritaville, the property includes 40,000 sq ft (3,700 m^{2}) of meeting and banquet space. Since its original opening, the hotel has had numerous on-site restaurants.

=== Golf course and racquet club ===
The Riviera originally included a 14-acre (5.7 ha) golf course, located east and north of the hotel. The 30-par, nine-hole course measured 2,000 yards. In 1978, the course was redeveloped by Caravan International as Riviera Gardens, a 221-unit condominium project along the hotel's east side.

Caravan proceeded to build the Riviera Racquet Club, on leased hotel property just north of the resort. The club opened in 1983 and was available to hotel guests. The facility closed in 1986, due to financial problems. It was purchased and reopened later that year by entertainer Sonny Bono, who had a restaurant there that continued operating into the following decade. The club was eventually purchased by Carpenters Pension Trust along with the hotel, which then operated for some time as the Riviera Resort & Racquet Club. In 2018, the club was demolished and the land was redeveloped as "64 at the Riv", another condominium project.
