= Margaritaville Resort Casino =

Complex in Bossier City, Louisiana

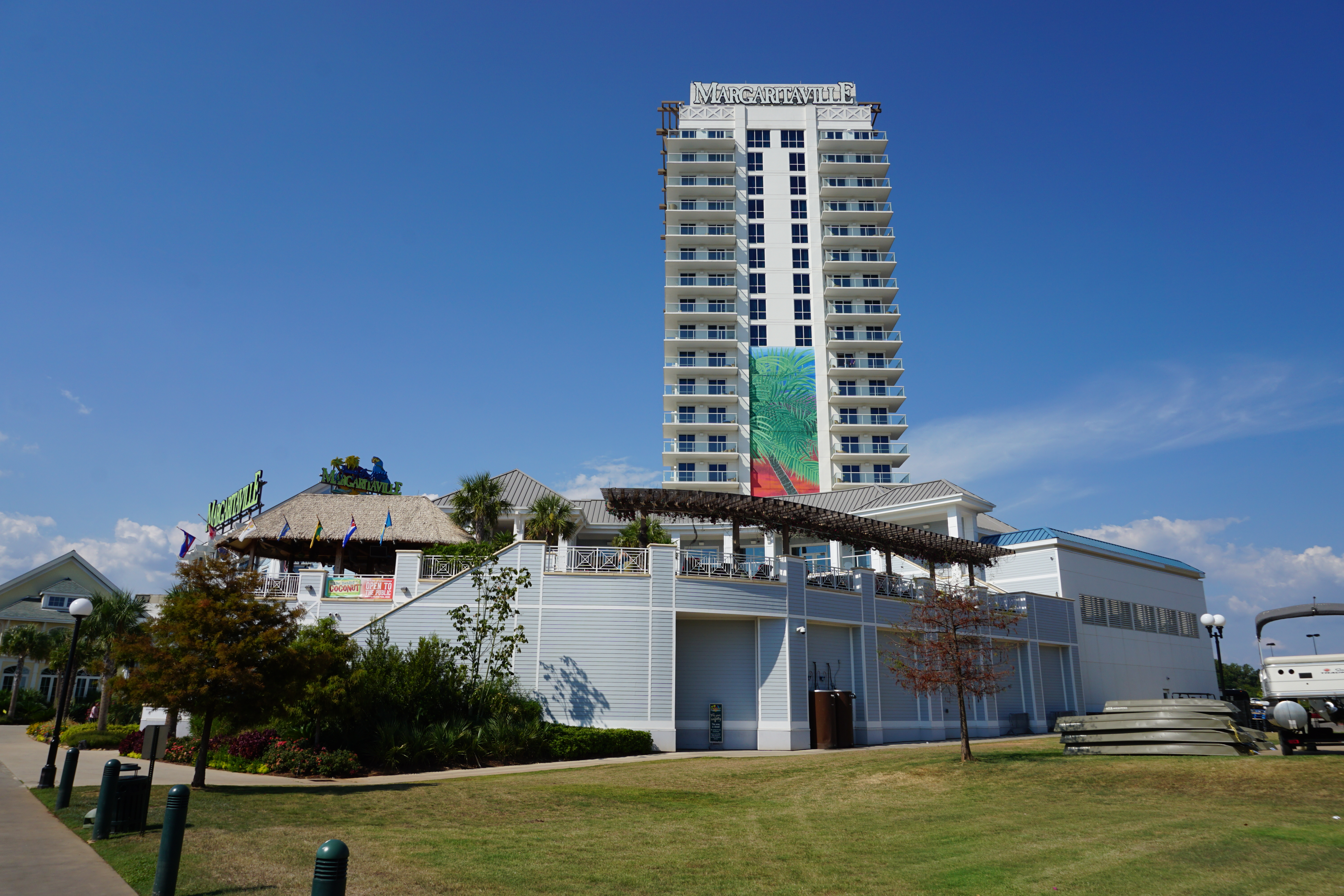
- The exterior of the casino hotel as seen in 2015.
- Interactive map of Margaritaville Resort Casino
- Location: Bossier City, Louisiana; 777 Margaritaville Way; 32.521237°N 93.743671°W
- Opened: June 13, 2013
- Gaming space: 26,500 square feet (2,460 m^{2})
- Casino type: Riverboat
- Owner: Vici Properties
- Operating license holder: Penn Entertainment
- Website: www.margaritavillebossiercity.com

Margaritaville Resort Casino is a casino hotel in Bossier City, Louisiana. It is owned by Vici Properties and operated by Penn Entertainment, and uses its name under license from Jimmy Buffett's Margaritaville.

The casino has 26,500 square feet (2,460 m^{2}) of gaming space with 1,200 slot machines and 50 table games. The hotel has 395 rooms in an 18-story tower.

== History ==
Plans for the casino were first revealed in June 2011, when Isle of Capri Casinos announced an option agreement to sell one of its two riverboats in Lake Charles, along with the accompanying casino license, to developers who planned to move the license to Bossier City as part of a $170-million resort project. The developers were Paul Alanis (owner of the Silver Slipper Casino in Mississippi) and William Trotter (former co-owner of Evangeline Downs racetrack and casino). Alanis gave more details about the planned resort later that month, including that it would be affiliated with Jimmy Buffett's Margaritaville brand.

Voters in Bossier Parish approved the casino in a November 2011 election. In February 2012, the developers completed their purchase of the Isle of Capri boat and license for $15 million, and construction began, with a Tutor Perini subsidiary as the general contractor. The casino was built as a barge floating in a pool with 2 feet (0.6 m) of water pumped in from the Red River, to comply with Louisiana's riverboat casino law. The project ultimately cost $205 million to develop.

The casino opened for a one-day preview event on June 13, 2013, and then opened permanently two days later.

=== Ownership History ===
In 2016, the Poarch Band of Creek Indians agreed to purchase the resort, which they planned to rename under their "Wind Creek" casino brand. The sale was canceled, however, because of a dispute between the owners and Margaritaville Holdings regarding payments for the Margaritaville name.

In 2019, Vici Properties bought the land and buildings for $261 million, while Penn National Gaming (now Penn Entertainment) purchased the property's operating business for $115 million and leased it from Vici for $23 million per year.
