= Jimmy Buffett's Margaritaville =

American hospitality company

Coordinates: 28.4616°N 81.4749°W

- Type: Holding company
- Industry: Hospitality
- Founded: January 3, 1985; 41 years ago in Key West, Florida, U.S.
- Founder: Jimmy Buffett
- Headquarters: Orlando, Florida, United States
- Number of locations: 23: Margaritaville; 1: JWB Prime Steak and Seafood; 7: 5 o'Clock Somewhere Bar & Grill
- Key people: Jonathan Cohlan
- Owner: Margaritaville Holdings LLC; International Meal Co.
- Website: www.margaritaville.com

Jimmy Buffett's Margaritaville is a United States–based hospitality company that manages and franchises a casual dining American restaurant chain, retail stores selling merchandise, and hotels themed after the musician Jimmy Buffett.

The brand is named after Buffett's hit song "Margaritaville", and is owned by Margaritaville Holdings LLC (a subsidiary of Cheeseburger Holding Company, LLC). There are locations in the United States, Canada, and Mexico, six island locations throughout the Caribbean as well as in Sydney, Australia, since September 2012.

Some locations are franchise-owned, such as the Caribbean, Australian, and Mexican locations. In 2014, a Brazilian company bought 12 Margaritaville restaurants and the rights to expand the company in the U.S.

== History ==
The earliest business venture named Margaritaville that was associated with singer Jimmy Buffett was the nightclub JB's Margaritaville, which opened in Gulf Shores, Alabama in 1984. While not officially affiliated with Buffett, the nightclub was owned by a friend of his. He agreed to perform at the nightclub once a year for the next three years. On January 3, 1985, Buffett opened his first Margaritaville retail store at Lands End Village in Key West, Florida. Initially a souvenir store featuring Buffett-themed merchandise, Margaritaville was co-owned by Buffett and local businessperson Sunshine Smith. By May 1986, the store had become an eatery. In 2002, he expanded his business ventures by partnering with Outback Steakhouse to develop the first Cheeseburger in Paradise restaurant in Southport, Indiana.

In late 2006, Buffett announced on the website that the Margaritaville cafes would no longer purchase or serve Canadian seafood products to protest Canada's treatment of seals.

On May 15, 2007, Harrah's Entertainment, now Caesars Entertainment Corp. announced plans to build the $700 million Margaritaville Casino Resort in Biloxi, Mississippi on the site of the former Grand Casino Biloxi and Casino Magic Biloxi properties. Due to the U.S. recession, however, construction of the casino ceased on June 10, 2008.

On January 12, 2011, following the announcement of the new partnership between MVB Holdings and the Brosig, Sekul, and Sims families, for the differently planned Biloxi, Mississippi, casino, John Payne, Caesars Entertainment Corp. central division president, stated, "We are disappointed that our project with Margaritaville will not proceed." This casino eventually opened in May 2012, then closed a few years later in September 2014. A Margaritaville resort opened on Highway 90 at the location of the old Grand Casino. This new resort does not have a casino.

In 2018, Margaritaville became one of the two primary sponsors of the Minto U.S. Open Pickleball Championships Powered by Margaritaville held in Naples, Florida. The U.S. Open has since become the largest annual pickleball event in the world, with over 50,000 spectators in 2024.

== Locations ==
=== Margaritaville ===
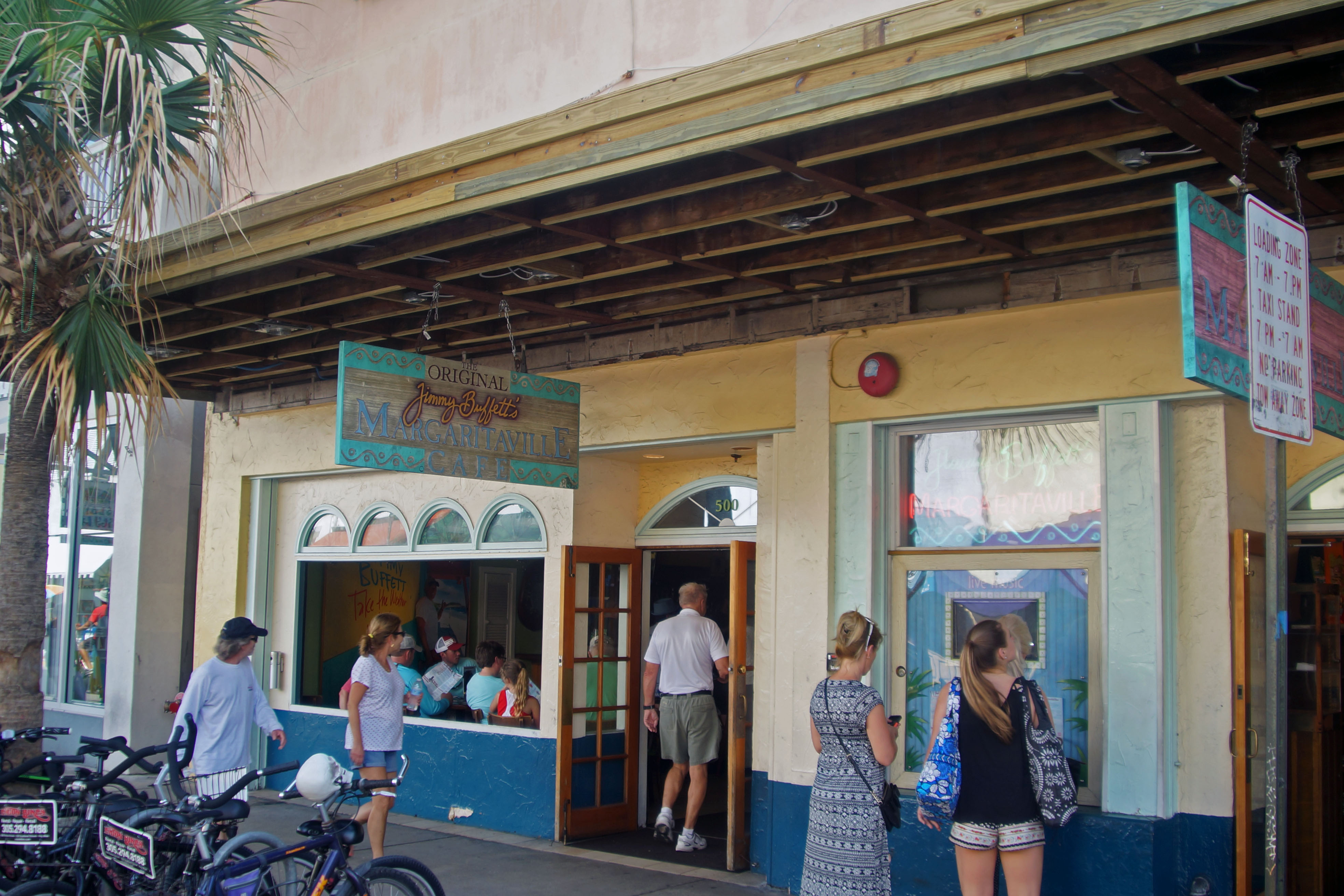
Jimmy Buffett's Margaritaville in Key West, Florida

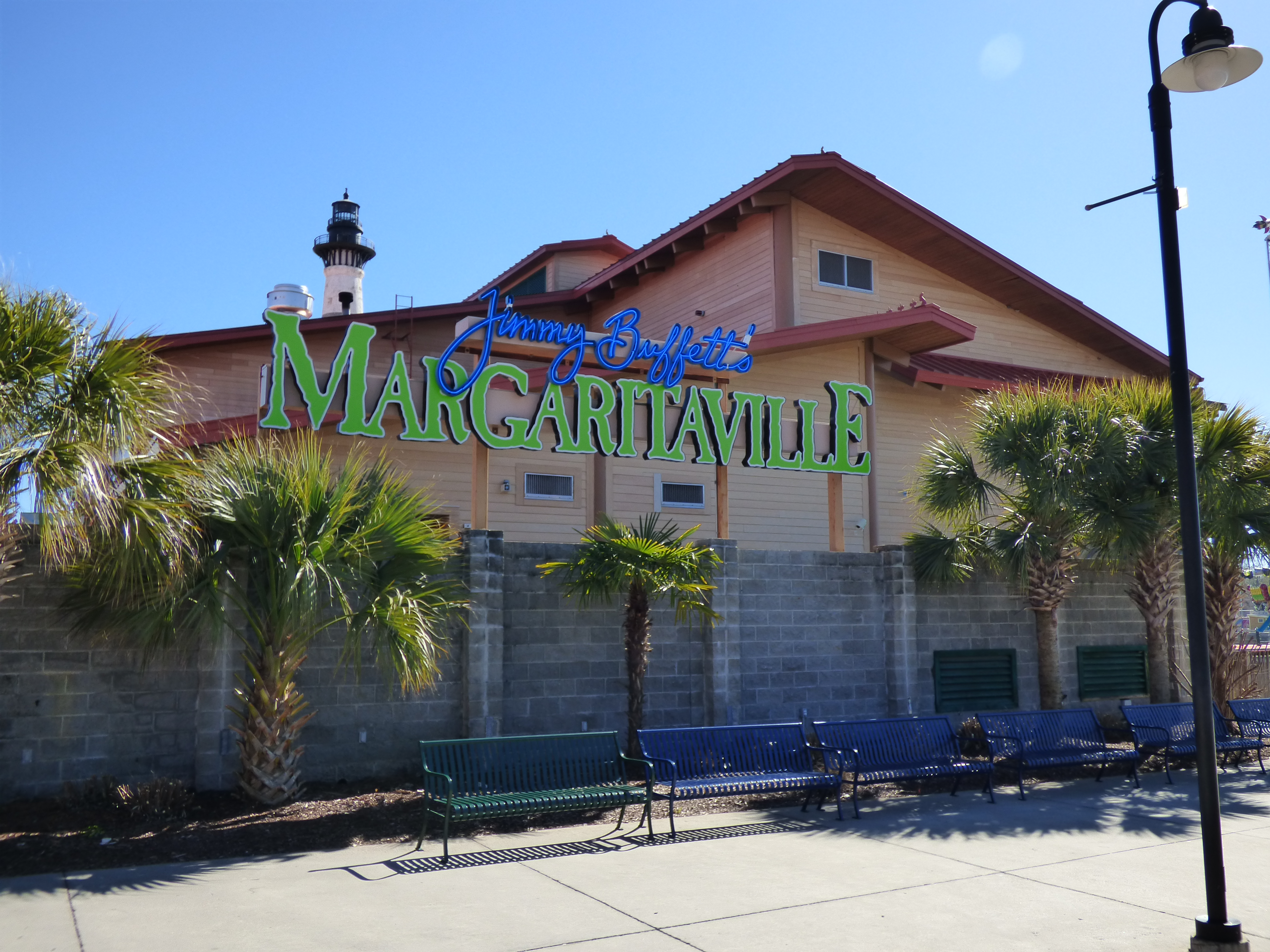
Margaritaville Myrtle Beach, South Carolina

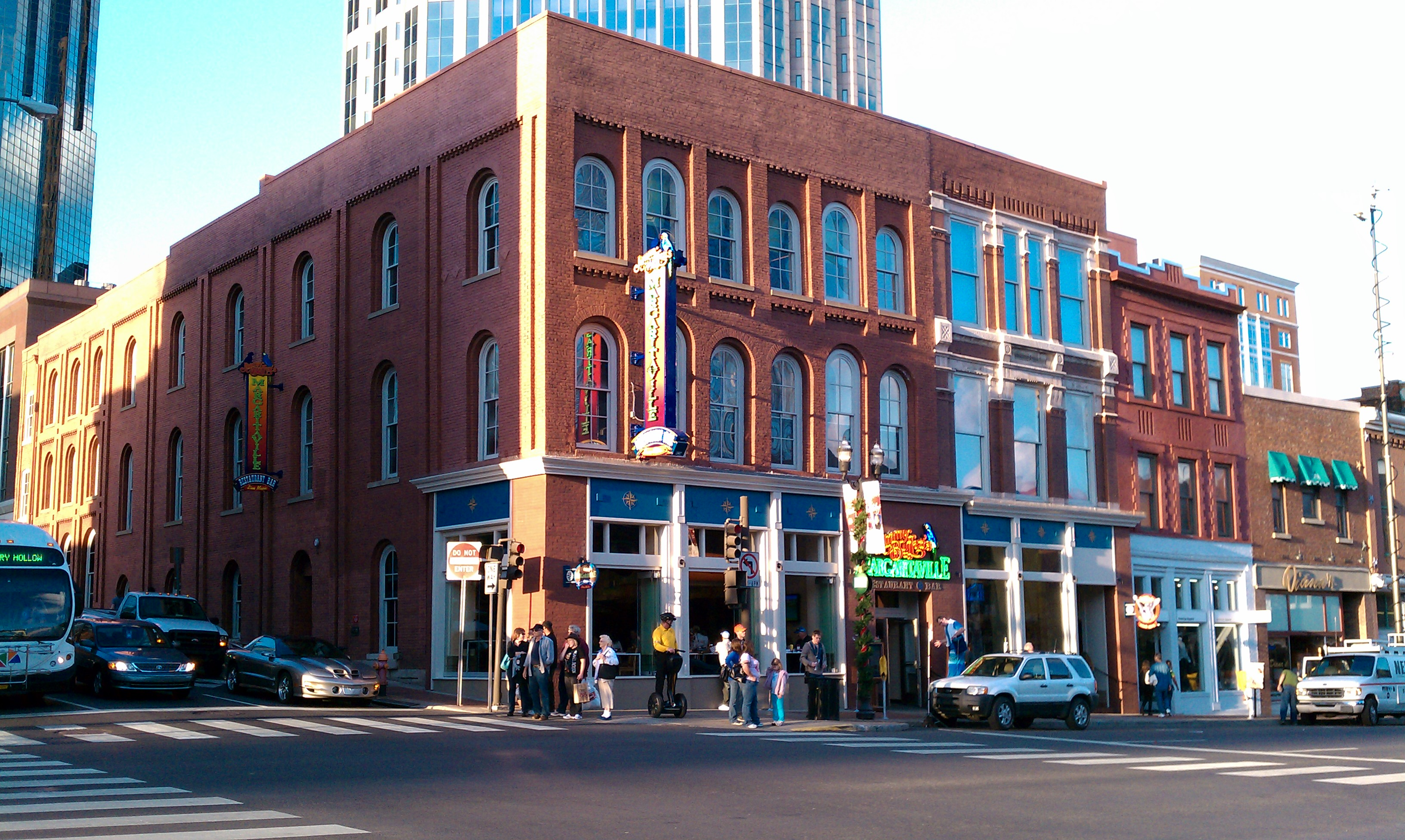
Margaritaville Nashville, Tennessee

Dockside at Margaritaville in Cozumel at sunset

- Atlanta, Georgia
- Atlantic City, New Jersey
- Biloxi, Mississippi (Margaritaville Resort Biloxi)
- Bloomington, Minnesota (inside Mall of America)
- Boston, Massachusetts
- Hyannis, Massachusetts (formerly the Cape Codder Resort and Waterpark)
- Chicago, Illinois (part of Navy Pier)
- Cleveland, Ohio (The Flats)
- Conroe, Texas
- Cozumel, Mexico
- Destin, Florida
- Falmouth, Jamaica
- Fort Myers Beach, Florida
- Grand Cayman, Cayman Islands
- Grand Turk, Turks and Caicos Islands
- Hollywood, California (part of Universal CityWalk Hollywood)
- Hollywood, Florida
- Jacksonville Beach, Florida
- Key West, Florida
- Las Vegas, Nevada (defunct, formerly at Flamingo Las Vegas)
- Montego Bay, Jamaica
- Myrtle Beach, South Carolina (part of Broadway at the Beach)
- Nassau, Bahamas - Margaritaville Beach Resort and One Particular Harbour
- Nashville, Tennessee
- Negril, Jamaica
- New York City (Times Square)
- Niagara Falls, Ontario
- Ocho Rios, Jamaica
- Orlando, Florida (part of Universal CityWalk Orlando)
- Osage Beach, Missouri
- Palm Springs, California
- Panama City Beach, Florida
- Paradise Island, Bahamas
- Pigeon Forge, Tennessee
- San Antonio, Texas
- Tulsa, Oklahoma (Margaritaville Casino & Restaurant Tulsa, part of River Spirit Casino)
- South Padre Island, Texas

=== LandShark Bar & Grill ===
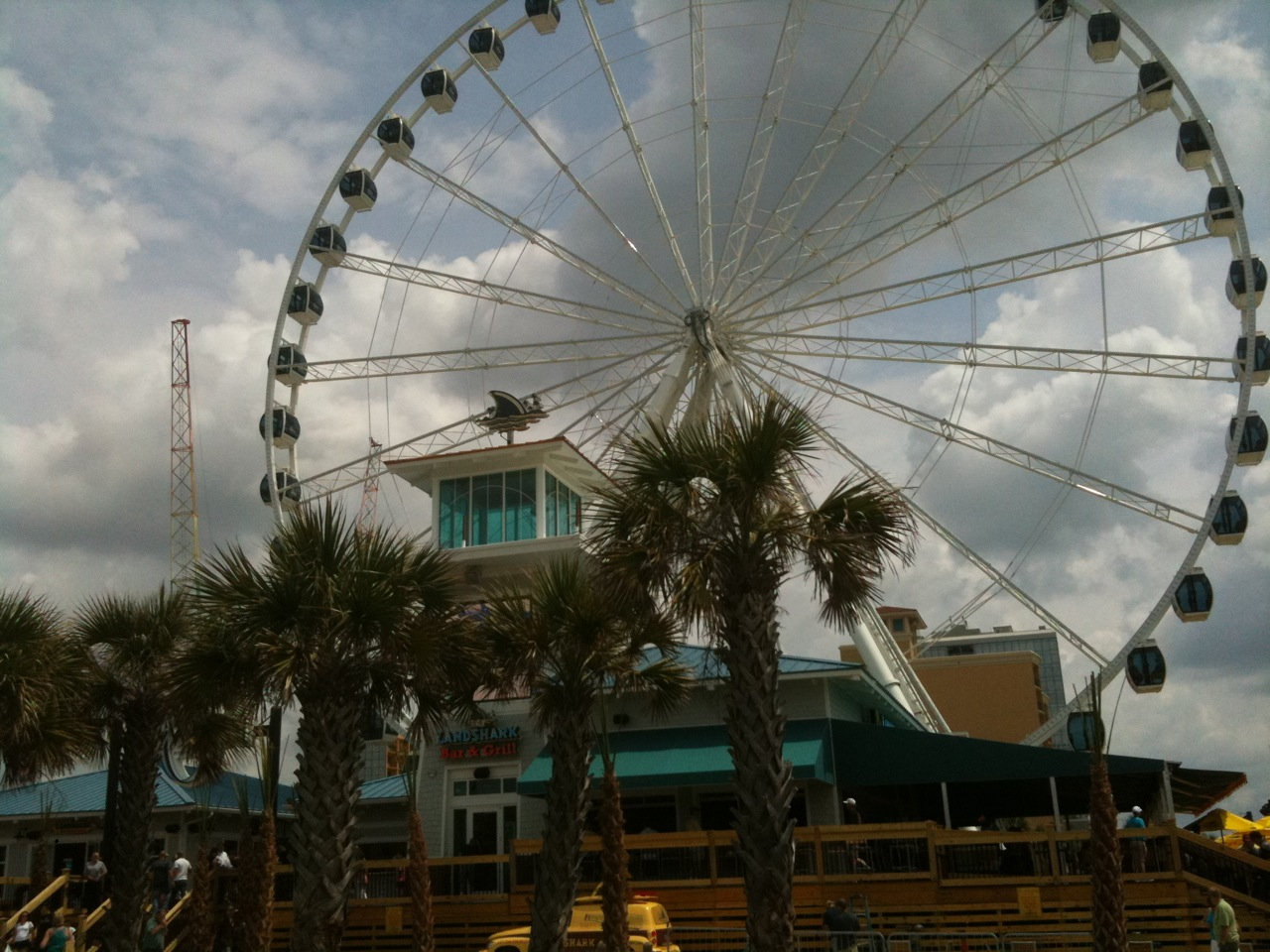
Landshark Bar & Grill Myrtle Beach

- Atlantic City, New Jersey
- Branson, Missouri
- Buford, Georgia
- Conroe, Texas
- Daytona Beach, Florida
- Harvest Caye, Belize
- Hollywood, Florida
- Myrtle Beach, South Carolina
- New York City (Times Square)
- North Myrtle Beach, South Carolina
- Sweetwater, Miami-Dade County, Florida
- Miami, Florida (underneath the former Hard Rock Cafe at Bayside Marketplace)
- San Antonio, Texas
- South Lake Tahoe, California
- Vicksburg, Mississippi
- Pensacola Beach, Florida
- Pereybere, Mauritius
- Osage Beach, Missouri

=== Air Margaritaville ===
Airport Lounge Restaurants

- Detroit Metropolitan Airport
- Cancún International Airport
- São Paulo/Guarulhos International Airport
- Miami International Airport
- Tocumen International Airport
- Sangster International Airport
- Fort Lauderdale–Hollywood International Airport
- San Juan International Airport

=== Retail outlets ===
As of February 2020, United States retail store locations are in Key West; New Orleans; Orlando; Las Vegas; Myrtle Beach; Glendale (state not listed); Panama City Beach, Florida; Mohegan Sun; Honolulu; Pensacola Beach; Nashville; and Chicago. The newest concept, a "Landshark Surfshack Retail Shop", opened May 17, 2011, at the Myrtle Beach SkyWheel attraction. Mexico's retail locations are in Cancún and Cozumel. Canada's retail location is in Niagara Falls, Ontario.

Caribbean retail locations in the British West Indies are in Montego Bay (including two "Air Margaritaville" locations at Sangster International Airport), Negril and Ocho Rios on the island of Jamaica; Grand Turk in the Turks and Caicos Islands; and George Town, Grand Cayman in the Cayman Islands.

=== Vacation Clubs ===
In St. Thomas, Virgin Islands, and Rio Grande, Puerto Rico, are vacation clubs operated by Margaritaville.

=== Hotels ===
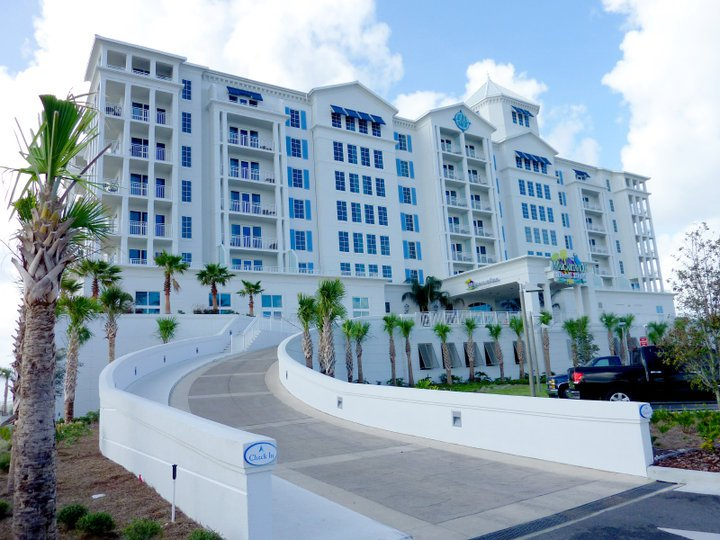
Margaritaville Beach Hotel on Pensacola Beach, FL

On June 28, 2010, the Margaritaville Beach Hotel (pictured to the right) opened on Pensacola Beach. The former site of a Holiday Inn, destroyed by Hurricane Ivan on September 16, 2004, Margaritaville Hotel is on over 800 feet of gulf-front property. An additional 800 feet overlooks the bay. The beachfront hotel features 'barefoot elegance' with 162 guest rooms, including 24 corner rooms with wrap-around balconies.

Future phased plans include an adjacent free-standing Margaritaville Cafe restaurant and a bayside waterpark.

Plans for a second and third Margaritaville Beach Hotel were announced in 2010. The second, still in the planning stages, would be located in Myrtle Beach.

The 349-room Margaritaville Hollywood Beach Resort opened in 2015 in Hollywood, Florida.

In early 2016, Margaritaville Resort Biloxi in South Mississippi opened. The building was the Casino Magic, which Hurricane Katrina destroyed. Margaritaville Biloxi has a 55,000 sq. ft. arcade with over 200 games for kids and adults. Along with 271 hotel rooms, Margaritaville in Biloxi has a 450-foot lazy river, lounge pool, water slides, water ropes course, and a swimup bar.

The Margaritaville Island Hotel opened in Pigeon Forge, Tennessee in 2015, followed by the Margaritaville Island Inn in 2017. The Margaritaville Resort opened in Gatlinburg, Tennessee, in 2018.

Margaritaville Lake of the Ozarks opened in the Spring of 2019 and offers a wide variety of bars, restaurants, water activities, golf, etc.- all right on the Lake. It has a large outdoor pool, tiki bar, marina, an indoor waterpark, and even horseback riding.

In late 2020, Margaritaville Resort Palm Springs opened in California, becoming the first location on the West Coast. An additional location has since opened in South Lake Tahoe, California.

In spring 2021, Margaritaville Resort Times Square, New York, opened. The resort is the northernmost resort in the chain, and it opened alongside five restaurants. It features a Tropical NYC atmosphere and a 50-foot replica of the Statue of Liberty holding a Margarita. The resort also features New York's only year-round outdoor pool on one of its decks.

In April 2023, Newport, Kentucky's Board of Commissioners, revealed that a new Margaritaville Resort Project has officially gotten the go-ahead from Newport City Commissioners. Plans now call for the resort, which includes 264 hotel rooms, three restaurants, and a rooftop pool, to be built and opened to guests in 2026. Shortly afterwards in June 2023, Margaritaville opened a location in South Padre Island, Texas.

Margaritaville opened its first adults-only all-inclusive resort in Riviera Maya in June 2023.

In June 2025, Margaritaville Hotel Kansas City opened located in the Legends Outlets in Kansas City, Kansas. It was built on the previous location of Schlitterbahn Kansas City.

=== Casinos ===
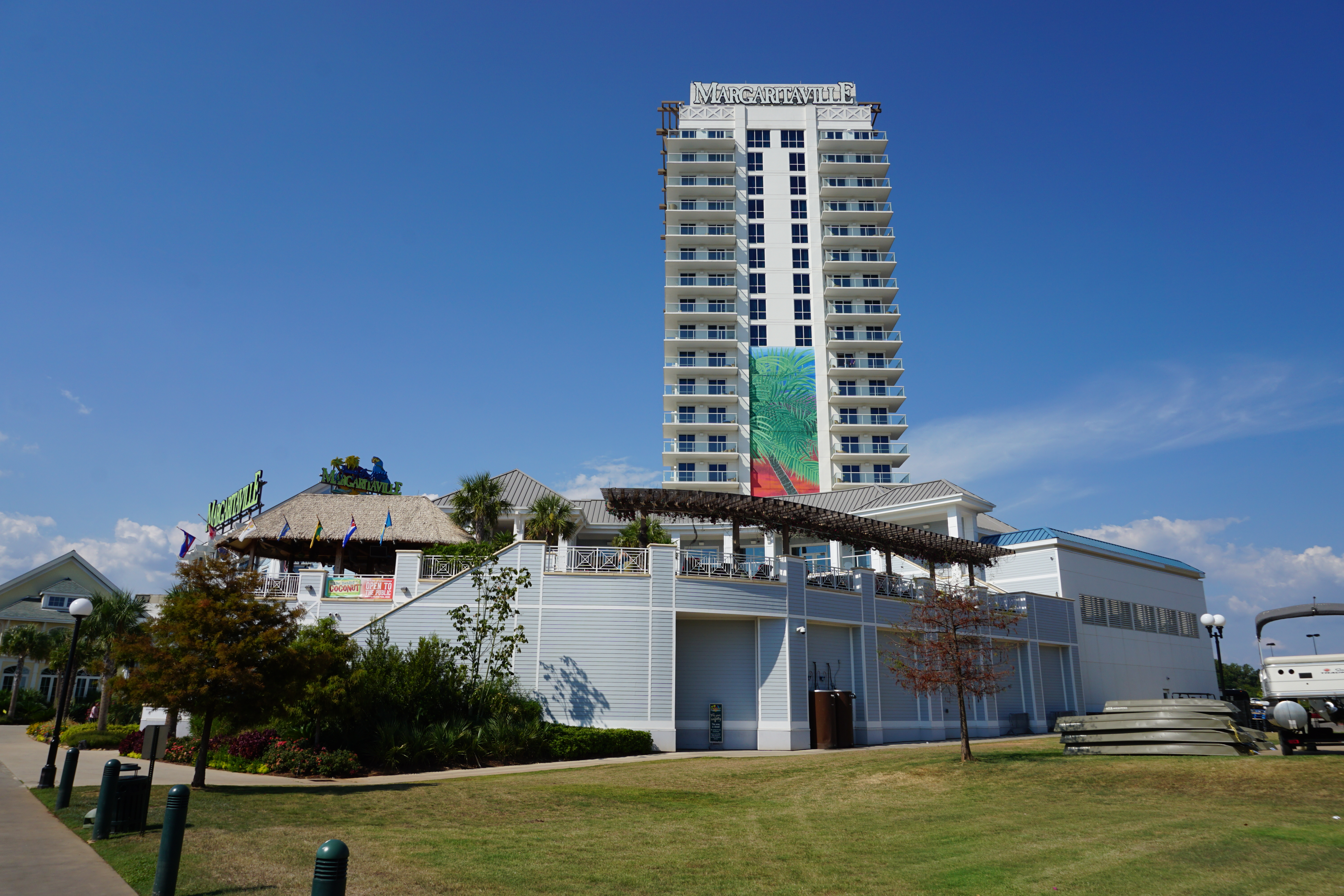
Margaritaville Resort Casino in Bossier City, Louisiana

In 2011, the Las Vegas Margaritaville at Flamingo Las Vegas expanded to include a 15,000 sq ft (1,400 m^{2}) Margaritaville-branded casino. The casino opened October 1, 2011, operating until 2018. The restaurant closed on May 30, 2024.

On June 22, 2011, Paradise Casino LLC unveiled plans for the Margaritaville Resort Casino to be built in Bossier City, Louisiana. The complex, a $170 million, 400-room resort, would include an 18-story hotel tower, a 1,000-seat entertainment complex with a VIP balcony, and an outdoor tropical area visible to the north from the Louisiana Boardwalk.

In March 2013, the Muscogee (Creek) Nation announced that its River Spirit Casino on the Arkansas River in Tulsa, Oklahoma would add a Margaritaville Casino as part of a $250 million project that would also add a 22-story, 500-room luxury tower to the existing facility.

=== Latitude Margaritaville Daytona Beach ===
Latitude Margaritaville is a $1 billion retirement village in Daytona Beach, Florida. The project is a joint venture between Minto Communities and Buffett's Margaritaville Holdings, with the development being built on land close to LPGA Boulevard and about a mile to the west from Interstate-95.

Phase one of the community will have 400 homes with a potential of 6,900 homes once the project is completed. As of March 2018, 250 lots have been sold with prices between the low $200,000s to the mid $300,000s. The community will have a pet salon, grocery store, and a private beach when it opens in April 2018.

Since opening in Daytona, two other locations have been announced: Latitude Margaritaville Hilton Head, South Carolina, and Latitude Margaritaville Watersound, Florida. Hilton Head offers a wide range of home designs and floor plans. Amenities will include a resort-style pool, fitness center, social hall, game and hobby rooms, arts and learning programs, indoor and outdoor dining with signature Margaritaville food and beverage concepts, tennis and pickleball courts, and a 290,000-square-foot Margaritaville retail center. Phase one is currently underway with 203 home sites. Current plans call for 3,000+ homes once the community is complete.

Latitude Margaritaville Watersound broke ground in 2019 and will be the third of the communities to be developed.

=== Cruises ===
On December 8, 2021, it was announced that a partnership was reached with Bahamas Paradise Cruise Line and Margaritaville. The cruise line was rebranded as Margaritaville at Sea, and the line's sole ship, the Grand Classica was renamed as Margaritaville at Sea Paradise following a multimillion-dollar refit in 2022. Many of the ship's interiors and venues were rebranded to match the Margaritaville brand and décor. It currently operates 3 day/2 night cruises from the Port of Palm Beach to Grand Bahama Island.

== In popular culture ==
Margaritaville is featured in the 2015 film Jurassic World as one of the restaurants in the fictional theme park, with Buffett himself making a cameo appearance as one of the guests running away from the Pteranodon attack, carrying a pair of margaritas.

In 2023, YouTube content creators Eddy Burback and Ted Nivison took a road trip to visit and eat at every single Margaritaville in the United States and Canada, chronicling their journeys in two separate videos, similar to their adventure the previous year visiting every Rainforest Cafe in North America.

== See also ==
- Cheeseburger in Paradise, defunct theme restaurant chain
- "Margaritaville", the song for which the brand is named
- "Margaritaville", South Park episode in which a personal Jimmy Buffett's Margaritaville margarita maker plays a prominent role
