= List of casinos in Mississippi =

Casino Boat on the Mississippi River

This is a list of casinos in Mississippi.

== List of casinos ==
List of casinos in the U.S. state of Mississippi
Casino	City	County	State	District	Type	Comments
Ameristar Casino Vicksburg	Vicksburg	Warren	Mississippi	Lower River Region
Bally's Vicksburg	Vicksburg	Warren	Mississippi	Lower River Region		Formerly Rainbow Casino, Lady Luck Casino Vicksburg, and Casino Vicksburg
Bayou Caddy's Jubilee Casino	Greenville	Washington	Mississippi	Lower River Region		Closed 2012, merged into Trop Casino Greenville
Beau Rivage	Biloxi	Harrison	Mississippi	Gulf Coast
Biloxi Boardwalk Resort	Biloxi	Harrison	Mississippi	Gulf Coast		Postposed new 37-acres resort includes 500-room hotel, casino, sand beach pool, lazy river, waterslides, and a restaurant on a raised pier
Bok Homa Casino	Sandersville	Jones	Mississippi		Native American
Boomtown Biloxi	Biloxi	Harrison	Mississippi	Gulf Coast		Postposed New Hotel on the same property
Casino Magic Biloxi	Biloxi	Harrison	Mississippi	Gulf Coast		Closed 2005
Copa Casino	Gulfport	Harrison	Mississippi	Gulf Coast		Closed 2005. Replaced by Island View Casino
1st Jackpot Casino Tunica	Tunica Resorts	Tunica	Mississippi	Upper River Region		Formerly Bally's; hotel now closed, casino still in operation
Eastside Cannery Biloxi	Biloxi	Harrison	Mississippi	Gulf Coast		Planned hotel casino located on North corner of Back Bay & Holley Intersection, 300 room tower located on the bay, new location planning after demolish in Vegas
Fitz Tunica Casino & Hotel	Tunica Resorts	Tunica	Mississippi	Upper River Region
Foxwoods Resort Casino	Biloxi	Harrison	Mississippi	Gulf Coast		Planned opening is unknown, located northwest of Back Bay & Oak intersection
Gold Strike Tunica	Tunica Resorts	Tunica	Mississippi	Upper River Region
Golden Moon Casino	Choctaw	Neshoba	Mississippi		Native American	Part of the Pearl River Resort
Golden Nugget Biloxi	Biloxi	Harrison	Mississippi	Gulf Coast
Grand Station Casino	Vicksburg	Warren	Mississippi	Lower River Region		Closed 2012
Hard Rock Hotel & Casino Biloxi	Biloxi	Harrison	Mississippi	Gulf Coast
Harlow's Casino	Greenville	Washington	Mississippi	Lower River Region
Harrah's Casino Tunica	Tunica Resorts	Tunica	Mississippi	Upper River Region		Formerly Grand Casino Tunica; closed 2014
Harrah's Gulf Coast	Biloxi	Harrison	Mississippi	Gulf Coast
Hollywood Casino Gulf Coast	Bay St. Louis	Hancock	Mississippi	Gulf Coast		Formerly Casino Magic
Hollywood Casino Tunica	Tunica Resorts	Tunica	Mississippi	Upper River Region
Horseshoe Casino Tunica	Tunica Resorts	Tunica	Mississippi	Upper River Region
IP Casino Resort Spa	Biloxi	Harrison	Mississippi	Gulf Coast
Island View Casino	Gulfport	Harrison	Mississippi	Gulf Coast
Isle of Capri Casino Hotel Lula	Lula	Coahoma	Mississippi	Upper River Region
Isle of Capri Casino Hotel Natchez	Natchez	Adams	Mississippi	Lower River Region		Closed 2015
Magnolia Bluffs Casino	Natchez	Adams	Mississippi	Lower River Region
Margaritaville Casino and Restaurant	Biloxi	Harrison	Mississippi	Gulf Coast		Closed 2014
Palace Casino Biloxi	Biloxi	Harrison	Mississippi	Gulf Coast
President Casino Broadwater Resort	Biloxi	Harrison	Mississippi	Gulf Coast		Closed 2005
Resorts Casino Tunica	Tunica Resorts	Tunica	Mississippi	Upper River Region		Closed 2019
Riverwalk Casino and Hotel	Vicksburg	Warren	Mississippi	Lower River Region
Sam's Town Hotel and Gambling Hall, Tunica	Tunica Resorts	Tunica	Mississippi	Upper River Region		Closed in November 2025
Scarlet Pearl Casino	D'Iberville	Harrison	Mississippi	Gulf Coast
Silver Slipper Casino	Lakeshore	Hancock	Mississippi	Gulf Coast
Silver Star Casino	Choctaw	Neshoba	Mississippi		Native American	Part of the Pearl River Resort
Rock and Brews casino	Biloxi	Harrison	Mississippi	Gulf Coast		Located on 5th St Biloxi, an KISS themed hotel casino, Initial plans for the 40,000 square foot casino include a 3,000 seat concert venue, a world tour food hall and a 300-room hotel.
RW Casino Resort	Biloxi	Harrison	Mississippi	Gulf Coast		Future Casino Resort located at the US 90 & Veterans Ave
Tivoli Resort & Casino	Biloxi	Harrison	Mississippi	Gulf Coast		Future Casino Resort rendering shows plans for Biloxi Capital’s proposed casino resort at the Tivoli site in East Biloxi. Among the amenities would be 1,300 hotel rooms, convention space and 2,000 slot machines. City of Biloxi
Treasure Bay Casino Biloxi	Biloxi	Harrison	Mississippi	Gulf Coast
Tullis Gardens Biloxi	Biloxi	Harrison	Mississippi	Gulf Coast		Planned New Hotel & Casino
Trop Casino Greenville	Greenville	Washington	Mississippi	Lower River Region		Formerly Lighthouse Point Casino
Tunica Roadhouse Casino & Hotel	Tunica Resorts	Tunica	Mississippi	Upper River Region		Formerly Sheraton Casino and Hotel Tunica; casino floor closed 2019, hotel closed 2020
Wind Creek D'Iberville	D'Iberville	Harrison	Mississippi	Gulf Coast		Located on the West of I-110 Interstate, features 300+ rooms, casino floor, shopping & dining, and more
UMUSIC Broadwater Hotel	Biloxi	Harrison	Mississippi	Gulf Coast		Planned new live entertainment resort, Features: The resort is planned to include a luxury hotel, a large music venue, a casino, a water park, and retail space. Partnership: A joint venture between Universal Music Group, Dakia U-Ventures, and Pyramid Hotel Group. Brand: The project is part of the UMUSIC Hotels brand, which aims to integrate music-based experiences into the local culture. Universal Music Group
WaterView Casino & Hotel	Vicksburg	Warren	Mississippi	Lower River Region		Formerly Isle of Capri and DiamondJacks

== Gallery ==
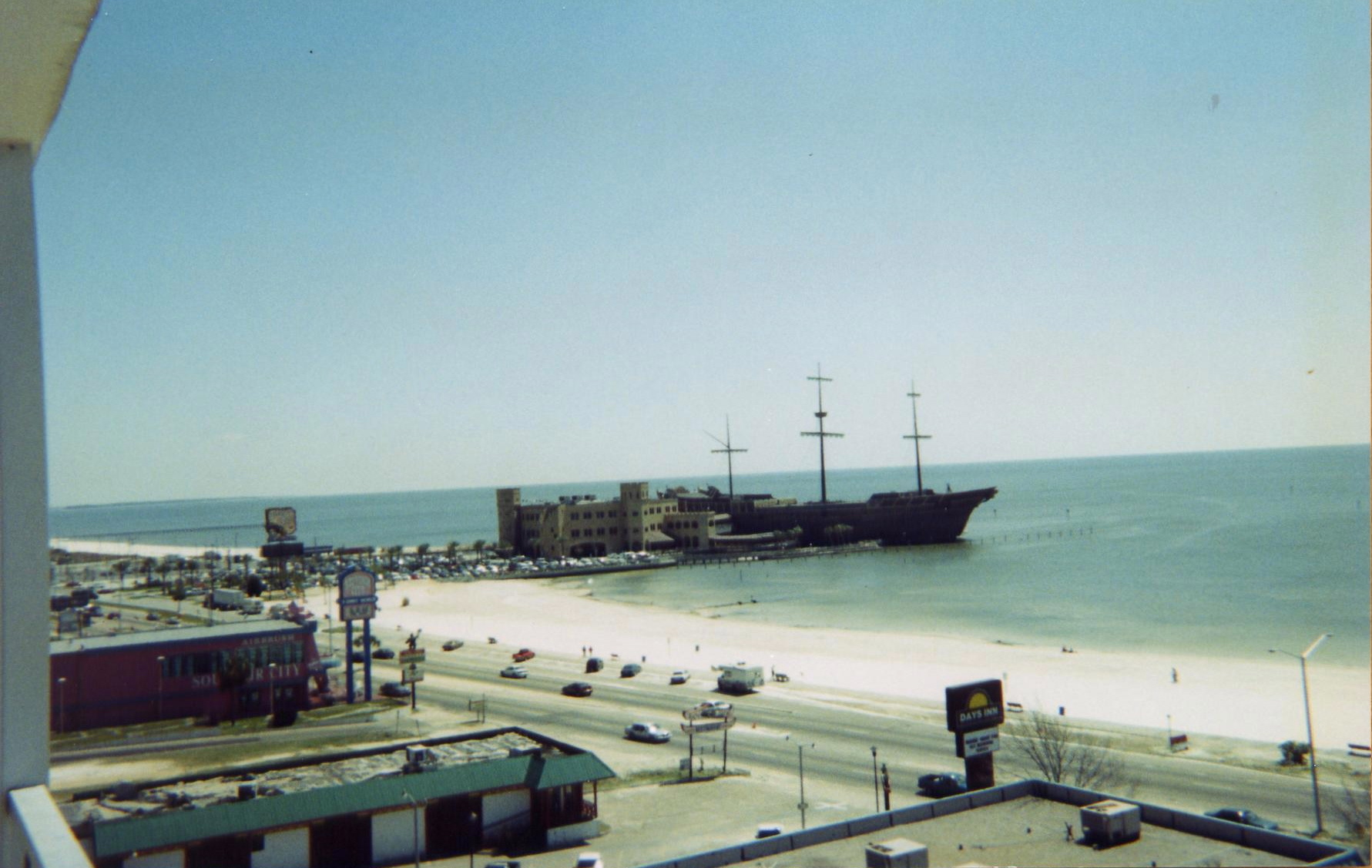
Treasure Bay Casino in the 1990s, before Hurricane Katrina

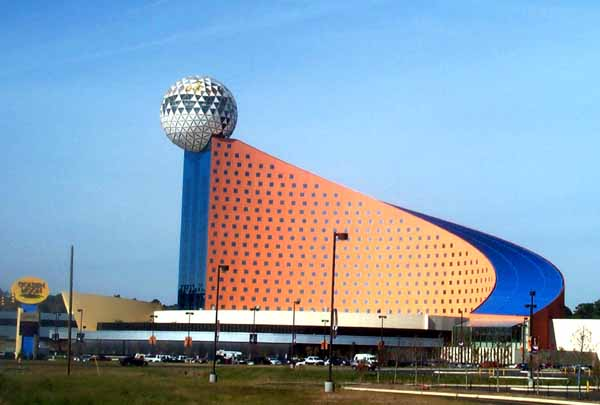
Golden Moon Casino

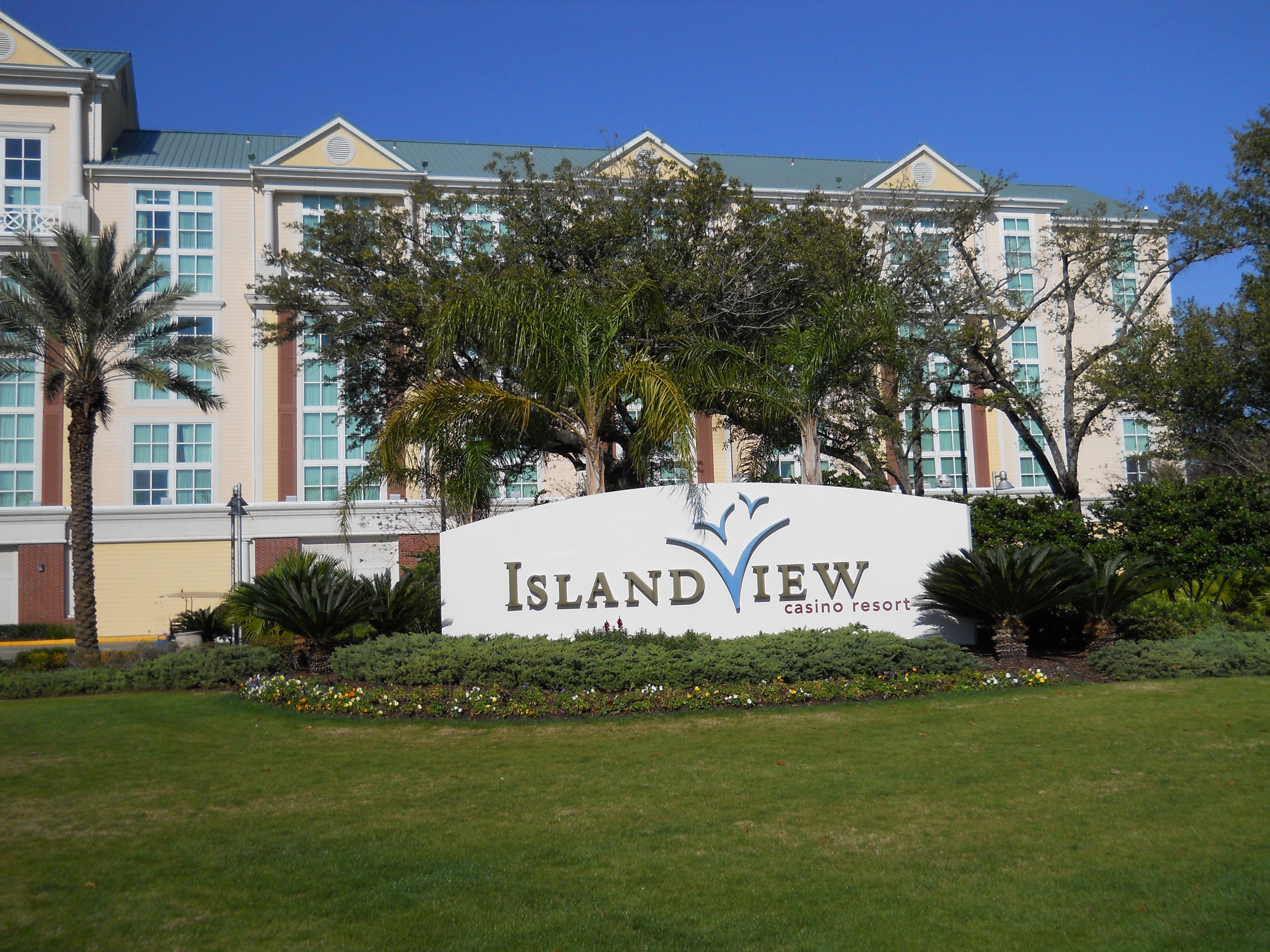
Island View Casino

== See also ==
- List of casinos in the United States
- List of casino hotels
