= SS Rijndam =

SS Rijndam, also spelt Ryndam, may refer to:

- USS Rijndam (ID-2505), a Holland America Line passenger liner that was built in 1901 and scrapped in 1929. She was a United States Navy transport in World War I.
- SS Ryndam (1950) aka Rijndam was an ocean liner built for Holland America Line, launched in 1950, renamed Pride of Mississippi, then Pride of Galveston, and sunk in 2003.
