= Harrah's Gulf Coast =

Casino and hotel in Biloxi, Mississippi

Coordinates: 30.393015°N 88.865866°W

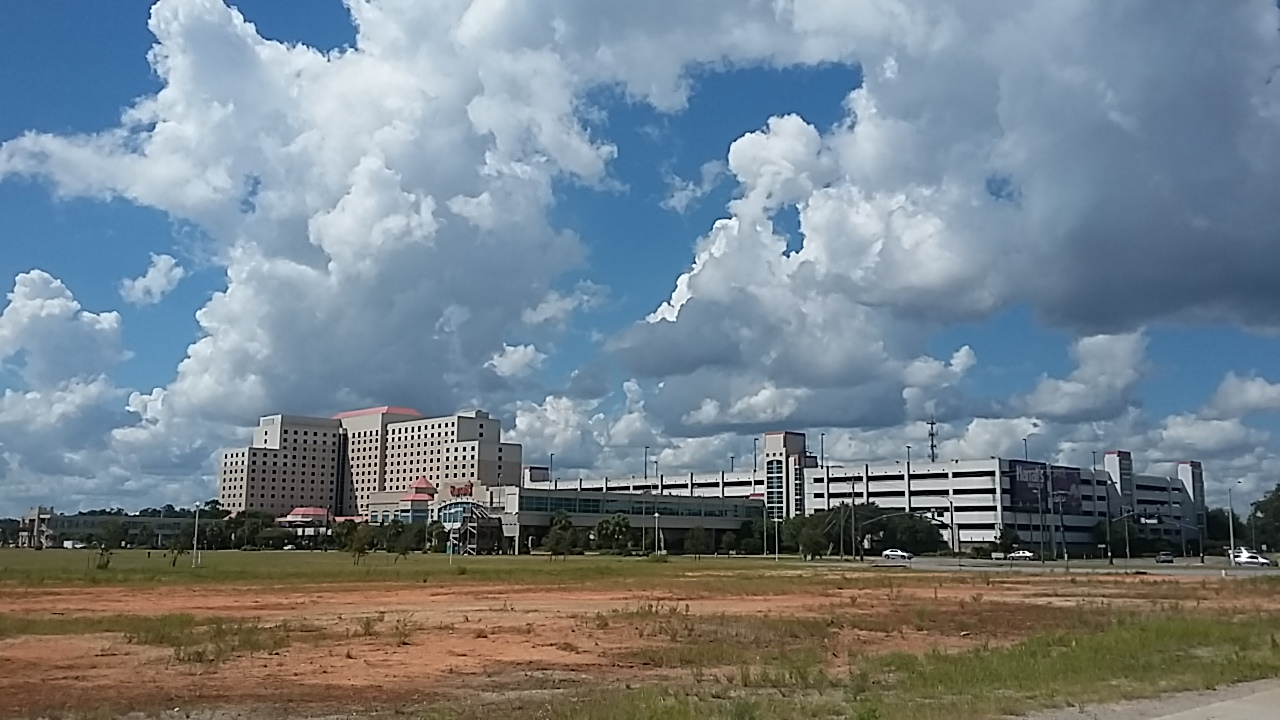
- Interactive map of Harrah's Gulf Coast
- Location: Biloxi, Mississippi; 265 Beach Boulevard
- Opened: January 21, 1994
- No. of rooms: 499
- Gaming space: 35,000 sq ft (3,300 m^{2})
- Notable restaurants: LB's Steakhouse
- Casino type: Land-based
- Owner: Vici Properties
- Operating license holder: Caesars Entertainment
- Previous names: Grand Casino Biloxi
- Website: caesars.com/harrahsgulfcoast

Harrah's Gulf Coast is a casino and hotel in Biloxi, Mississippi, owned by Vici Properties and operated by Caesars Entertainment.

This facility replaces the former Grand Casino Biloxi, which was destroyed by Hurricane Katrina. At the time, the casino offered a 106,000-square-foot (9,800 m^{2}) casino, two hotels with 975 rooms, and a 42,000-square-foot (3,900 m^{2}) convention center.

Currently, the casino features around 800 slot machines and 35 table games.

== History ==
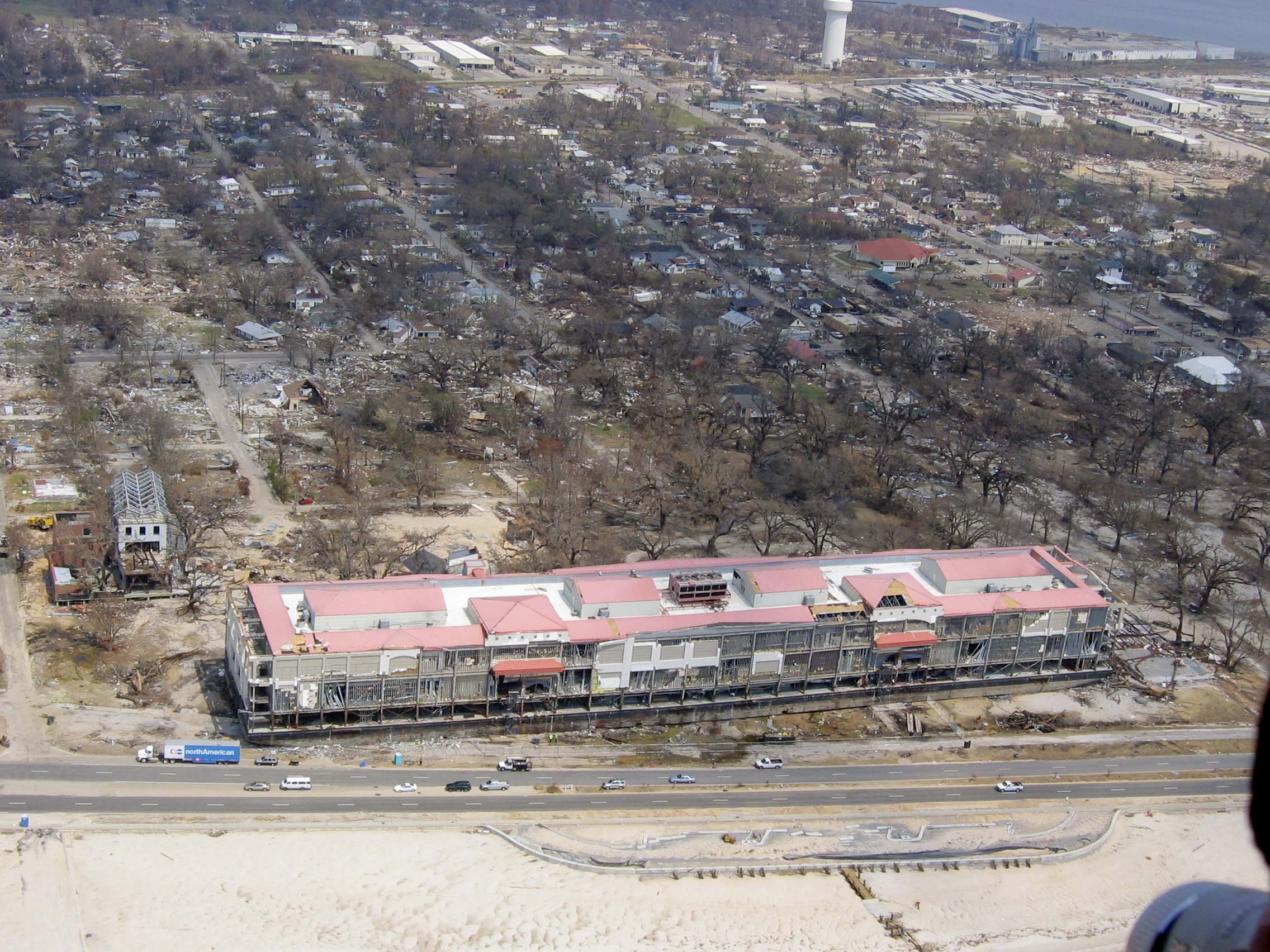
After Katrina: Grand Casino Biloxi barge washed inland

Prior to 2005, this casino was a Grand Casinos and Park Place Entertainment property. After the ownership change to Harrah's Entertainment it was announced that this casino was being converted to the Horseshoe brand. But these plans were put on hold when Biloxi and the Gulf Coast were hit by Hurricane Katrina. The storm destroyed the barge on which the casino floor was located; the storm surge swept the barge from the shoreline all the way across Beach Boulevard, nearly 500 feet (150 m) inward. On May 21, 2006, demolition crews imploded the beach-side hotel structure, leaving Harrah's with a clean slate for rebuilding.

After Katrina, the company announced that they will be re-opening the facility during Summer 2006, with a 35,000 sq ft (3,300 m^{2}) casino, a spa, and other amenities, but the facilities south of Highway 90 would take several years to complete. On August 17, 2006, the first phase of the rebuilding opened with a 495-room hotel and a new land-based casino.

The long-term plan for this property had been to construct what Harrah's (now renamed back to Caesars) called "a destination resort." Part of the expansion plans revolved around Caesars' purchase of the 18 acres (73,000 m^{2}) that comprised the neighboring Casino Magic property. In May 2007, Harrah's announced the Margaritaville Casino and Resort would be built on the site.

However, construction of that expansion ceased in 2008 due to economic concerns, and in January 2011, Caesars officials announced the termination of the agreement with Jimmy Buffett and his Margaritaville brand. A new Margaritaville Casino and Restaurant, not affiliated with Caesars Entertainment, was to be constructed at a different location in Biloxi.

In October 2017, ownership of the property was transferred to Vici Properties as part of a corporate spin-off, and it was leased back to Caesars Entertainment.

During the pandemic, Ceasars Entertainment did away with all the buffets in its casino resorts and adopted the policy not to bring them back. The former buffet in the Harrah was changed into a food court that offers seafood, Cajun food, Asian food, desserts, among others.

== See also ==
- List of Caesars Entertainment properties
- List of casinos in Mississippi
