= Ahern Hotel =

Hotel in Las Vegas, Nevada, U.S.

Ahern Luxury Boutique Hotel
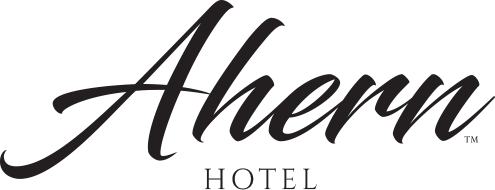

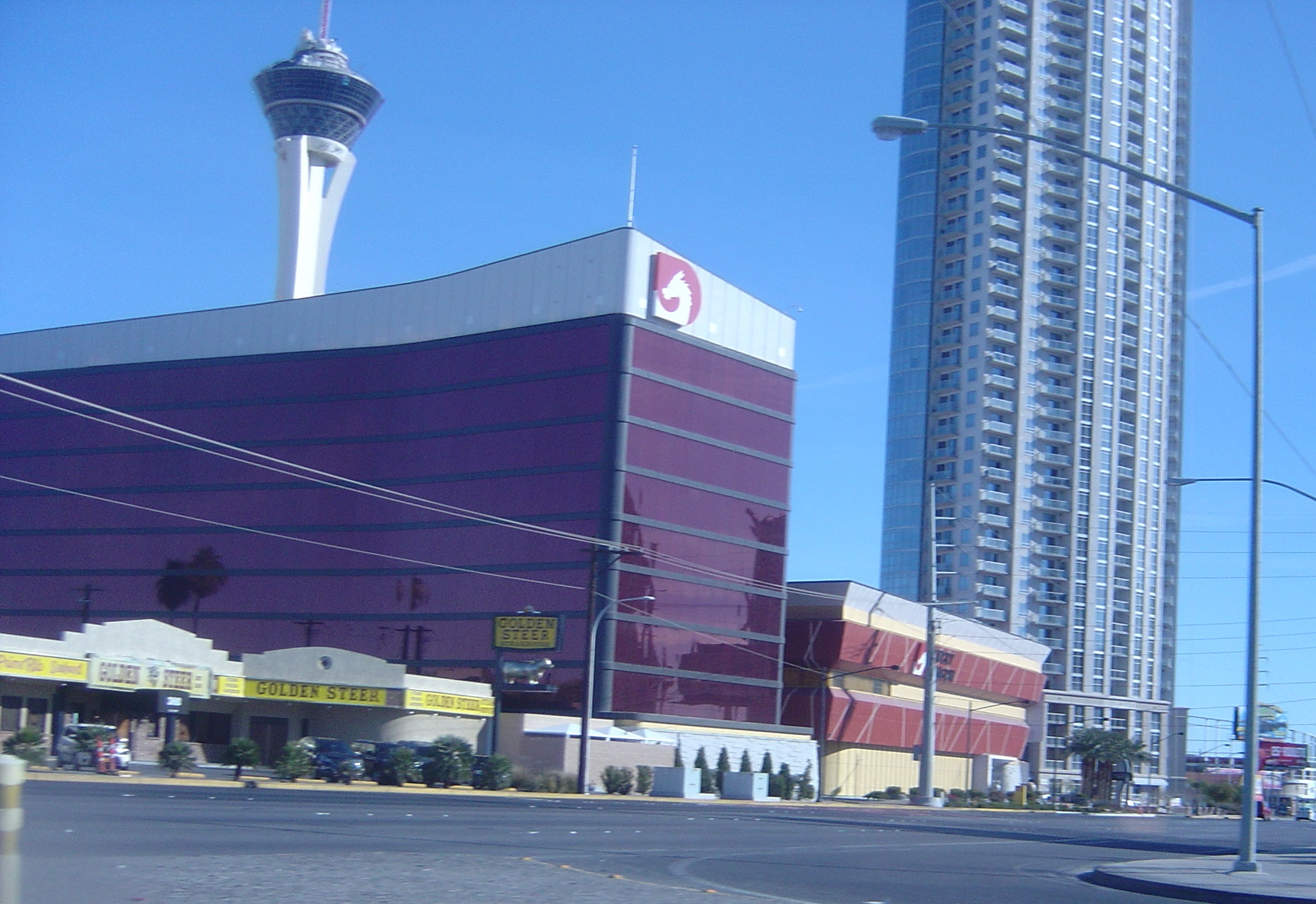
- Lucky Dragon in 2018

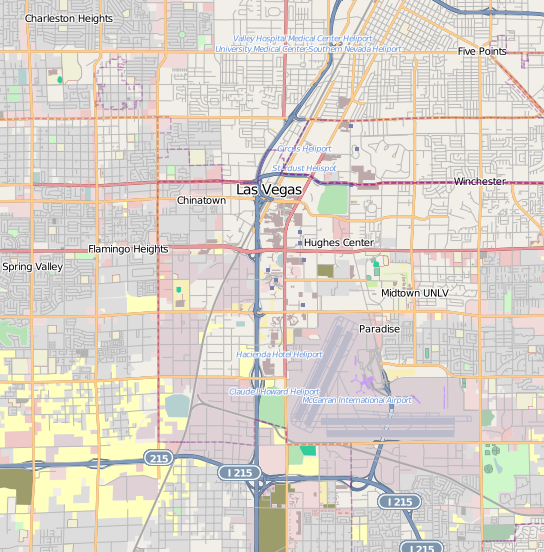
- Location within Las Vegas Boulevard Location within Nevada
- Interactive map of Ahern Luxury Boutique Hotel
- Location: Las Vegas, Nevada, U.S.; 300 West Sahara Avenue; 36.144052°N 115.160384°W
- Opened: November 19, 2016; 9 years ago (as Lucky Dragon); Late 2019 (as Ahern Hotel)
- No. of rooms: 203
- Gaming space: 27,500 sq ft (2,550 m^{2})
- Casino type: Land-based
- Owner: Don Ahern
- Architect: Ed Vance & Associates Architects
- Previous names: Lucky Dragon (2016–18)
- Renovated in: 2019–20
- Website: ahernhotel.com

Ahern Luxury Boutique Hotel (formerly Lucky Dragon) is a boutique hotel and former casino in Las Vegas, Nevada. The resort is located on 2.5 acres (1.0 ha) of land at 300 West Sahara Avenue, near the Las Vegas Strip.

Ahern Luxury Boutique Hotel is adjacent to the Allure Las Vegas high-rise condominium, opened in 2008 by developer Andrew Fonfa. The resort's property was once planned as the site of a second Allure tower, which was cancelled due to poor economic conditions. While selling units in the first tower, Fonfa decided to build a hotel and casino on the adjacent site. The Lucky Dragon was designed by Ed Vance & Associates Architects and was announced in February 2012, with groundbreaking in May 2015. The resort had a soft opening on November 19, 2016. An official grand opening was held on December 3, 2016.

The Lucky Dragon was heavily inspired by Asian concepts in an effort to appeal to Asian customers, who were expected to be the resort's primary customer base. With 203 rooms and a 27,500 sq ft (2,550 m^{2}) casino, the Lucky Dragon was considered small in comparison to nearby competitors on the Las Vegas Strip. After experiencing low customer turnout, the Lucky Dragon's casino and restaurants were temporarily closed in January 2018 so the property could reorganize, while the hotel remained open. The hotel subsequently closed on October 2, 2018. It was sold in April 2019, to Don Ahern, who reopened the hotel later that year as Ahern Hotel. Ahern also planned to convert the casino into conference and convention space.

== History ==
=== Original plans ===
The resort is located on 2.5 acres (1.0 ha) of land at 300 West Sahara Avenue, a block west of the northern end of the Las Vegas Strip, an area that had become known for a number of vacant lots, older resorts, and failed projects. The property is located between the Golden Steer restaurant and the Allure Las Vegas condominium high-rise tower. Developer Andrew Fonfa had initially purchased the property as part of a five-acre parcel in 1987. At the time, Fonfa planned to build a hotel on the property, as he expected Circus Circus Enterprises to construct the Excalibur Hotel and Casino nearby, thus increasing tourism for the northern Las Vegas Strip. The Excalibur was ultimately built at the southern end of the Las Vegas Strip.

In May 2002, Fonfa proposed the Hilton Garden Inn, an eight-story Hilton-branded 200-room hotel with an attached 40,000 sq ft (3,700 m^{2}) casino that would be located on the property's east side. Hilton considered Fonfa's property to be a desirable location for one of their hotels, and approached him about a possible deal, although discussions were still preliminary at the time of the project's announcement. Under the partnership, Fonfa would own the hotel and casino, while Hilton would manage the hotel and would have no involvement in the casino operations. Fonfa was in negotiations with GE Capital to finance the project, and hoped to begin construction at the end of the year, with completion scheduled in 15 months. Construction was expected to cost $50 million. Four small commercial buildings located on the property were to be torn down to make room for the new resort. Fonfa changed his mind about the hotel-casino project after speaking with Las Vegas mayor Oscar Goodman and several city officials, stating that high-rise condominiums "is what the city wanted as part of its plan for residential living". In 2004, Fonfa was approved for plans to construct twin condominium towers on the property.

The Allure tower was opened in early 2008. The site of the Lucky Dragon had initially been planned for the second Allure tower, which was later cancelled because of poor sales caused by the Great Recession, and because of an oversupply of condominium high-rises on the Las Vegas Strip. To help sell units in the first Allure tower, Fonfa said that in 2008, "We realized we were going to need cash buyers. We went to LA and San Francisco and Vancouver and San Jose and put ads in all the Chinese newspapers in those communities. And we were very pleased with what came back, which was over 100 units sold to Chinese buyers." At that point, Fonfa then devised an idea to build a hotel and casino on the property originally planned for the second tower. In 2008, Fonfa and his sister, Gudren, revealed plans for a potential hotel-casino on the property adjacent to Allure. The $1.2 billion resort would be called Q, standing for "queer", and would cater to gay and lesbian people. The 45-story hotel would include 1,000 rooms, and would be managed by Wyndham. Fonfa did not formally announce the project as it was unclear when the American credit market would recover.

The Lucky Dragon project was later announced for the property in February 2012, as a 10-story hotel tower with 201 rooms and an 18,900 sq ft (1,760 m^{2}) casino, with 478 slot machines and a 446-space parking garage. The hotel-casino would be developed by Fonfa, and an Asian theme was chosen for the project as it was being financed by Chinese investors. The Lucky Dragon was designed by Ed Vance & Associates Architects.

=== Construction and financing ===
The Lucky Dragon was built by Penta Building Group, which worked on the project with its development manager, Grand Canyon Development Partners. Both companies worked closely with city planning officials to re-categorize the property as a single parcel rather than as phase two of Allure. As part of the effort, several lots were sold to Lucky Dragon LLP in order to develop the resort. Groundbreaking on the Lucky Dragon began in May 2015, with the pouring of the resort's foundation. The boutique hotel would contain nine stories, while the casino was expected to contain two stories. Work crews faced difficulties in pouring the concrete due to the heat during the Las Vegas summer. To avoid the heat, several concrete pours were completed during early morning hours, which resulted in noisy equipment for nearby businesses and residents directly north of the property. Material deliveries to the construction site also resulted in inconveniences for local residents, who received gift cards as compensation for the disruptions. After the hotel's lower portion was complete, construction crews added an additional floor every week. The hotel tower was topped out on September 11, 2015. The casino and six-story parking garage were still under construction at that time, with the resort expected to open in summer 2016. The project was being financed by funds through the United States federal government's EB-5 program, which offered foreign investors the possibility of U.S. residency.

On November 16, 2015, Fonfa and development partner William Weidner – the former president and chief operating officer of Las Vegas Sands, and one of the Lucky Dragon's backers – requested approval for tax increment financing from the Las Vegas Redevelopment Agency, in order to receive a bank loan to continue construction on the project, which had already raised $60 million through the EB-5 program. On November 18, 2015, the Las Vegas City Council rejected Fonfa and Weidner's request for $25 million in subsidies to help finance the $139 million project, which was expected to open in August 2016. Approximately 3,600 jobs associated with the ongoing project were lost due to the decision.

Work on the hotel's roof and parapet was expected to begin in December 2015. The following month, framing and drywall installation was underway, as well as the installation of the hotel's exterior curtain wall. The wall, designed by EV&A Architects and installed by Giroux Glass, Inc., was made of ruby red glazing. The Lucky's Dragon's project manager, Paul Dutmer, said, "To get this particular color of red, we went through several dozen testing samples. Once the sun hits it, it will be a bright red that will be hard not to see." The hotel tower was expected to be fully enclosed and waterproofed by the end of January 2016.

In May 2016, it was announced that the project had received full financing from Fonfa and Weidner's families. Construction was approximately 70 percent complete at that time, with the resort expected to open in the fourth quarter of 2016. It was later reported that the project's financing was through a $90 million loan issued to Fonfa by Snow Covered Capital, which initially provided a $30 million loan for construction and a $15 million revolving loan. Snow Covered Capital was the primary lender in the project. Through the EB-5 program, 179 foreign investors each provided $500,000 for a total of $89.5 million. They also each paid a $50,000 administrative fee.

The Lucky Dragon was planned to be the first Las Vegas resort to offer an "authentic Asian lifestyle experience". James Weidner, the son of William, was the managing principal of the Lucky Dragon. James Weidner stated that he was partly inspired to join the project because of trips that he took with his father to China. James Weidner stated that the project "presented an opportunity to do something here [in Las Vegas] that really respects the culture directly and approaches the Asian market, which is really powerful." Feng shui experts and design consultants were hired to ensure the entire resort had an authentic Asian appearance.

David Jacoby, chief operating officer for the resort, said during construction that, "This whole place has been very specifically feng shui'd, from the color patterns, to the carpets, to where the seats are, to where the cash is. There will be no fourth floor in the hotel - that's a superstition similar to what we have in the United States with the number 13. There's no number 4 anywhere on the property. Our phone numbers don't have a 4 in it. People in the front of the house of the resort will speak Mandarin, Cantonese and other Asian dialects. Signage is in Chinese first, English second. What we're trying to do is build an authentic cultural experience from the ground-up for Asian clientele, both locally and regionally throughout the United States." The resort's granite sidewalks were designed to imitate dragon scales. Ahead of its opening, Fonfa described the Lucky Dragon as a locals casino that would primarily rely on local Asian residents as its clientele, as well as Asian tourists from China and California. Fonfa expected local residents to account for 60 percent of the Lucky Dragon's customers. Las Vegas Weekly wrote that the Lucky Dragon, with its large focus on Asian customers, "might be the most specifically focused casino project in the history of Las Vegas".

=== Opening ===
Lucky Dragon logo (2016–2018)

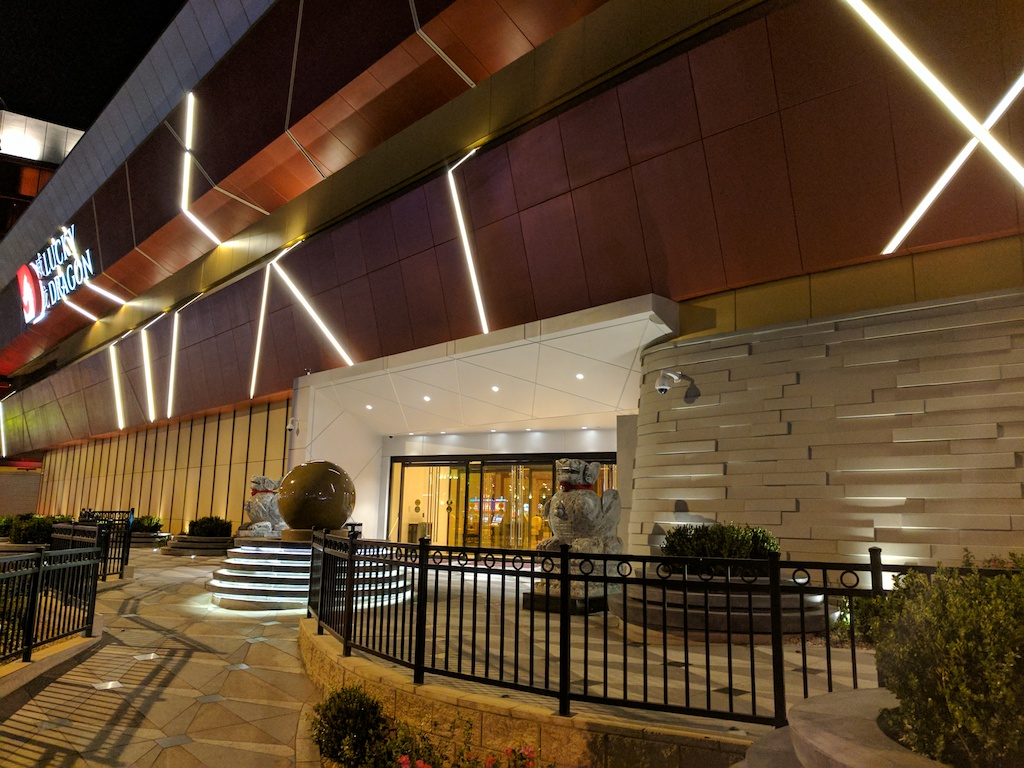
The casino entrance in 2017

On September 6, 2016, company officials announced that the resort would open on December 3, 2016. Lucky Dragon was expected to employ more than 800 people. The resort had a soft opening at 8:00 p.m. on November 19, 2016, with its official grand opening still scheduled for December 3. The Lucky Dragon opened with 203 hotel rooms, including 22 suites. Each room included a wall mural designed to represent the "peace and tranquility of ancient China," according to the hotel. The Lucky Dragon also featured a 4,500 sq ft (420 m^{2}) spa, while the 27,500 sq ft (2,550 m^{2}) casino offered popular Asian games such as baccarat, pai gow, and sic bo. The casino featured 37 table games and 300 slot machines, and was located in a two-story building that connected to the hotel tower through a bridge walkway. It was the first newly constructed hotel-casino to open in Las Vegas since The Cosmopolitan in 2010. The resort – considered small in comparison to nearby competitors – is connected to the adjacent Allure tower. The official grand opening took place on the afternoon of December 3, 2016, and was accompanied by a ribbon-cutting ceremony, costumed dancers dressed as Chinese lions and a dragon, and firecrackers. The first direct flights between Beijing and Las Vegas, launched a day before the Lucky Dragon's grand opening, were not expected to bring in additional customers to the resort, although officials welcomed the possibility. Fonfa envisioned some of the area around the Lucky Dragon possibly being redeveloped as a new Chinatown for Las Vegas over the next decade.

The Lucky Dragon's centerpiece was a 1.25 ton dragon chandelier that hung over a bar. Work on the chandelier began in May 2015, with nearly 800 people working on it until its completion. Installation of the chandelier was completed in November 2016, after two weeks. Following the closure of the resort, the chandelier was sold to the Muckleshoot Indian Casino in Washington.

In February 2017, the resort planned to add an additional VIP gaming area due to the popularity of its VIP club. For its VIP members, the casino also introduced a rolling-chip program, a concept that was common in Macau. In March 2017, Midwest Pro Painting and Penta Building Group claimed in court that they were owed money for their work on the Lucky Dragon during construction. Midwest Pro Painting stated that it was owed $793,300, while Penta Building Group alleged that it only received approximately $76.4 million and was still owed approximately $7.4 million for construction work. Both companies ultimately agreed to dismiss their claims.

=== Financial difficulties and closure ===
Approximately 100 employees – including top managers, and bar and wait staff – had been fired by late March 2017, as the result of poor customer turnout. In response, the casino began offering nightly entertainment – including Jazz Saturdays, and karaoke on Mondays – later that year. In September 2017, a default notice was filed against the Lucky Dragon over its $90 million loan. The default notice was not publicly revealed at that time. According to lawyers for the Lucky Dragon, the property was appraised at $143 million in November 2017, although creditors stated that the property was actually appraised at $60 million.

In December 2017, the Las Vegas Review-Journal visited the Lucky Dragon on several occasions and noted that the property appeared to be struggling, as its casino and restaurants were mostly empty of customers. The newspaper also interviewed local Chinese gamblers, who indicated that "the problem did not lie so much with Lucky Dragon's offering of entertainment or food as with its comparatively stingy gaming and comp policy". General Manager Jordan Seager said that the Lucky Dragon's comp policy "is in line, or even more fair" than other Las Vegas casinos, stating that the Lucky Dragon simply needed time for its customers to develop a close relationship with the property. The Lucky Dragon was also considered to be in a poor location near the northern end of the Las Vegas Strip, an area that was lacking in development and had little vehicle and pedestrian traffic. In addition, it faced competition from the nearby Palace Station and SLS resorts, which also targeted Asian clientele. Canadian investor Jason Chen signed a $400,000 deposit deal in December 2017 to lease the casino. Chen later sued Fonfa, Weidner and Seager, stating that they had not made him aware of the casino's financial difficulties.

On the morning of January 4, 2018, the casino and restaurants were temporarily closed and the property announced plans to reorganize itself by hiring new firms to operate those aspects of the resort. At the time, the Lucky Dragon had more than 500 employees. The property stated, "While this is a difficult decision, this repositioning paves the way for Lucky Dragon to establish new partnerships that will enhance the property's long-term positioning and provide a better guest experience." The casino was expected to reopen within six months. The hotel and a gift shop remained opened. Later that month, the Lucky Dragon's default status was publicly reported and notice of a foreclosure sale of the resort was filed with the county, with the foreclosure auction scheduled for February 6, 2018. At the time of the notice, Lucky Dragon owed $48.9 million on its $90 million loan. On the morning of the scheduled auction, it was delayed until February 22, 2018, as requested by the trustee: First American Title Insurance.

On February 16, 2018, the Lucky Dragon entered Chapter 11 bankruptcy to preserve the jobs of its 98 employees, as well as to pay its creditors and to "provide certainty to the market", according to court documents. Management believed that auctioning the Lucky Dragon through bankruptcy court would be the best way to preserve and maximize the value of the resort. During a bankruptcy hearing on February 21, 2018, a judge ruled that there would not be a foreclosure auction of the resort, and that the hotel would remain open until March 27, 2018, when another bankruptcy hearing would be held. The hotel remained open following the hearing date, with room prices falling to $35.

As of May 2018, there were several prospective buyers, domestically and internationally, who were interested in the resort, which owed $308,103 in property taxes. The developers hoped to sell the property through bankruptcy court. However, Ryan Works, an attorney representing 118 of the project's EB-5 investors, said he would prefer a new investor rather than a sale, which he feared would wipe out the ownership stakes of his clients. Works stated that EB-5 investors spent the most money on the project and that none of them had received permanent U.S. residency. A judge approved bid procedures for the resort later that month, and Fonfa was in discussions with various investment groups, including some in Asia. Fonfa expected to choose a group by the end of June 2018, and his group planned to auction the resort on July 20, 2018. Fonfa did not specify if his group planned to sell its entire stake in the resort or simply partner with the other group.

During July 2018, a letter of intent was signed between Fonfa's group and two companies – DeBartolo Development and Achieved Management – for a joint venture, at a bid price of $53 million. The bankruptcy auction was ultimately held on September 10, 2018. Fonfa's group had presented several prospective buyers, including Dotty's and The Meruelo Group, but Snow Covered Capital became the new owner of the land through a credit bid. Snow Covered Capital stated that the resort's operations "have been a dismal failure," stating that the hotel had lost approximately $200,000 for each month during the bankruptcy case. Three days after the auction, lawyers for the resort filed a motion to close the hotel immediately and end payments to employees and vendors, with the closure intended to ensure an efficient transition of ownership to Snow Covered Capital.

The hotel closure was approved by a U.S. bankruptcy judge, and took effect on October 2, 2018, while a foreclosure auction was expected to take place at the end of the month. Prior to the auction, discussions had been held about eventually reopening the Lucky Dragon without casino space, which could be converted into meeting space or an Esports lounge. The foreclosure auction was held on October 30, 2018, with a minimum bid of $35 million. With no bids made, Snow Covered Capital retained ownership of the Lucky Dragon. In February 2019, 40 Chinese EB-5 investors sued Fonfa, Weidner, Jacoby, and several limited liability companies. The investors claimed that they were "fraudulently induced" by the developers to invest in the project. The investors had yet to receive U.S. residency and sought a refund of their investment. In April 2019, Snow Covered Capital sued Fonfa, Weidner and Jacoby, alleging that they were required to reimburse the company for the cost of purchasing the Lucky Dragon.

=== Ahern Luxury Boutique Hotel ===
Following the auction, the property received interest from numerous prospective buyers, although the listing broker stated that approximately 98 percent of them were "dreamers" with no realistic chance of closing on a purchase of the property. On April 22, 2019, the Lucky Dragon was sold for $36 million to Don Ahern, the chairman and CEO of a local construction-equipment firm. Ahern was among few prospective buyers who was financially capable of purchasing the property. Ahern intended to eventually reopen the hotel and convert the casino area into conference and convention space. He also planned to give the property a new name, which would be determined at a later date. In May 2019, Ahern announced plans to have the hotel reopened within 60 days, and to have the convention space opened around November. The opening was later delayed.

It eventually reopened as the Ahern Hotel and Convention Center in late 2019, with redecorated rooms and new signage, while retaining the red exterior of its predecessor. Ahern marketed the property as an upscale boutique hotel. Chinese-themed statues were removed, and the dragon chandelier was sold to the Muckleshoot Indian Casino in Washington. Work to transform the casino into convention space was expected to begin in March 2020. Ahern estimated that he was spending less than $10 million on the changes, including new restaurants. He hoped the entire resort would be ready in time for a grand opening on July 4, 2020. However, the opening was delayed because of the COVID-19 pandemic and its effects on the state. Ahern later hoped to have the renovations finished in October 2020. During the pandemic, the hotel offered free meals to first responders.

In August 2020, the hotel lobby hosted an evangelical event by Paula White, the personal pastor to Republican U.S. president Donald Trump. The event was part of Trump's re-election campaign, and it attracted hundreds of guests. This was an alleged violation of pandemic safety orders issued by Nevada governor Steve Sisolak, a Democrat. The orders prohibited gatherings of more than 50 people, and Sisolak criticized the event for going over the limit. The Ahern Hotel had been warned not to host the event, and was fined a $250 civil penalty for doing so. The Trump campaign and event organizers noted that Nevada hotels were allowed to operate at 50-percent capacity under Sisolak's order. The lobby had a maximum capacity of 1,600 people, and the event garnered 550 guests.

Later in the same week, the hotel hosted the Mrs. Nevada pageant with 250 people. Las Vegas city officials and local police arrived to shut down the event over pandemic concerns, but they allowed it to resume after family members and audiences were removed from the premises. The hotel was not fined. Ahern is a Republican supporter, and the hotel's manager believed that the pageant shutdown was politically motivated as retaliation for the earlier Trump event. Previous events of similar size had been held at the hotel recently without issue. On August 24, 2020, the hotel filed a lawsuit against the city, the state, and Sisolak, challenging his COVID-19 orders. Two days later, the Nevada Occupational Safety and Health Administration issued a fine of $10,930 to the hotel, citing four violations of Sisolak's orders during the Trump event and pageant. A judge dismissed the lawsuit in August 2021, stating that the restrictions were reasonable and necessary for protecting public health. In addition, all occupancy restrictions had been lifted by that point.

== Restaurants ==
In August 2016, officials announced a contest to create a name for the Lucky Dragon's night market restaurant – the resort's last unnamed eatery – with the winner receiving a weekend stay package. The Lucky Dragon featured five restaurants upon opening:

- Dragon's Alley, a food court, featuring a lantern-lit space that was designed as a night market. Dragon's Alley featured a show kitchen known as Jewel Kitchen that extended onto the casino floor, allowing players to watch as the food is prepared.
- Pearl's Ocean, a dim sum restaurant.
- Phoenix, a 60-seat fine-dining restaurant.
- Cha Garden, a 24-hour, indoor/outdoor tea garden and lounge, extending from the hotel lobby to the pool area. Cha Garden offered 50 different teas, and remained open after the closure of the other restaurants in January 2018.
- Bao Now, a 24-hour eatery offering grab-and-go foods.

Each restaurant offered only authentic Chinese food, which company officials expected to be the resort's primary advantage to bringing in customers. In February 2017, plans were announced for the temporary closure of Dragon's Alley so a noodle bar could be added. There were also plans to move Pearl's Ocean from the second floor to a larger space on the first floor, where it would occupy the dining area of Dragon's Alley. The casino's new VIP area was to occupy the space formerly used by Pearl's Ocean. Dragon's Alley closed some time in 2017. At the end of the year, prior to the closure of the Lucky Dragon's restaurants and casino, there had been plans to reopen Dragon's Alley as a different food and beverage business.

Ahern Luxury Boutique Hotel includes an Italian restaurant called Ottimo Gourmet Kitchen & Pizzeria and a steak restaurant called Joel's Chophouse, helmed by Las Vegas veteran chef Joel Ott.
