= Margaritaville Resort Biloxi =

Coordinates: 30.390810°N 88.862094°W

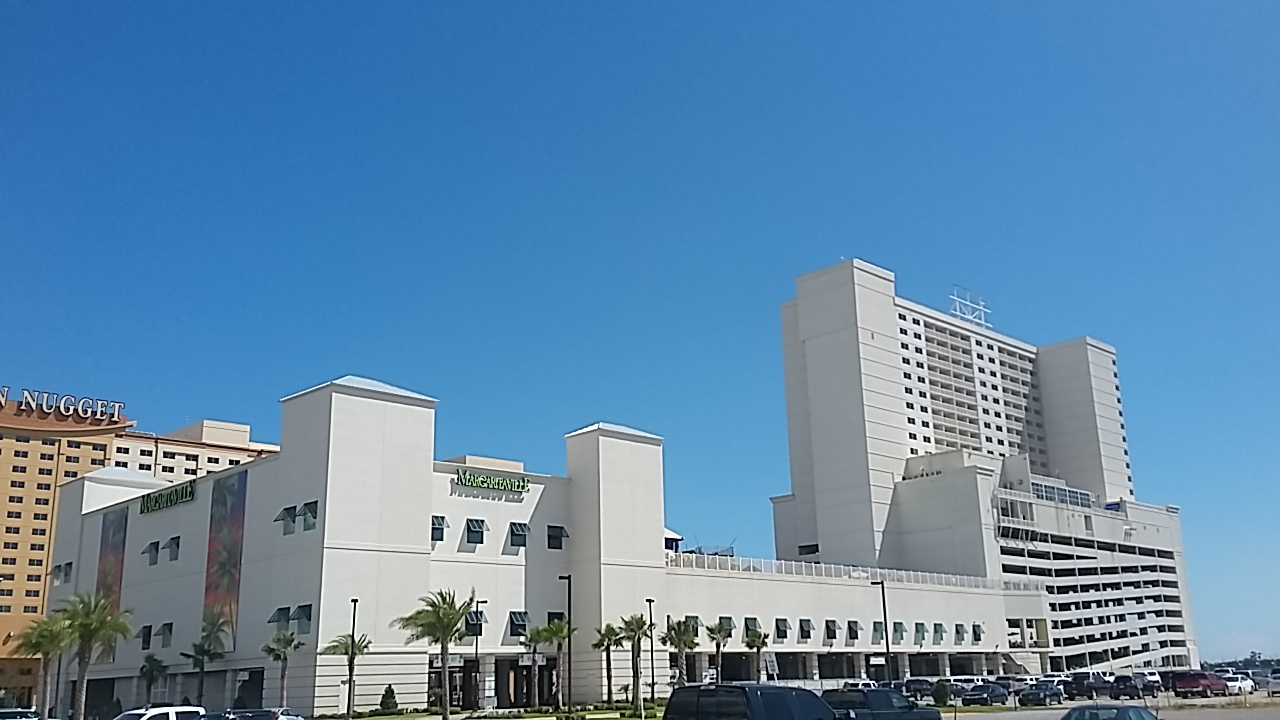
- Interactive map of the Margaritaville Resort Biloxi area
- Former names: Casino Magic Biloxi

General information
- Location: Biloxi, Mississippi, 195 Beach Boulevard
- Opened: June 5, 1993 (as Casino Magic); June 23, 2016 (as Margaritaville)
- Closed: August 28, 2005 (as Casino Magic)
- Owner: Biloxi Lodging

Other information
- Number of rooms: 373

Website
- margaritavilleresortbiloxi.com

Margaritaville Resort Biloxi is a resort hotel in Biloxi on the Mississippi Gulf Coast. It previously operated with a dockside casino as Casino Magic Biloxi Casino & Hotel, until it was severely damaged by Hurricane Katrina in 2005. The property has a 373-room hotel, located on 10.6 acres (4.3 ha) of land.

Casino Magic and its neighbors, the Isle of Capri Biloxi and Grand Casino Biloxi made up a district known as "Casino Row".

== History ==
=== Casino Magic ===
Casino Magic Corp., operator of a casino by the same name in the Gulf Coast town of Bay St. Louis, unveiled plans in January 1993 for a second casino barge, to be located in Biloxi next to the Isle of Capri casino at Point Cadet. The casino would be three stories, with a companion five-story floating parking garage. The casino opened on June 5, at a cost of $55 million. Additional space opened in December, bringing the total to 55,000 square feet (5,100 m^{2}) of gaming, with 1,160 slot machines, 69 table games, and a keno parlor.

Regulations required Casino Magic to build a 250-room hotel or spend at least a quarter of its investment on land, but the company met this requirement by developing its Bay St. Louis property, where it built a hotel, marina, RV park, restaurants, and a golf course. Without such amenities, the Biloxi casino largely relied on bus tours and day-trippers from nearby states. A $9-million parking garage was built in 1994, with plans to build a $15-million hotel on top of it, but the company wavered on those plans because of the high expense. In 1995 it bought Casino One Corp., which held a lease and option on 4.5 acres (1.8 ha) of land adjacent to Casino Magic, from the Gaming Corporation of America for $13 million in stock. The land was initially earmarked for parking, with a possible hotel and retail complex in the future.

Finally, though, the company pressed forward with the hotel on top of the parking garage, part of a $22-million plan begun in 1996, including a new facade and restaurant. The 378-room hotel opened on May 1, 1998. The company hoped it would help attract more high-end players from among the new overnight guests drawn by expanded jet service at the Gulfport-Biloxi Airport.

In October 1998, the property came under the ownership of Hollywood Park, Inc. (later Pinnacle Entertainment), which bought Casino Magic Corp. for $340 million. Pinnacle quickly sold off the Bay St. Louis property, along with its Boomtown Biloxi casino, enabling it to focus resources on Casino Magic Biloxi. Plans included two new parking garages to be built jointly with the Isle of Capri and Grand Casino, and an additional 300-room hotel, possibly to be developed with Jimmy Buffett under his Margaritaville brand. Construction plans for the new hotel were pushed back to 2006, though, while Pinnacle focused on building the L'Auberge du Lac Resort in Louisiana.

=== Destruction by Hurricane Katrina ===
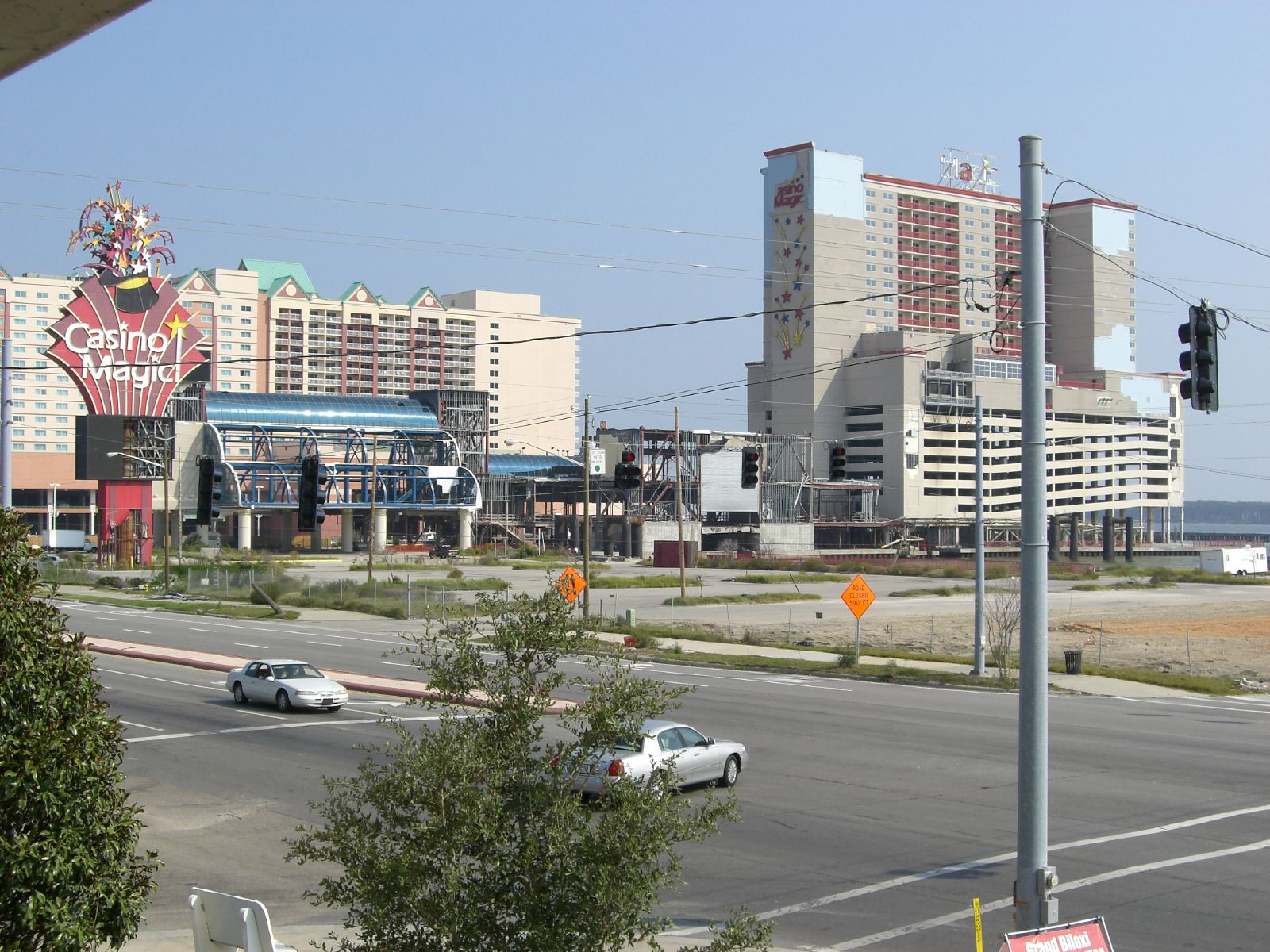
Casino Magic's shuttered hotel, a year after Hurricane Katrina washed away the casino barge. The Isle of Capri Casino is seen in the background.

Planning for a hurricane strike began early in the property's history. The company hoped to install an anchoring system in Biloxi's Back Bay, where the barges could weather a storm away from the open sea, but the plan was rejected by local officials who feared the vessels could become debris, and damage homes or bridges. Instead, Casino Magic installed a massive mooring system and acquired a submersible barge that could be sunk offshore from the barges to act as a breakwater. The first hurricane to strike the region after the opening of casinos was Hurricane Georges in 1998, a Category 2 storm which caused $2.5 million in damage to Casino Magic.

In 2005, with Hurricane Katrina approaching, the state ordered all coastal casinos to close on August 28. The storm made landfall the next day, and the storm surge carried the Casino Magic barge 400 feet from its mooring spot, leveling a pawn shop across Beach Boulevard, and sections of the hotel building were destroyed.

Pinnacle initially said it would rebuild the casino, but later said it might instead put the insurance settlement money into its two casinos being developed in St. Louis, Lumière Place and River City Casino. It ultimately decided to exit the Biloxi market, giving Casino Magic plus $25 million to Harrah's Entertainment, owner of the adjacent Grand Casino, in exchange for a hotel and two riverboat casinos, heavily damaged by Hurricane Rita, in Lake Charles, Louisiana.

=== Margaritaville ===
Harrah's joined with Jimmy Buffett in 2007 to begin construction on the $700-million Margaritaville Casino Resort, which would incorporate the Casino Magic hotel tower. Construction was suspended, however, in 2008, due to the financial crisis and Harrah's near-bankruptcy after being taken private. In 2011, Buffett announced new plans for what would become the Margaritaville Casino and Restaurant, elsewhere in Biloxi, marking the end of his project with Harrah's. The city later declared the hotel tower a blighted building, demanding that it be repaired or demolished.

After the Margaritaville Casino closed in 2014, developers with Biloxi Lodging announced new plans for a Margaritaville Resort on the Casino Magic site. The family-friendly, non-gaming resort opened on June 23, 2016.

== See also ==
- List of casinos in Mississippi
