= Edward Vance =

American architect (born 1957)

Edward A. Vance
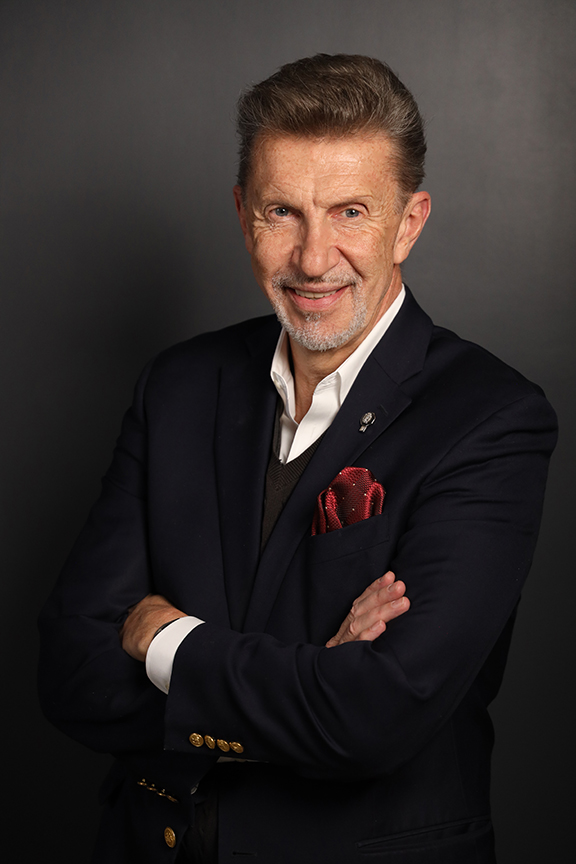
- Edward A. Vance, FAIA
- Born: May 28, 1957 (age 69); Redfield, South Dakota
- Education: North Dakota State University
- Occupation: Architect
- Employer(s): EV&A Architects
- Known for: Founder of EV&A Architects, 57th Chancellor of the AIA College of Fellows
- Spouse: Ruby Vance (m. 2011)

Edward A. Vance, FAIA (born May 28, 1957), an American architect, is the principal-in-charge of design and CEO at EV&A Architects, a specialty architecture firm he founded in Las Vegas, Nevada in 2006. Vance has been a registered Architect in 19 states and is certified by the National Council of Architectural Registration Boards (NCARB). He served as the 2019 Chancellor of the American Institute of Architects College of Fellows.

== Life and education ==
Vance was born in Redfield, South Dakota but spent his school years in Minnesota graduating from Eveleth High in 1975. Vance earned a bachelor of arts degree in 1979 from North Dakota State University, then studied in Western Europe and returned to North Dakota State University where he earned his bachelor of architecture degree in 1981.

== Work ==
After graduating from North Dakota State University, Vance served as an Intern Architect at Cossutta and Associates Architects, in Dallas TX. In 1987, he was recruited by SH Architects in Las Vegas where he worked as a senior designer for the firm for two years. He was later recruited by JMA Architecture Studios in 1989 where served as principal and finally president before his departure in 2006.

He was elected to AIA’s National Board of Directors in 2010, where he served a three-year term. In 2012, he became a Richard Upjohn Fellow. He was elevated to the AIA College of Fellows in early 2014 and received the AIA Regional Silver Medal in October of the same year, the highest honor bestowed on an architect in a six-state region. Vance is actively registered as an Architect in nine states and is NCARB certified. In 2006, he founded Ed Vance & Associates Architects in Las Vegas.

He is a former adjunct professor at UNLV’s College of Architecture, and continues to guest lecture and provide sketching clinics for students in the program.

In 2024, his firm completed the design of the St. Jude's Ranch trauma treatment center in Boulder City, Nevada, a $25 million, 10-acre campus featuring nine interconnected buildings arranged around a central garden to provide specialized care for child trafficking victims.

== Projects ==
=== Hospitality ===
- Thunder Valley Casino Resort
- Magnolia Bluffs Casino
- Island View Casino Resort
- Las Vegas Grand
- Lucky Dragon Casino

=== Commercial Mixed-Use/Office/Industrial ===
- World Market Center Las Vegas
- The Las Vegas Expo @ World Market Center
- Republic Services North Las Vegas Recycling Center
- Credit One Bank Building
- Aristocrat Technologies Las Vegas
- Two Summerlin Office Building Las Vegas
- UNLV Harry Reid Research & Technology Park - Building 1
- The Howard Hughes Corporation's Corporate Offices in Las Vegas.

== Publications ==
Vance is the author of the books Architectural Sketches, published in 2008., Envisioning Nevada's Future, published in 2019, and Blueprint for Place Making, published in 2020.

== Honors ==
- AIA Nevada Young Architect Citation - 1998
- AIA Nevada Service Award - 2001
- AIA Nevada Silver Medal - 2006
- North Dakota State University's President's Silver Medal - 2008
- AIA Richard Upjohn Fellow - 2012
- Elected to the AIA College of Fellows - 2014
- AIA Regional Silver Medal - 2014
- AIA Nevada Firm of the Year Award - 2020
- AIA College of Fellows Leslie N. Boney "Spirit of Fellowship" Award - 2022

On November 14, 2023 the American Institute of Architects published in the AIA Architect newsletter that Vance's membership had been suspended for two years due to violating Rule 1.401 of the AIA Code of Ethics.
