= Island View Casino =

Hotel and casino in Gulfport, Mississippi, US

Coordinates: 30.363614°N 89.102244°W

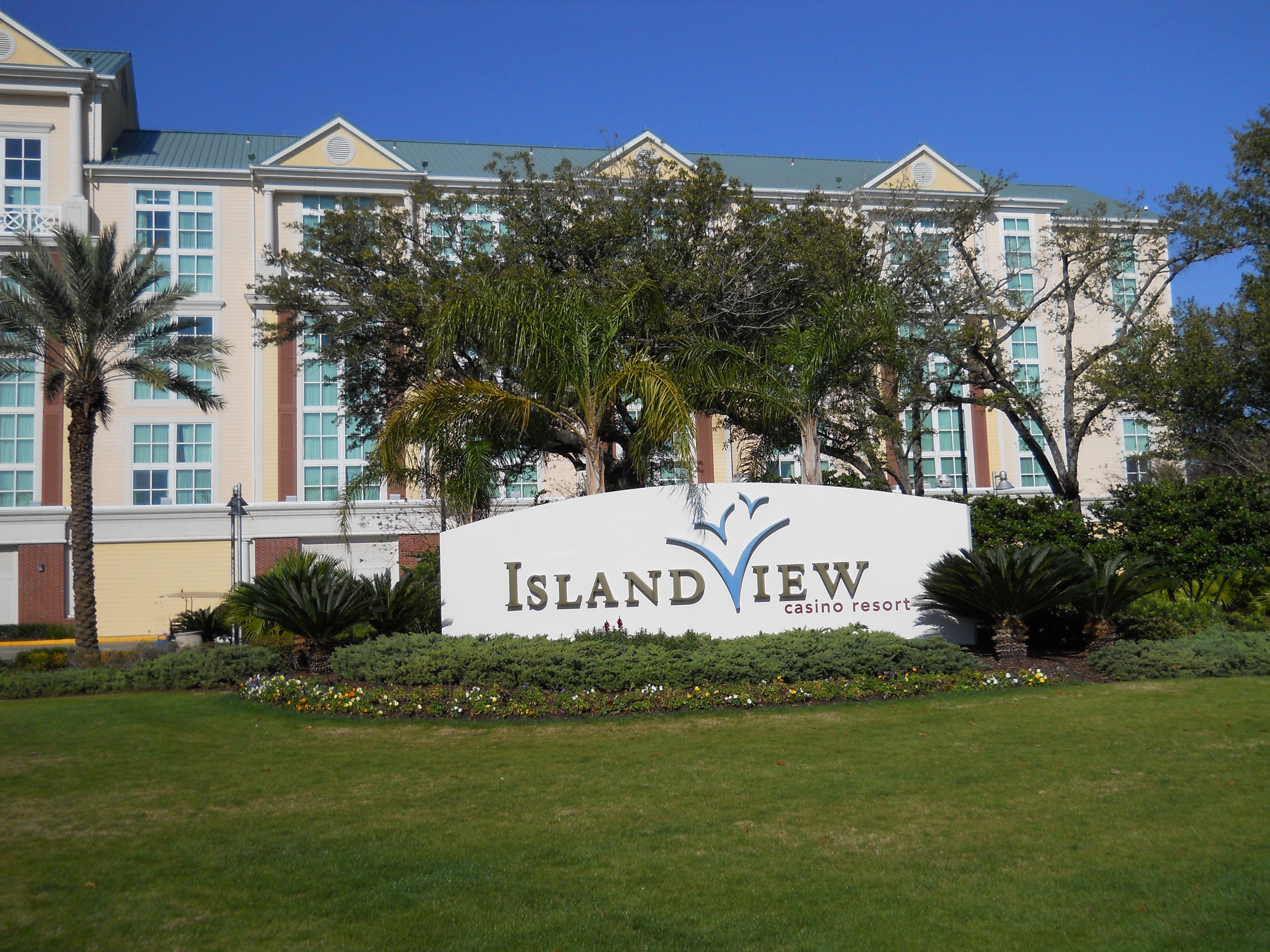
- Interactive map of Island View Casino
- Location: Gulfport, MS 39501; 3300 W Beach Blvd
- Opened: September 18, 2006
- No. of rooms: 970
- Gaming space: 80,000 sq ft (7,400 m^{2})
- Notable restaurants: Carter Green Steakhouse
- Casino type: Land-based
- Owner: Rick Carter and Terry Green
- Previous names: Grand Casino
- Renovated in: Phase III complete
- Website: islandviewcasino.com

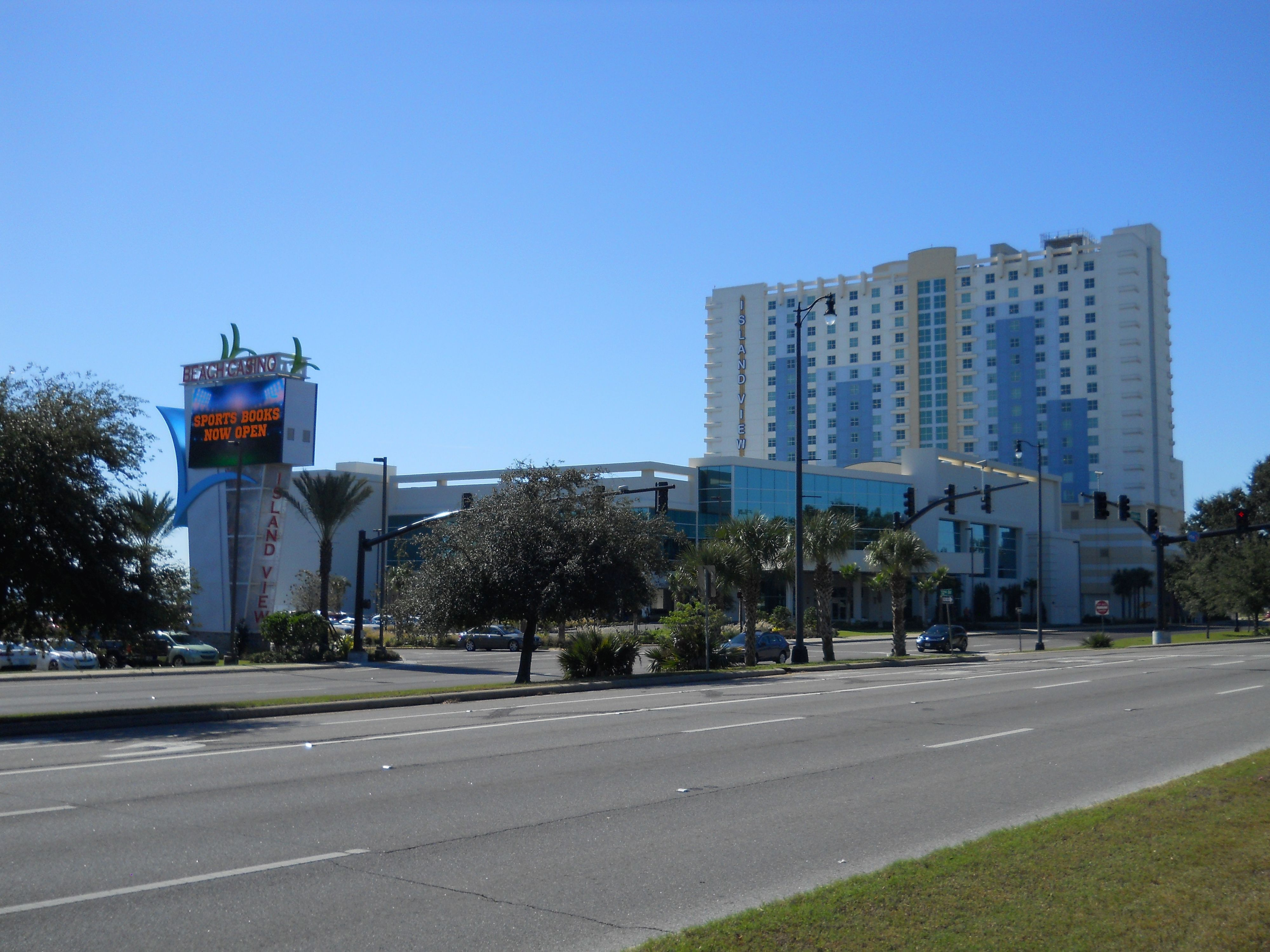
Island View's Beach Casino and Hotel complex

The Island View Casino is a casino and hotel located in Gulfport, Mississippi.

== History ==
The Island View is the successor to the Copa Casino, which was first located on a docked cruise ship and then a barge-based building at the Mississippi State Docks, across U.S. Highway 90 (Beach Blvd.) from the current location. The Copa and its neighbor, Grand Casino Gulfport, were both destroyed by Hurricane Katrina. When Grand Casino's parent Harrah's Entertainment decided not to rebuild, it sold the Grand site to Copa owners Rick Carter and Terry Green. When Mississippi legislators changed casino laws to permit new casinos to be built on dry land, the duo used the Grand's former hotel as a temporary casino for Phase I of their redevelopment. Currently the Island View Casino is the only casino left in Gulfport after the destruction caused by Hurricane Katrina.

The new facility (Phase I) opened on September 18, 2006, with 1,033 video poker and slot machines and 15 table games, a 350-seat Island View buffet, C&G Grille, and a 563-room hotel.

Phase II was completed on May 14, 2007, adding more gaming space, as well as, Emeril's Gulf Coast Fish House and a new multi-level parking garage.

In June 2010, Emeril's Gulf Coast Fish House closed and was replaced by Carter Green Steakhouse.

In May 2008, Island View Casino opened a 9 table, 24-hour poker room, but the poker room closed in 2010 and was replaced by a slot tournament area.

In December 2009, a 24-hour Coffee Shop opened.

Additional improvements have included a new players club program (Island View Insider), a website for player use, and a guest swimming pool, which opened in 2011.

Another amenity includes the Windance Country Club, an 18-hole championship golf course located in Gulfport.

In April 2015, Island View Casino opened its Beach Tower hotel complex, which increased its accommodations to 970 guest rooms. The Beach Tower is located south of U.S. Route 90 in the former Grand Casino Gulfport property. Beach Tower amenities include seven food and beverage venues, spa, fitness center, gift shop, saltwater pool, and meeting facilities. Construction of a $75-million casino next to the Beach Tower began in May 2017 and was designed by architect Edward Vance of EV&A Architects. The casino was completed in June 2018.

== See also ==
- List of casinos in Mississippi
