= Allure Las Vegas =

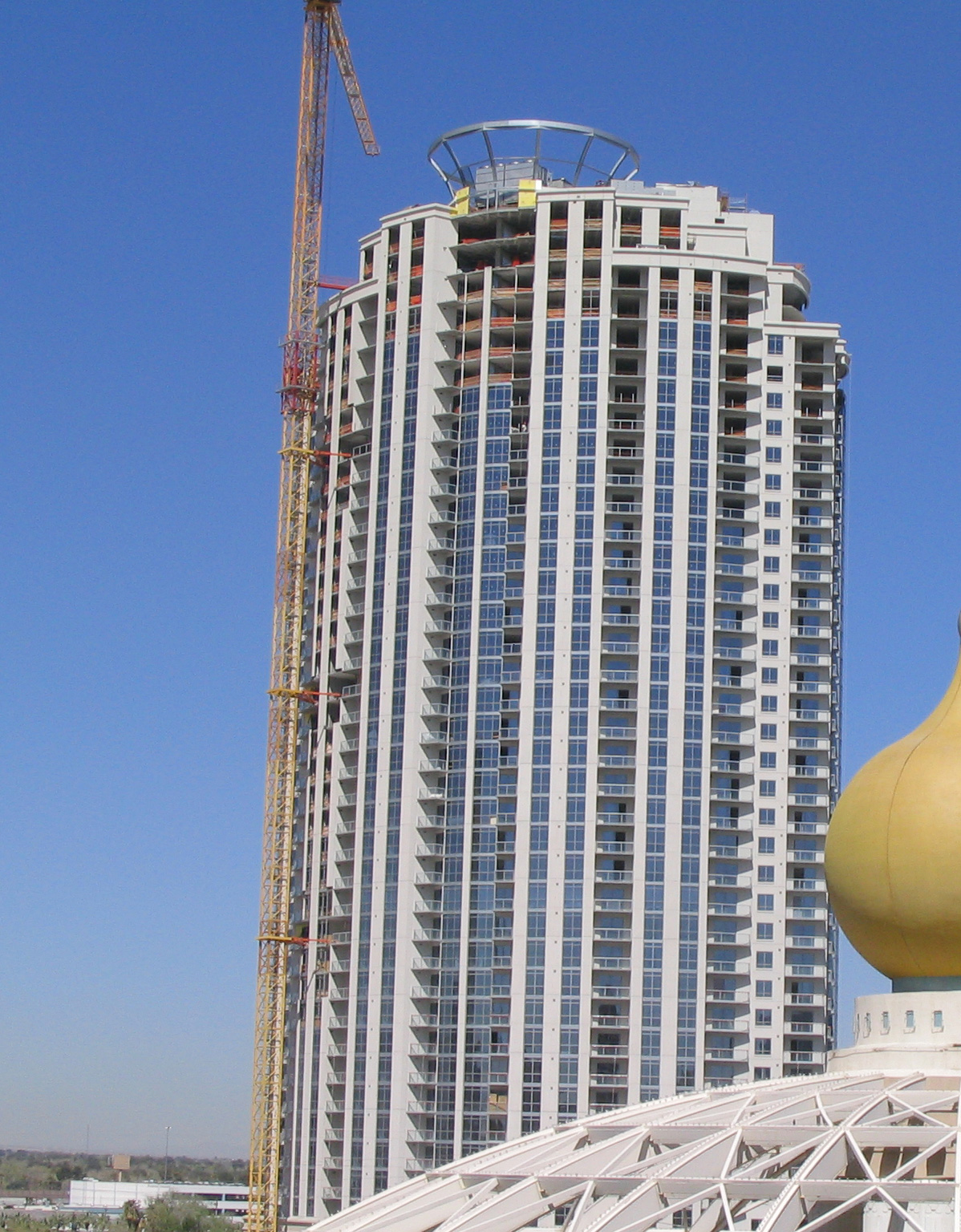
- Allure during construction
- Interactive map of the Allure Las Vegas area

General information
- Status: Completed
- Type: Residential
- Architectural style: Modernism
- Location: 200 West Sahara Avenue; Las Vegas, Nevada
- Coordinates: 36.14417°N 115.15917°W
- Groundbreaking: September 28, 2005
- Completed: 2007
- Opening: December 2007

Height
- Roof: 466 ft (142 m)

Technical details
- Floor count: 41

Design and construction
- Architect: EDI Architecture
- Developer: Fifield Realty Company
- Engineer: Englekirk Partners
- Main contractor: Bovis Lend Lease

Allure Las Vegas is a condominium tower in Las Vegas, Nevada. The 41-story, 466 ft (142 m) tower was built between 2005 and 2007 and was designed by EDI Architecture. Construction was managed by Bovis Lend Lease.

A second tower was to be built on property adjacent to the first tower, but these plans were cancelled because of poor sales caused by the Great Recession, and because of an oversupply of condominium high-rises on the nearby Las Vegas Strip. The Lucky Dragon Hotel and Casino was ultimately built on the adjacent property, and later converted to the Ahern Hotel in 2019.

Positioned on Sahara Avenue, the southernmost boundary of Las Vegas, Allure was the tallest residential building within the city of Las Vegas when it was completed in 2007.

== History ==
=== Early history ===
In 1987, developer Andrew Fonfa purchased five acres on West Sahara Avenue, near the northern end of the Las Vegas Strip. At the time, Fonfa planned to build a hotel on the property, as he expected Circus Circus Enterprises to construct the Excalibur Hotel and Casino nearby, thus increasing tourism for the northern Las Vegas Strip. The Excalibur was ultimately built at the southern end of the Las Vegas Strip.

In May 2002, Fonfa proposed the Hilton Garden Inn, an eight-story Hilton-branded 200-room hotel with an attached 40,000 sq ft (3,700 m^{2}) casino that would be located on the property's east side. Hilton considered Fonfa's property to be a desirable location for one of their hotels, and approached him about a possible deal, although discussions were still preliminary at the time of the project's announcement. Under the partnership, Fonfa would own the hotel and casino, while Hilton would manage the hotel and would have no involvement in the casino operations. Fonfa was in negotiations with GE Capital to finance the project, and hoped to begin construction at the end of the year, with completion scheduled in 15 months. Construction was expected to cost $50 million. Four small commercial buildings located on the property were to be torn down to make room for the new resort. Fonfa changed his mind about the hotel-casino project after speaking with Las Vegas mayor Oscar Goodman and several city officials, stating that high-rise condominiums "is what the city wanted as part of its plan for residential living."

By August 2004, former U.S. Senator Richard Bryan had teamed up with Fonfa and others to improve and redevelop the area around the property, which had become crime-ridden. That month, plans were approved for twin condominium towers that would stand 39 stories tall and cost $300 million to $400 million. Each tower was to feature 404 condominium units, with construction potentially lasting up to three years. Bryan said that it would be the most significant residential development to occur in the area since the 1950s. Groundbreaking was expected to begin in the first quarter of 2005. Each tower was expected to take 21 to 23 months to build, with construction on the second tower planned to begin six months after the first.

Fonfa began a joint venture with Fifield Companies, a developer based in Chicago. In January 2005, Fifield Companies announced Allure, a condominium twin-tower project to be built on the property, which had been occupied until that time by the Sushi House and India Oven restaurants, as well as a wedding chapel. The land was being cleared at that time, with construction expected to begin in the spring.

=== Construction ===
A groundbreaking ceremony was held on September 28, 2005. Bovis Lend Lease was the general contractor. Construction of the first tower reached the ninth floor in March 2006, with completion scheduled for late 2007. Sales were underway at that time for the second tower, which was to have 472 units. In August 2006, construction extended to the 30th floor, with 90 percent of the tower's units sold. A topping out ceremony was held for the first tower on November 13, 2006. At the event, Fonfa said that the second tower would be a condo hotel with 350 to 400 units. The second tower was to be taller than the first, and was to include a restaurant, a resort-style spa, a rooftop nightclub, and multimillion-dollar penthouses.

Work on the parking garage began in March 2007, while the tower's signature design aspect, a rooftop crown ornament, was beginning to take shape. The tower was expected to be completed in September 2007. In July 2007, the first tower – standing 41 stories high, with 248 units – was 85-percent complete, with construction on the parking garage also nearing completion. It was hoped that construction would conclude by the end of the year.

=== Opening and operation ===
Residents began moving into the first tower at the end of December 2007. At the time of completion, Allure was the tallest residential building within Las Vegas city limits. The second tower was cancelled because of poor sales in the first tower caused by the Great Recession, and because of an oversupply of condominium high-rises on the Las Vegas Strip.

In 2008, Fonfa and his lesbian sister, Gudren, revealed plans for a potential hotel-casino on the adjacent three-acre property initially planned for the second tower. The $1.2 billion resort would be called Q, standing for "queer", and would cater to gay and lesbian people. The 45-story hotel would include 1,000 rooms, and would be managed by Wyndham. That year, Fonfa began marketing Allure towards a gay and lesbian clientele to recover from financial losses, caused by customers who failed to close on condominium units that they had reserved. Three buyers filed lawsuits against the property, alleging water-supply problems. In April 2009, Fifield Companies announced that 10 Allure condominium units would be sold that month through an auction, after they were returned by buyers who cancelled their contracts. At the time, Allure's condominium units were approximately 50 percent sold. In 2012, the last new unit was put up for sale. As of 2017, Fonfa and his wife owned a unit on the 40th floor of the tower.

The adjacent property that was initially planned for the second tower was later developed into the Lucky Dragon Hotel and Casino, which is connected to the Allure tower. The Lucky Dragon operated from 2016 to 2018, and closed due to financial problems, before reopening as the Ahern Hotel.
