= Grand Casino Gulfport =

Former casino and hotel in Gulfport, Mississippi, US

Grand Casino
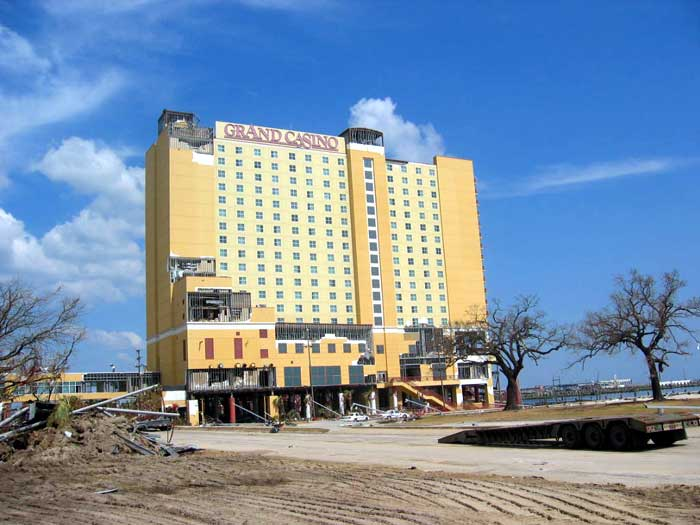
- Former Grand Casino hotel, after Hurricane Katrina washed its casino barge away
- Interactive map of Grand Casino
- Location: Gulfport, Mississippi; 3215 W Beach Blvd; 30°21′44.28″N 89°6′4.32″W
- Opened: May 1993
- No. of rooms: 1,000
- Gaming space: 90,000 sq ft (8,400 m^{2})

Grand Casino was a barge casino and hotel in Gulfport, Mississippi, United States. It was owned and operated by Harrah's Entertainment. Prior to its destruction by Hurricane Katrina, the casino was located on a series of floating barges as required by local law confining all casinos to mobile marine vessels at the time of the resort's construction. The hotels, parking garage, and associated facilities were constructed on land. The casino had two hotels with a total of 1,000 rooms, and a 90,000-square-foot (8,400 m^{2}) casino.

== History ==
The property was opened by Grand Casinos in May 1993. An expansion was completed in 1999, adding 594 hotel rooms and a spa and salon.

During 2005, Grand Casino Gulfport was a Caesars Entertainment property. After the ownership changed to Harrah's Entertainment, the company announced that this casino would be converted to the Harrah's brand. But before that could take place, the property was destroyed by Hurricane Katrina. While most of the hotel facility remained intact, the casino barge was washed ashore during the hurricane and partially blocked Beach Boulevard (U.S. Highway 90), the beachfront's main roadway. To clear the road, the casino was imploded on September 21, 2005.

In December 2005, Harrah's announced that the site and any remaining assets were being sold to Gulfside Casino Partnership, the owners of the adjacent Copa Casino Gulfport, the Grand's neighboring competitor whose own casino barge, which had been located in a berth at the Mississippi State Docks, was swept into the Grand's parking lot by Katrina. The purchase by Gufside was for its own post-Katrina expansion plans. The Skybridge and/or Catwalk redirect to a parking lot, and you can go to the hotel. The casino is now called the Island View Casino.
