= Magnolia Bluffs Casino =

Gambling venue in the United States

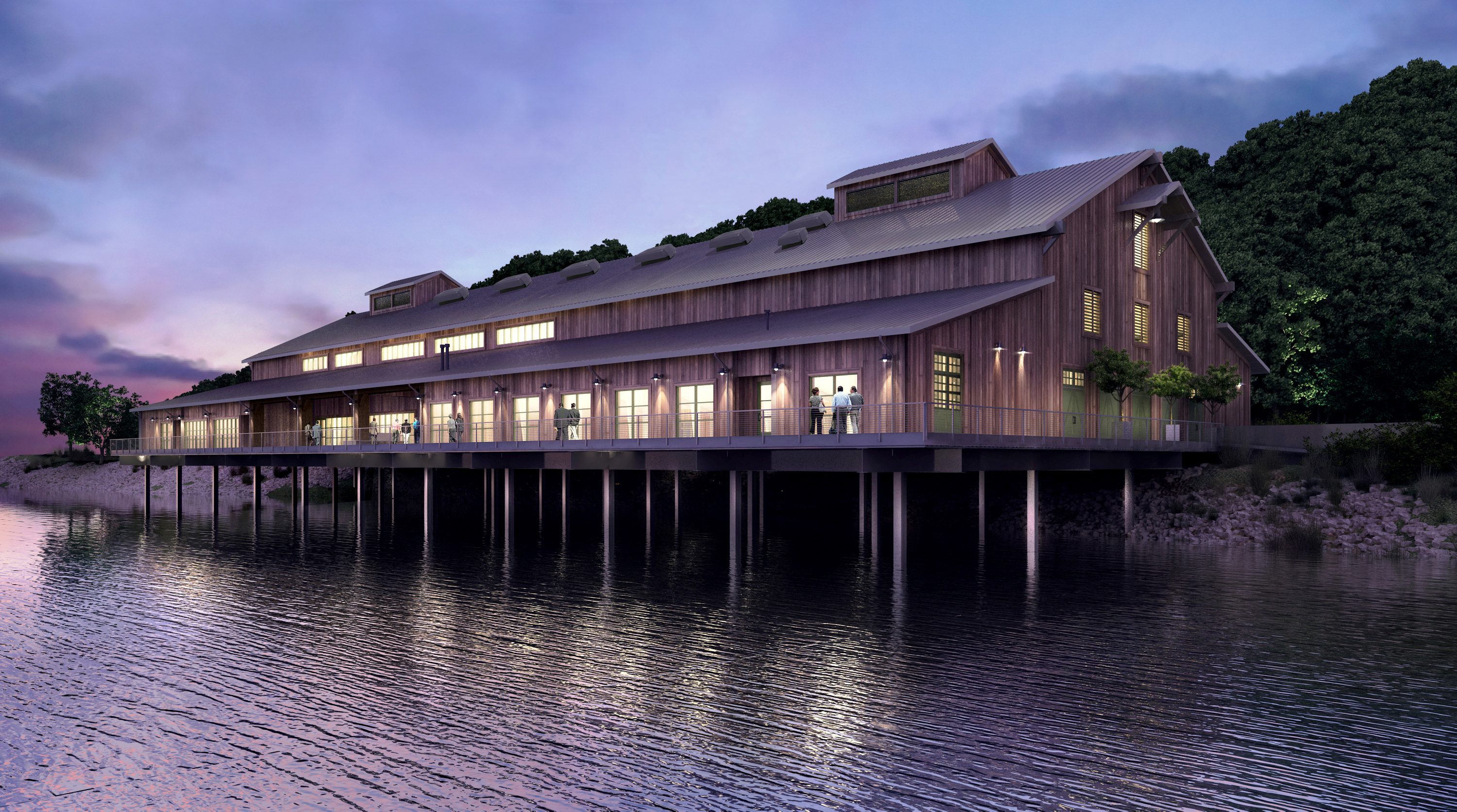
- The casino as seen from the Mississippi River

- Location within Mississippi
- Interactive map of Magnolia Bluffs Casino
- Location: Natchez, Mississippi; 7 Roth Hill Road; 31.5657°N 91.4051°W
- Opened: December 18, 2012 (casino); October 2015 (hotel)
- Gaming space: 45,000 sq ft (4,200 m^{2})
- Casino type: Riverboat casino
- Owner: Saratoga Casino Holdings LLC
- Architect: Edward Vance, FAIA

Magnolia Bluffs Casino is a casino in Natchez, Mississippi. It has 45,000 square feet (4,200 m^{2}) of gaming space, with 580 slot machines and 10 table games.

== History ==
The casino site was the location of a sawmill, Learned's Mill, which opened in 1828 and operated until 1962.

The project's original developer, the Lane Company, received preliminary approval from the Mississippi Gaming Commission in early 2008. The project was designed by architect, Edward Vance of EV&A Architects. Plans stalled due to a failure to find financing during the 2008 financial crisis. The building plan was scaled back from two floors to one in 2009. Kentucky-based Premier Gaming stepped in to lead the project, and began construction in late 2011. The casino opened on December 18, 2012.

Architect Edward Vance said the casino's weathered wood exterior was originally inspired by historic lumber mills, and later modifications were modeled on photographs of carriage houses.

In October 2015, Isle of Capri Casinos closed its Natchez casino, and sold its hotel and other non-gaming assets to Magnolia Bluffs for $11.5 million. The hotel became the Magnolia Bluffs Hotel.

The casino added a sportsbook in October 2018, shortly after sports betting became legal as a result of a U.S. Supreme Court ruling.

== See also ==
- List of casinos in Mississippi
