= SS Ryndam (1950) =

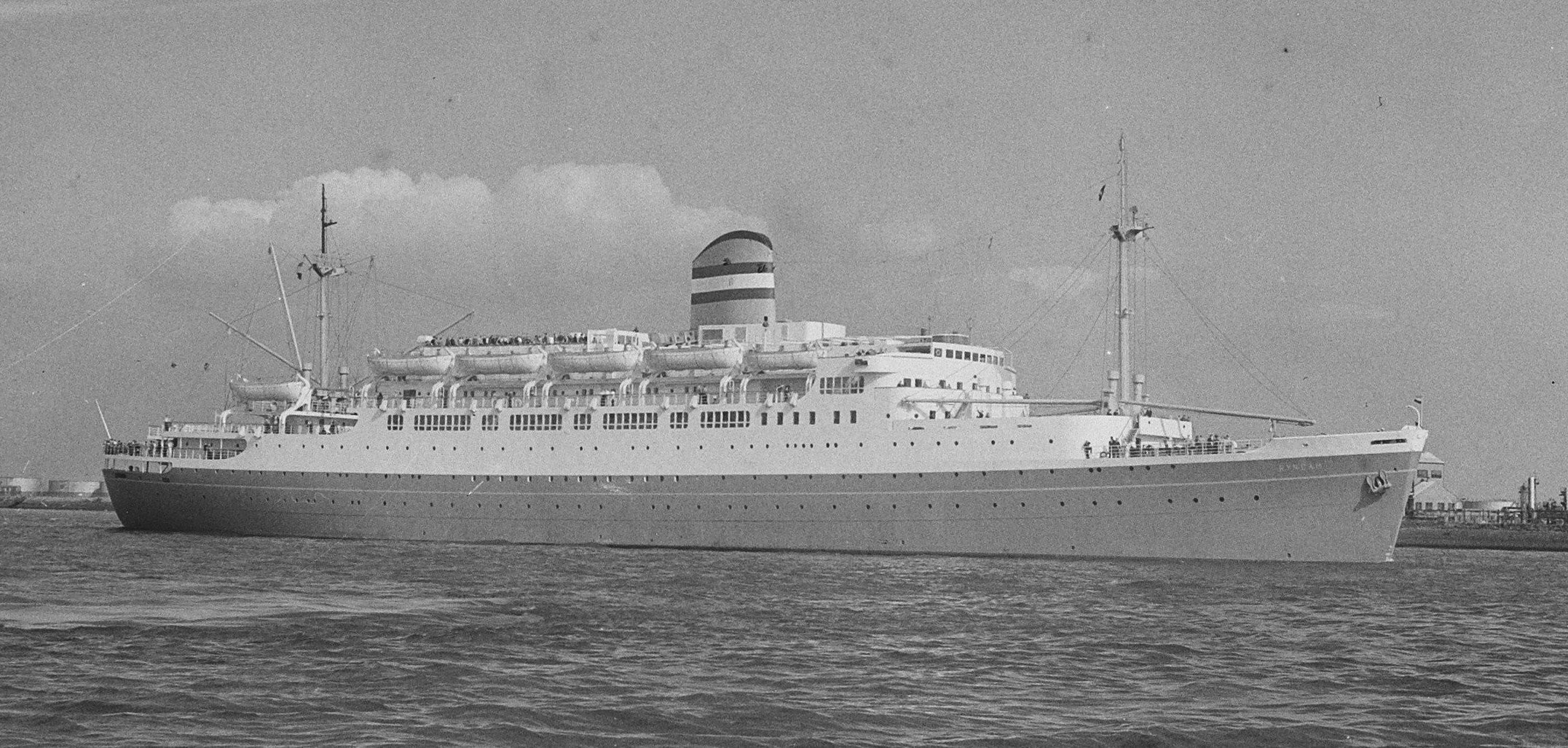
- Ryndam in 1951

History

Netherlands
- Name: Ryndam
- Owner: Holland America Line
- Operator: Holland America Line
- Builder: N.V. Dok- en Werfmaatschappij Wilton-Fijenoord, Schiedam
- Yard number: 732
- Laid down: 17 December 1949
- Launched: 18 December 1950
- Christened: 19 December 1950
- Completed: 1951
- Acquired: 10 July 1951
- Maiden voyage: 16 July 1951;
- In service: 1951–1966 with NASM
- Out of service: 2003
- Renamed: Atlas (1972); Pride of Mississippi (1988); Pride of Galveston (1991); Copa Casino (1993)
- Identification: IMO number: 5302776
- Fate: Sank en route to scrapping at Alang
- Notes: Originally ordered as combination cargo passenger ship Dinteldijk

General characteristics
- Type: cruise ship
- Tonnage: 15,015 GRT
- Length: 503 ft (153.3 m)
- Beam: 69 ft (21.0 m)
- Installed power: cross-compound General Electric steam turbines (built in 1945) 8,500 shp double-reduction geared
- Propulsion: Single screw
- Speed: 16.5 knots (31 km/h)
- Capacity: 39 first class, 854 tourist class
- Notes: Daily fuel consumption 53 tons, daily (considered low for that time)

SS Ryndam was an ocean liner built for Holland America Line in 1951. She was built by N.V. Dok en Werfmaatschappij Wilton-Fijenoord, Schiedam. She was christened by Mrs. C. Tjarda van Stakenborgh Stachouwer-Marburg (wife of the prewar Governor-General of the Dutch East Indies). The original intent of her design was to be designated as the freighter Dinteldyk (which was also designed to carry a small complement of passengers). A decision was made to have her redesigned as a liner in 1950, but she still retained the stout hull lines and sturdy machinery of a freighter. The ship played a major role in post-war immigration from Europe making frequent voyages to New York City and the Pier 21 immigration facility in Halifax, Nova Scotia, Canada. In March 1962 Edward & Alex Van Halen, and their parents Jan & Eugenia Van Halen, immigrated to the US aboard the SS Ryndam.

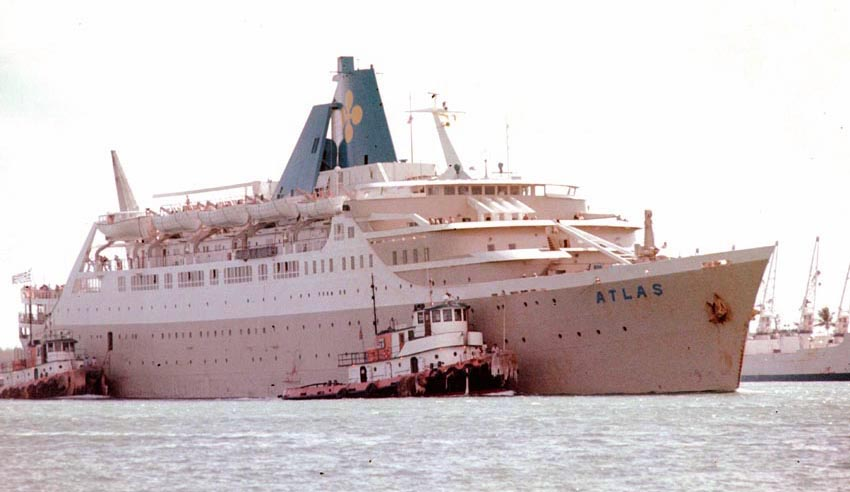
Ryndam as Atlas arriving in PortMiami, November 1974

For many years it was also the shipboard campus of the World Campus Afloat (now known as Semester at Sea), which sailed the world offering college courses for students from all over the world. In 1973, she was sold to a Panamanian subsidiary of a Greek shipping interest and extensively refitted with her bow line changed, many internal changes, and alterations to her superstructure. This was done to give her a more modern (at the time) 1970s design appearance. In 1988 she was sold to gaming interests and performed short cruises in the Gulf of Mexico under the name Pride of Mississippi, and in 1991 was renamed Pride of Galveston. In 1993, with her engines inoperable, she was towed to Gulfport, Mississippi where she was docked permanently and became the Copa Casino. When Copa Casino adopted a more permanent structure, a decision was made that she should be scrapped. She foundered off the coast of the Dominican Republic on her way, under tow, to the ship breakers in Alang, India on 16 March 2003.
