= Margaritaville Casino and Restaurant =

Entertainment venue in Biloxi, Mississippi

Coordinates: 30°24′06″N 88°51′35″W

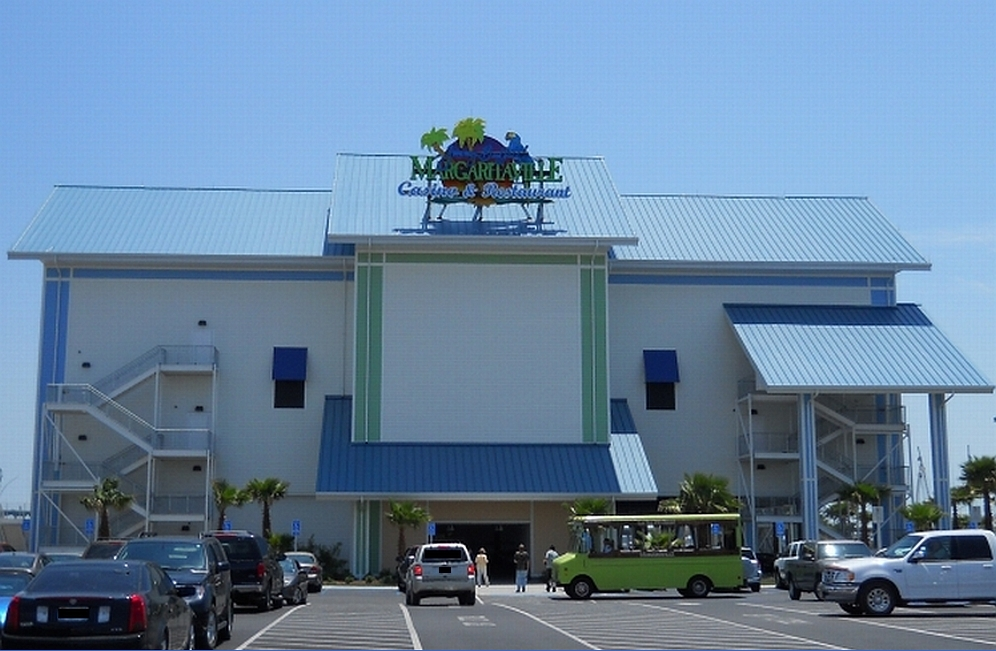
- Front view of casino, June 2012
- Interactive map of Margaritaville Casino and Restaurant Biloxi
- Location: Biloxi, Mississippi; 160 5th Street
- Opened: May 22, 2012
- Closed: September 15, 2014
- Theme: Margaritaville
- Gaming space: 21,000 sq ft (2,000 m^{2})
- Notable restaurants: Margaritaville
- Casino type: Land-based
- Owner: MVB Holdings

The Margaritaville Casino and Restaurant is a closed casino and restaurant in Biloxi, Mississippi in the United States. The 68,000-square-foot (6,300 m^{2}) property is in the "Back Bay" area of Biloxi. It opened on May 22, 2012 and closed on September 15, 2014. Its brand was licensed from Jimmy Buffett's Margaritaville.

== History ==
Jimmy Buffett, a native of nearby Pascagoula, tried to bring the Margaritaville brand to Biloxi as early as 2000, when discussions were held on building a hotel and amphitheater on 12 acres of beachfront land between the Casino Magic and Grand Casino.

Following Hurricane Katrina, Grand Casinos founder Tom Brosig came out of retirement and began looking for land to develop a casino, citing a desire to help rebuild the community. He settled on the Back Bay site where the Margaritaville Casino would ultimately open. According to Brosig, he nearly reached an agreement to use the Margaritaville brand in 2006.

Buffett instead joined with Harrah's Entertainment in 2007 to begin construction on the $700-million Margaritaville Casino Resort on the site of the Casino Magic and Grand Casino, which had both been destroyed by Katrina. Buffett was partly motivated by a desire to help the region's economic recovery from Katrina. Construction was suspended, however, in 2008, due to the Great Recession and Harrah's near-bankruptcy after being taken private.

Meanwhile, Brosig continued his efforts on the Back Bay site, but had difficulty raising financing during the Great Recession and the effects of the Deepwater Horizon oil spill. He was eventually able to assemble a total investment of $63 million, with "20 or 22" equity investors. A 20-year agreement was reached for the Margaritaville brand.

Buffett and Brosig unveiled their plans in 2011, describing a 68,000 sq ft (6,300 m^{2}), $48-million Margaritaville Casino at the former East Harrison County Industrial Park, without the involvement of Harrah's (now Caesars Entertainment). Groundbreaking was expected in April 2011 with a construction time of 9 months.

In March 2011, plans for the location won fast track approval from the city of Biloxi. On April 7, Buffett appeared before the Mississippi Gaming Commission and explained why the casino should be approved. Commissioners listened and then approved the project.

On May 22, 2012, the Margaritaville Casino & Restaurant opened to the public, featuring 820 slot machines, 18 table games, two levels of dining decks, and a marina with waterside entertainment, food, and drinks.

In June 2013, Margaritaville Biloxi became the first casino in Mississippi gaming history to offer outdoor gaming which includes three blackjack tables at LandShark Landing and Marina.

In December 2013, Doug Shipley, President & CEO, announced that Margaritaville Biloxi would break ground on a new hotel facility in the spring with anticipated completion a year later. The new hotel would feature 250 rooms, including 170 deluxe guest rooms and 80 two- and three-bedroom suites. In addition, they would offer timeshare units through a major international partner.

In July 2014, the casino announced that it would likely close by September, because of an unresolved dispute with the landlord that was blocking the financing needed to build the hotel. On September 15, 2014, Margaritaville Biloxi officially closed.

The property was listed for sale in 2015 with an asking price of $18 million.

In 2019, a new group of developers filed plans to reopen the casino as the Biloxi House at Point Cadet. Their $200-million project was to add a 300-room hotel and various other amenities to the site. Those plans were canceled because of the coronavirus pandemic.

In August 2023, after being closed for 9 years, the Margaritaville Casino & Restaurant complex was sold to MIC Limited, a company owned by businessman Harry Mohney who has opened Cat's Meow karaoke bars and Dick's Last Resort restaurants in New Orleans. Plans call for transforming the former Margaritaville Casino into an entertainment venue with restaurants and bars.

== See also ==
- Cheeseburger in Paradise (restaurant)
