= Copa Casino =

Defunct casino located in Gulfport, Mississippi

Coordinates: 30.361826°N 89.100151°W

- Interactive map of Copa Casino
- Location: Gulfport, Mississippi; 7 Copa Casino Blvd.
- Closed: 2005; 21 years ago

The Copa Casino was a casino located in Gulfport, Mississippi (USA). Prior to its destruction in 2005 by Hurricane Katrina, it operated a small casino that catered to local residents. The casino was originally housed in a former cruise ship, the Pride of Galveston, then later on a barge built to resemble an on-shore building, but which still floated on water to comply with Mississippi dockside gaming laws. The facility was located in a berth of the Mississippi State Docks.

== History ==
In the late 1980s, William "Si" Redd, a renowned figure in the gaming industry known as the "king of slot machines," teamed up with two up-and-coming restaurateurs from the Gulf Coast named Terry Green and Joel “Rick” Carter to form a partnership named Carter-Green-Redd Inc., doing business as Pride Cruise Lines, Inc., to establish a casino that would operate on a floating platform off the coast of Mississippi in international waters, where gambling was legal. For this purpose, they agreed to purchase the MV Jupiter on October 21, 1988, only for the Jupiter to sink off the coast of Greece later that same day. With their initial deal gone, they agreed a few days later to purchase a Dutch ocean liner, the SS Ryndam. The ship was renamed Pride of Mississippi in 1988 and, after relocation to Texas, Pride of Galveston in 1991.

In 1993, with state gambling laws recently loosened, she was docked permanently in Gulfport, Mississippi and became the Copa Casino. When Copa Casino adopted a more permanent structure—a barge—the vessel was sold to be scrapped.

As one of the two only casinos in Gulfport or Biloxi not to have an attached hotel (other than Boomtown Casino), the Copa catered to a locals market, featuring low-minimum table games and relatively high paybacks on slot machines and video poker.

The storm surge from Katrina swept the barge onto the parking lot of the neighboring Grand Casino Gulfport, with the barge coming to rest against the Grand's parking deck.

In December 2005, Harrah's Entertainment announced a deal to sell the former Grand site and remaining assets to the owners of the Copa. The Copa owners are using the new site for the new Island View Casino, which has opened a temporary land-based facility (now allowed after regulations were relaxed after Katrina) in the Grand's former hotel on the north side of Beach Boulevard. The new Phase I facility features the company's first hotel.
