= Strat =

Strat may refer to:

- River Strat in Cornwall, UK
- The Strat, a hotel and casino in Las Vegas
- Fender Stratocaster, electric guitar known as a Strat
- Strategy, which is sometimes shortened to "strat"
- Tony Stratton Smith, English rock music manager

== See also ==
- STAT (disambiguation)
- STRAT-X, American nuclear research project
- Strat-O-Matic, American sports board game manufacturer
