= STAT =

STAT, Stat., or stat may refer to:

- stat (system call), a Unix system call that returns file attributes of an inode
- Stat (TV series), an American sitcom that aired in 1991
- Stat (website), a health-oriented news website
- STAT protein, a signal transducer and activator protein
- Special Tertiary Admissions Test (STAT), an Australian scholastic aptitude test
- St. Albert Transit (StAT), the public transportation system in St. Albert, Alberta, Canada
- stat, an abbreviation of statim that means "immediately" in Latin
- Stat., abbreviation of United States Statutes at Large
- Statistic (role-playing games), a piece of data which represents a particular aspect of a fictional character
- STAT: Standing Tall and Talented, Children's book series

== See also ==
- Strat (disambiguation)
