= The Strat =

Casino hotel in Las Vegas, Nevada

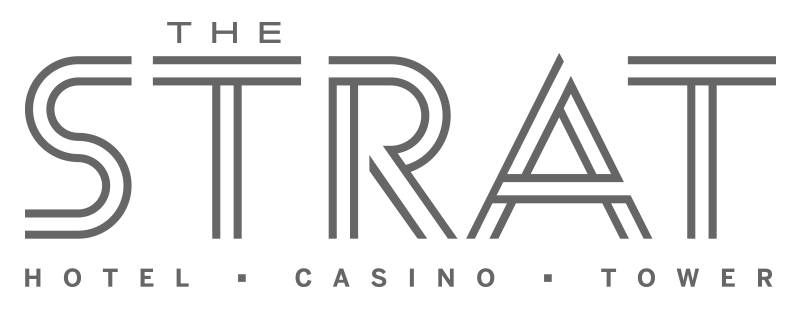

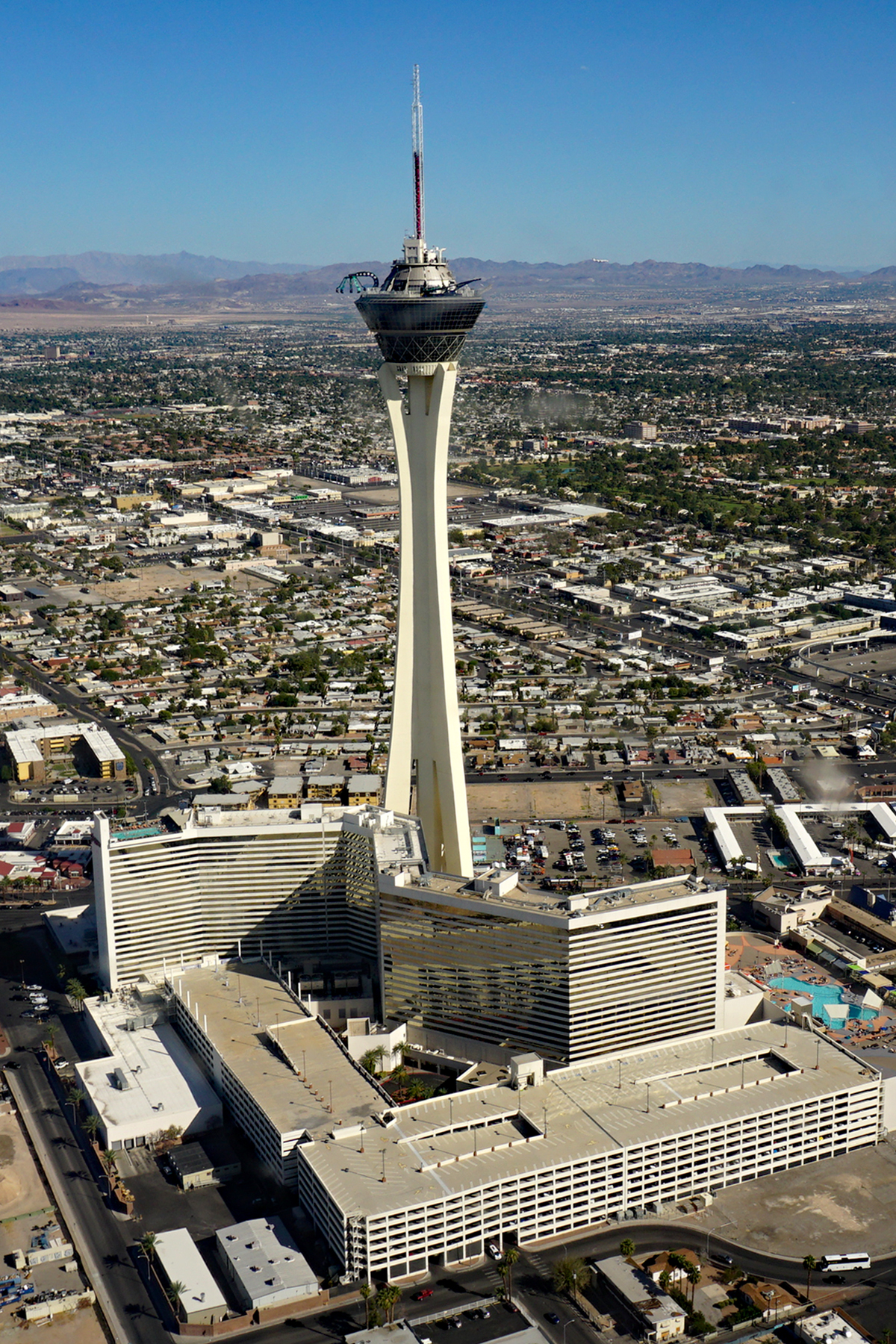
- The Strat tower and resort in 2017

General information
- Status: Operating
- Type: Observation tower
- Location: Las Vegas, Nevada, U.S., 2000 South Las Vegas Boulevard
- Coordinates: 36.147386°N 115.155389°W
- Groundbreaking: November 5, 1991
- Construction started: February 1992
- Topped-out: November 4, 1995
- Opened: April 30, 1996
- Cost: US$70 million

Height
- Antenna spire: 1,149 ft (350.2 m)

Design and construction
- Architect: Ned Baldwin
- Developer: Bob Stupak
- Other information
- No. of rooms: 2,427
- Gaming space: 80,000 sq ft (7,400 m^{2})
- Permanent shows: Viva Las Vegas (1996–2006); American Superstars (1996–2011); Bite (2004–12); Pin Up (2013–17); MJ Live; Celestia (2019–20); Rouge
- Signature attractions: Big Shot; Insanity (2005–2023); X-Scream; SkyJump; High Roller (1996–2005)
- Notable restaurants: Top of the World; McCall's Heartland Grill; PT's Wings & Sports; Roxy's Diner (1996–2018); Strat Café; 108 Eats
- Casino type: Land-based
- Owner: Vici Properties
- Operating license holder: Golden Entertainment
- Previous names: Vegas World (1979–1995); Stratosphere (1996–2020)
- Renovated in: 2000–01, 2004, 2010–12, 2018–20, 2023
- Website: thestrat.com

The Strat (Note: Stylized as "The STRAT".) (formerly the Stratosphere) is a hotel and casino in Las Vegas, Nevada, United States. It includes a 1,149-foot-tall (350 m) observation tower, the tallest in the United States. It is also the second-tallest observation tower in the Western Hemisphere, surpassed only by the CN Tower in Toronto, Ontario. The top of the tower includes a revolving restaurant, lounges, observation decks, and several thrill rides. The hotel and casino are at the base of the tower, and the resort also includes a showroom and a shopping mall. The Strat is within city limits on Las Vegas Boulevard, just north of the Las Vegas Strip. The resort is sometimes considered a Strip property, but Clark County does not officially recognize it as such, saying the Strip does not extend into the city.

Part of the property was previously occupied by Vegas World, a hotel and casino Bob Stupak opened in 1979. A decade after its opening, Stupak announced plans for a giant neon sign for Vegas World, to be built on adjacent property. The idea soon evolved into an observation tower with a rooftop restaurant. Construction of the Stratosphere Tower began in 1992. A fire of unknown origin occurred on the tower in August 1993, during construction. Stupak then had difficulty acquiring funds to finish the tower. To complete the project, he partnered with Grand Casinos, owned by his poker friend Lyle Berman.

The tower was originally proposed with a height of 1,012 ft (308 m). But in 1994, Stupak considered extending the height to 1,825 ft (556 m), seeking the title of tallest free-standing structure in the world. The Federal Aviation Administration opposed the new height, and the city ultimately rejected it, but allowed Stupak to go as high as 1,149 ft (350 m). Vegas World closed on February 1, 1995, and its hotel towers were remodeled to serve as the hotel for the Stratosphere. New hotel towers were built to accompany the existing buildings. The observation tower, which cost $70 million to build, was topped off on November 4, 1995.

The $550 million Stratosphere complex opened on April 30, 1996. Parts of the resort were unfinished at the time, including a hotel tower and sections of the shopping mall. The Stratosphere was built in a crime-ridden neighborhood known as Naked City. The resort struggled financially during its first year for a number of reasons, including its location away from the Strip and other resorts. Marketing was also limited, as Berman initially believed the tower had generated enough publicity on its own. The unfinished facilities were another factor in the resort's low revenue.

Stratosphere Corporation filed for Chapter 11 bankruptcy in 1997, and businessman Carl Icahn purchased the resort in 1998. Icahn had the remaining hotel rooms finished in 2001 as part of a $65 million renovation project. The resort became profitable under his ownership by targeting value-conscious visitors. In 2004, ownership was transferred to Icahn's company, American Casino & Entertainment Properties (ACEP). Whitehall Street Real Estate Funds purchased ACEP and the Stratosphere in 2008. Two years later, ACEP carried out a $20 million renovation that included remodeling the hotel rooms. Other renovations continued into 2012. Golden Entertainment purchased ACEP and the Stratosphere in 2017, and additional renovations began in 2018, continuing into 2020. The resort was rebranded as The Strat on January 22, 2020.

== History ==
In 1974, Bob Stupak opened a small casino in Las Vegas known as Bob Stupak's World Famous Million-Dollar Historic Gambling Museum and Casino, north of the Las Vegas Strip on land previously occupied by the Todkill/Bill Hayden Lincoln Mercury Dealership. The casino burned down two months later, and Stupak opened his Vegas World hotel and casino on the same property in 1979.

=== Conception ===
Stupak's concept for the Stratosphere began as a plan to construct a 1,012-foot (308 m) neon sign tower for Vegas World. In October 1989, Stupak submitted plans to the city for the approval of the neon sign tower, which would stand four times taller than the hotel. A few days later, he withdrew his plans to allow time for a revised version of the tower that would include an elevator leading up to an observation deck. Stupak, who wanted the tower to become a local landmark, said, "What I'm trying to do for Las Vegas is what the Eiffel Tower did for Paris, what the Empire State Building did for New York, what the Seattle Space Needle did for Seattle." Stupak's plans received widespread opposition, including from Las Vegas city staff, who drafted an ordinance that would have limited signs to 35 feet. The Las Vegas City Council rejected the ordinance, considering it a poorly drawn measure aimed specifically at stopping Stupak's project.

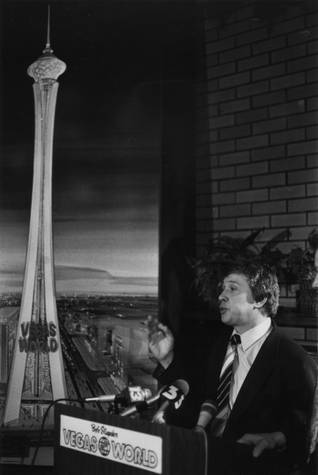
Stupak discussing the project, c. 1990

In February 1990, Stupak unveiled his revised plans for a $50 million, 1,012-foot (308 m) observation tower with a top floor that would include a revolving restaurant and four penthouse suites. It would be the tallest structure in Las Vegas and in Nevada. The tower was designed by architect Ned Baldwin, who also worked on the CN Tower in Toronto. Stupak's vision for the project was inspired by the Sydney Tower in Australia, where he once lived. In April 1990, the city council approved Stupak's tower, despite objections from the Federal Aviation Administration (FAA), which said it was 200 feet (61 m) too tall. Nellis Air Force Base also opposed the tower. Stupak later said that "all sorts of people out there opposed" the tower, adding, "If it wasn't for the courage of the council, it would have never been built." Critics later called the project the "eighth blunder of the world" and "Stupak's shaft."

In October 1991, the city approved the tower's base and shaft; the pod atop the tower had yet to be approved. At the time, Stupak was trying to obtain financing for the now-$100 million project and was also under investigation by gaming officials over allegations that he used deceptive advertising to lure customers to Vegas World. The project was now planned to include the "world's first indoor African lion's park", consisting of a jungle habitat at the tower base; this feature was eventually scrapped.

Groundbreaking for the project, known as the Stratosphere Tower, took place on November 5, 1991. The start of construction had yet to be announced for the tower, which was still opposed by the FAA.

=== Construction ===
Construction of the $32 million tower began in February 1992, on property adjacent to Vegas World. Multiple architectural and engineering firms monitored the construction to ensure structural integrity. The tower was built directly north of the Las Vegas Strip and south of downtown Las Vegas, in an area known as Meadows Village, a crime-ridden neighborhood nicknamed Naked City. Shortly before its opening, a Stratosphere spokesman said, "We hope Stratosphere will be the catalyst that spurs redevelopment" in the area, while acknowledging, "We plunked down a half-billion-dollar project in the middle of one of the worst neighborhoods."

On August 29, 1993, around midnight, hundreds of customers at Vegas World were evacuated when the half-finished tower caught on fire. No one was hurt. The cause of the fire was never determined. Parts of the tower were blackened, but the fire caused no structural damage. The tower is made of concrete and steel. The fire delayed the opening, which had been planned for August 1994, by eight weeks. Stupak said the tower's first phase would still be ready in time with an accelerated construction schedule. A large crane atop the tower, used for construction, was also damaged in the fire. The next month, high winds prevented the scheduled dismantling of the crane, a process expected to take two days.

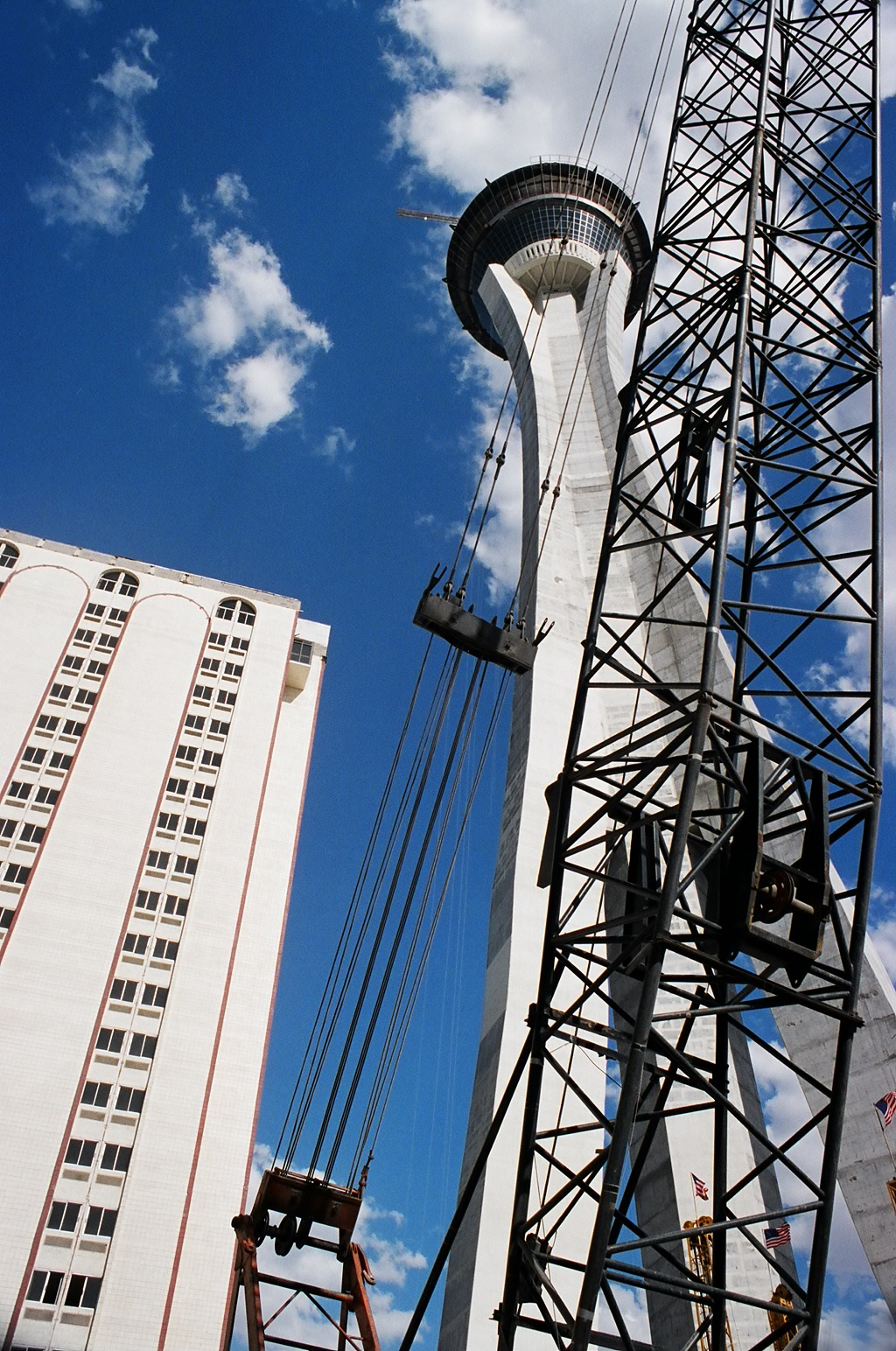
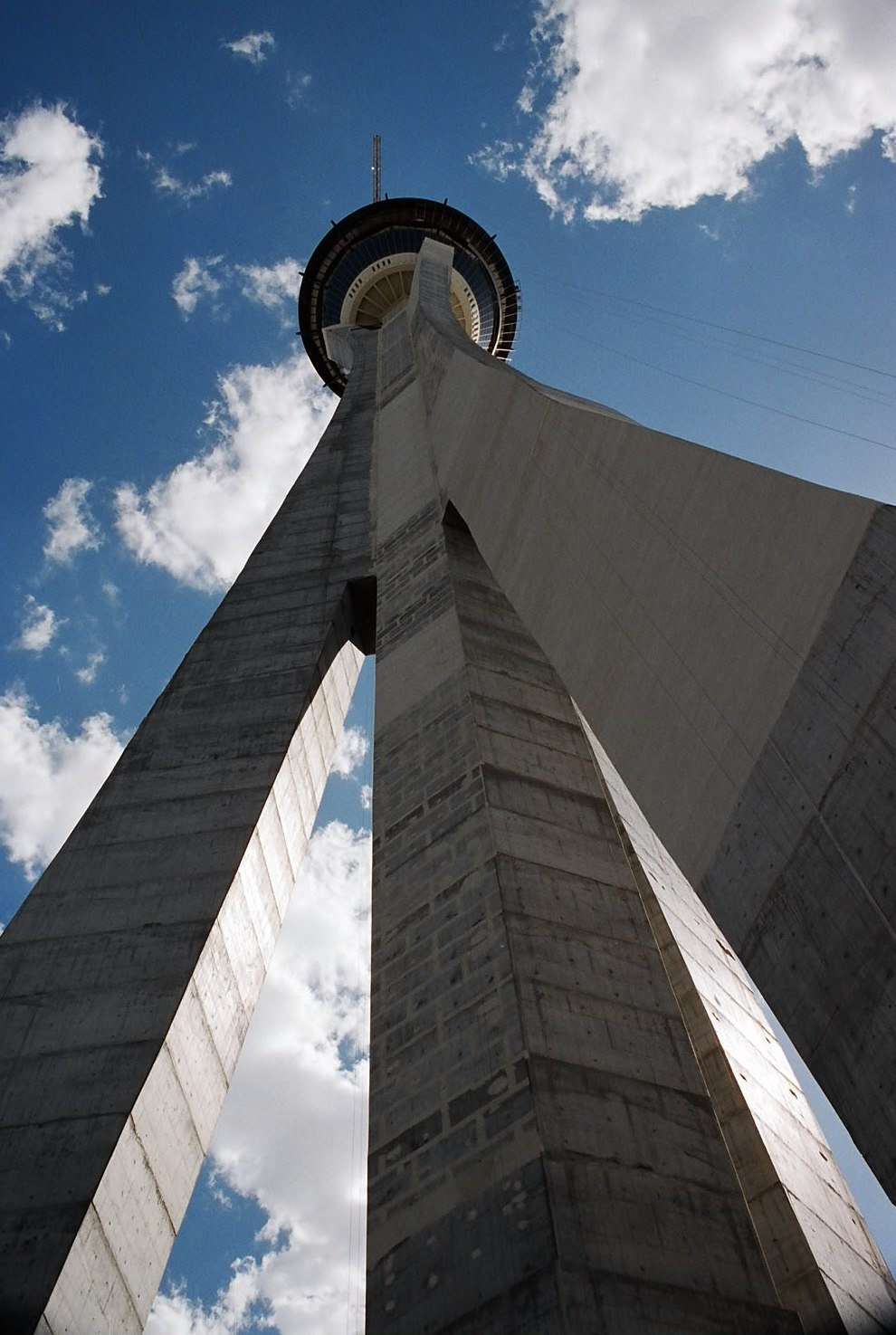
Tower construction in 1995, with a Vegas World hotel tower to the left

After the fire, Stupak had trouble financing the completion of the tower. To continue construction, Grand Casinos announced plans in November 1993 to purchase 33% of the Stratosphere and Vegas World by acquiring shares in Stupak's Stratosphere Corporation. Grand Casinos, owned by Stupak's poker friend Lyle Berman, ultimately purchased a 43% stake in the resort.

As construction continued in April 1994, the tower was over 700 feet (210 m) tall. That month, Stupak announced that he was considering an 813-foot (248 m) extension of the tower's height, which would bring it to 1,825 feet (556 m), beating the CN Tower by 10 feet (3.0 m) and making the Stratosphere the tallest structure in the world. This new height was opposed by the FAA, the Airline Pilots Association, and McCarran International Airport, on the grounds that it would force changes in air traffic patterns. The FAA said the tower would be an aviation hazard, but its developers argued that the height would make it a major tourist attraction.

Stupak and Grand Casinos developed a laser light show for the tower in case the city rejected the new height. A lawyer for the project said, "If we can't have the world's tallest tower, we'll have the world's most beautiful tower." The FAA also opposed the laser show, citing previous incidents around the country in which pilots were temporarily blinded by laser lights. In June 1994, the city rejected Stupak's new height proposal but allowed him to go up to 1,149 feet (350 m), higher than 1,012 feet (308 m) he had originally proposed. The tower was ultimately built out to the city's maximum height, though the FAA still considered it a hazard.

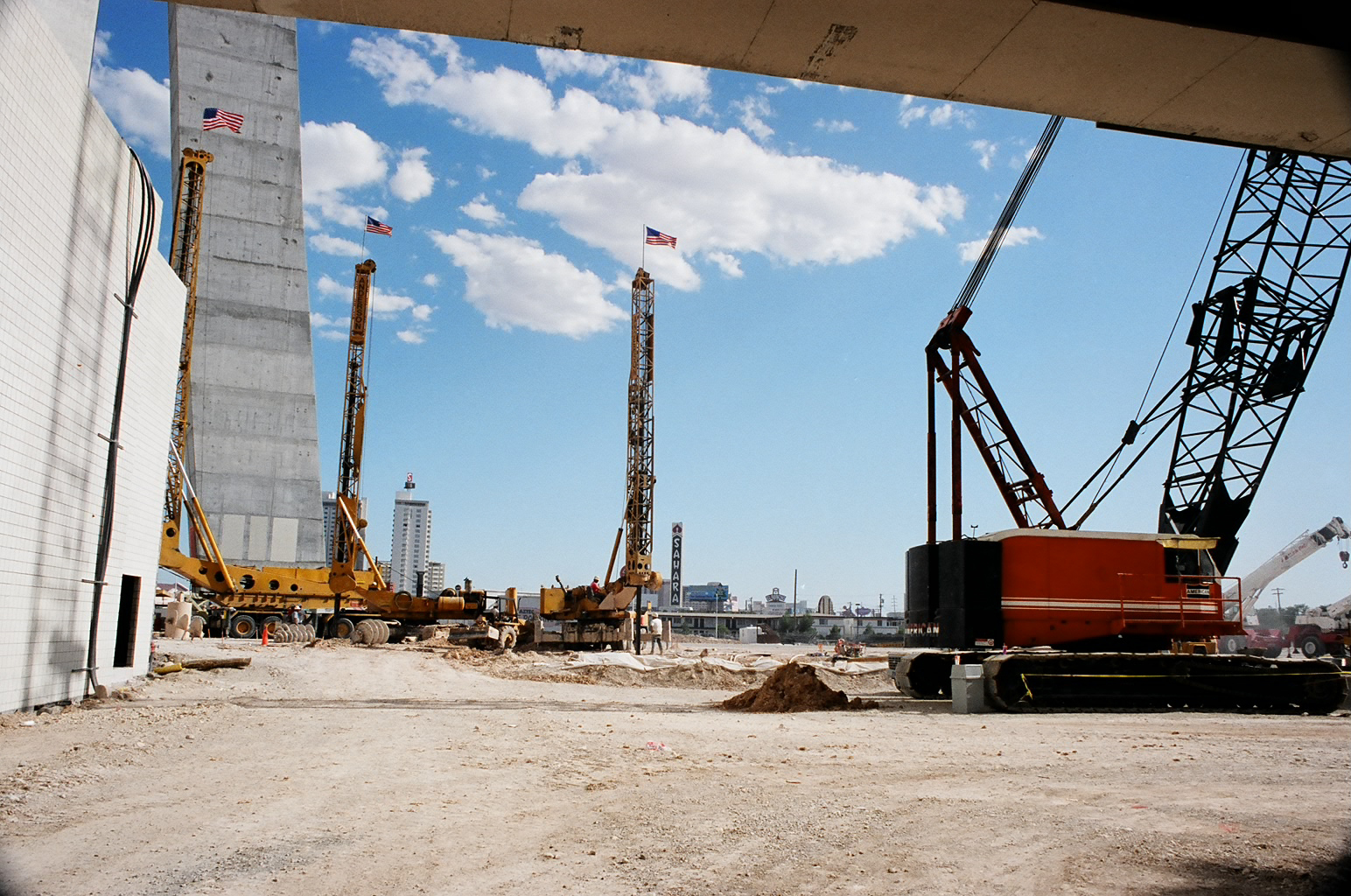
Construction at the foot of the tower (1995)

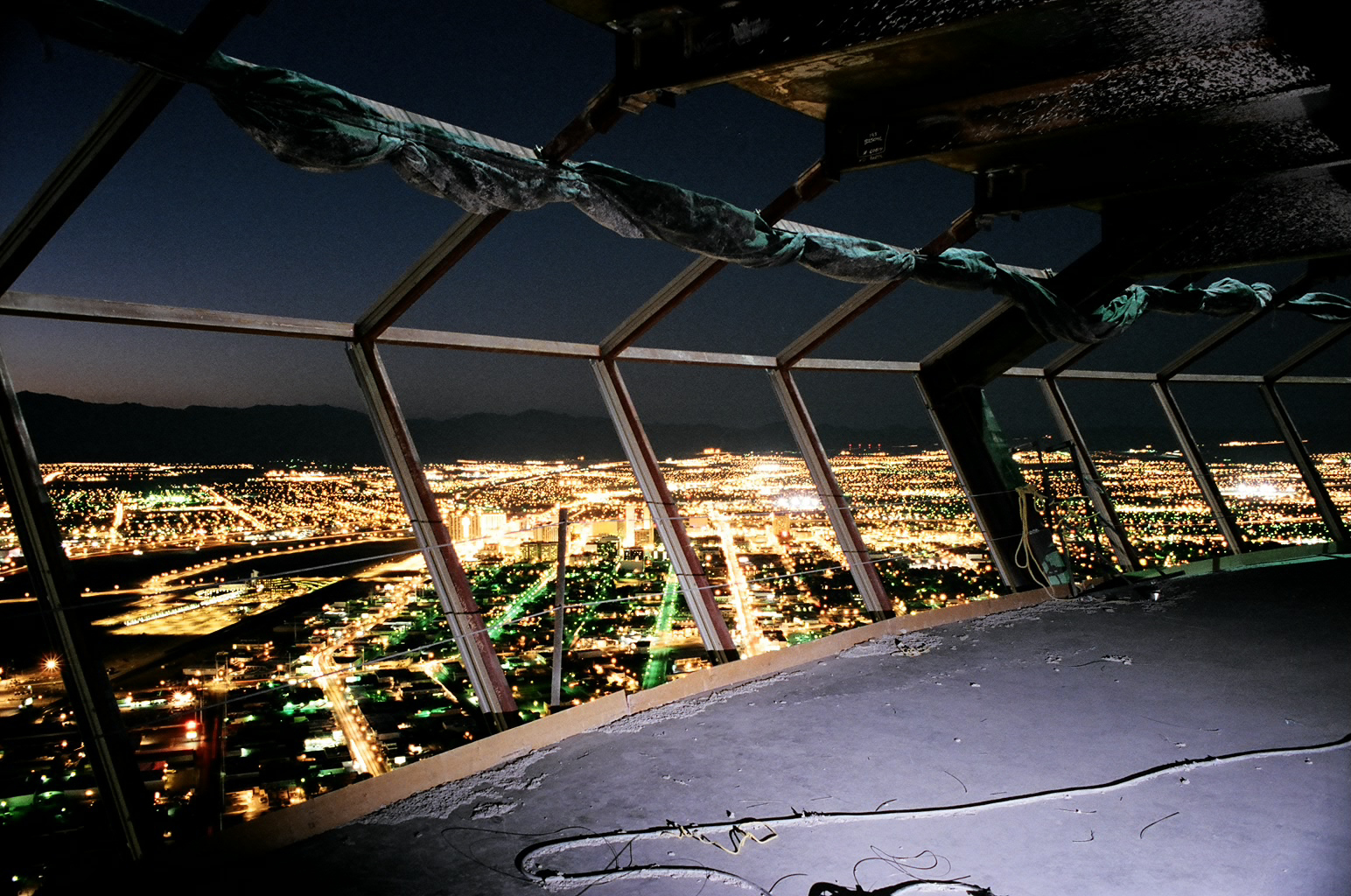
Tower pod during construction (September 1995)

Grand Casinos completed its purchase of Vegas World at the end of 1994, and the hotel-casino closed on February 1, 1995, for remodeling to be integrated into the resort. Vegas World's two hotel towers, consisting of 932 rooms, were renovated to become part of the Stratosphere. A month after the closure, Stratosphere Corporation began selling bonds worth $203 million. The company hoped to raise money to finish the tower and pay Stupak the $50.8 million purchase price for Vegas World. Stupak's critics did not believe he could complete the tower, in part because of his controversial promotional tactics at Vegas World. Critics had also believed that completion would be unlikely after the 1993 fire and the FAA's opposition. After a 1995 motorcycle accident left Stupak in a coma for 12 days, he said the controversy and "all the complaining" about the tower stopped: "There were people who didn't like the tower, this and that, but after the accident, it was like nobody had anything negative to say about it."

During 1994, crews erected a crane—taller than the earlier one—that allowed them to continue work on the tower. The 75-ton crane was 400 feet (120 m) tall and was installed over four days. Removal of the crane began in October 1995, with the use of a second crane. Dismantling the crane was one of the most significant challenges for those working on the tower. The tower pod's unique design and its limited space required construction crews to carefully plan the installation of the second crane, which weighed 30 tons. The second crane lowered pieces of the original crane to the ground, and then lifted a seven-ton derrick into place, allowing workers to carry down sections of the second crane. The derrick was then disassembled by hand, and workers used a construction elevator to bring down the pieces. The complex and risky process was expected to take nearly two months. The tower was topped off with a ceremony on November 4, 1995. A helicopter was used to lift two 3,700-pound (1,700 kg) steel frames to the top. Six workers, strapped to the tower, helped guide the final sections into place.

Years before the Stratosphere's opening, a three-block neighborhood of houses in Meadows Village was demolished to make room for the resort's 4,500-space parking garage. In 1994, officials from the Stratosphere project—north of the Aztec Inn motel-casino—agreed with the city's Las Vegas Redevelopment Agency to have the Aztec Inn's parking lot condemned through eminent domain and turned over to the Stratosphere. The Aztec Inn opposed the agreement, and in 1995 a judge ruled it unconstitutional. By April 1996, the Aztec Inn settled with the Stratosphere and agreed to sell its parking lot.

Separately, the Stratosphere agreed to provide free rent and relocation expenses to approximately 140 residents in a nearby area of Meadows Village that was cleared for an eventual expansion of the resort. An additional hotel tower had been planned for the land, directly north of the resort; 1.5 acres (0.0061 km^{2}) were already occupied by several businesses, and this portion of the land was to be seized through eminent domain, but three property owners fought the seizure in a court battle that lasted into the next decade. The proposed expansion never took place.

=== Opening ===
The Stratosphere was expected to employ 3,000 people, and began hiring for the remaining 2,400 employees in March 1996, a month before the opening. At the time, Stupak was the chairman of Stratosphere Corporation and owned 17% of the company. He was one of the corporation's nine directors, and would not oversee the company's daily operations.

Shortly before its opening, several daredevils expressed interest in performing stunts from the top of the tower, but they were declined for safety reasons. Smoke in the tower's pod restaurant forced an evacuation of workers on April 25, 1996, days before the opening. The smoke came from the pod's fifth-floor kitchen, one floor above the restaurant, due to a faulty ventilator in the air-flow duct system. The pod contained four tanks with 32,000 gallons of water for firefighters in the event of a fire, but they were not needed.

A film crew followed Stupak all day leading up to the opening. More than 8,000 VIP guests visited the resort for a premiere party on April 29, hours before its midnight opening. Stupak attended the event with singer Phyllis McGuire. Other attendees included Nevada governor Bob Miller and Las Vegas mayor Jan Laverty Jones. Media from around the world attended the event, which was broadcast live by CNBC as well as television stations in Las Vegas and Los Angeles. A six-minute fireworks show, costing $50,000, began at 10:30 p.m. Doors in the tower's pod had been left partially open to accommodate television camera cables, and smoke from the fireworks filled the pod and set off fire alarms, resulting in the shutdown of elevators and stranding hundreds of VIP guests.

The $550 million complex featured 354,000 sq ft (32,900 m^{2}), including 140,000 sq ft (13,000 m^{2}) of entertainment and shopping space. A 97,000-square-foot (9,000 m^{2}) casino was part of the resort's first phase, which also included 1,500 hotel rooms. The hotel was expected to open on May 7. Another 1,000 hotel rooms were expected to be finished in November as part of the second phase.

The resort had 3,100 employees. The casino had 2,600 slot machines and was decorated with a world's fair theme and bright colors. The casino was divided into three sections, each with its own international theme. The hotel included a bronze statue of Stupak, which he disliked and never approved, saying, "They spent $100,000 more for that statue than I spent to open my first place in 1974." Another statue, in the center of the casino, featured a couple riding a dolphin set upon a bronze globe. The Stratosphere had seven restaurants, and the top of the tower contained two thrill rides. Stupak said, "Anybody can build a tower. But if you build a tower and put a roller coaster on top—now, that's Las Vegatizing."

=== Financial problems ===
The Stratosphere was projected to attract at least 5.5 million visitors in its first year. Around the time of its opening, financial analysts were optimistic about its financial prospects. Revenue for the first five weeks was lower than expected. Stratosphere Corporation attributed the low results to the resort being partly unfinished, and said it would borrow $48.5 million from Grand Casinos to finance enhancements to the property, including the completion of the 1,000 additional rooms and the opening of unfinished retail shops. The resort's location away from the revitalized downtown and the mega-resorts of the Strip was another reason for its financial problems.

In addition, customer visitation to the tower was lower than expected, and many people did not stay to gamble in the casino. The casino was poorly designed, according to managers, as visitors to the tower were able to avoid the casino floor entirely. Berman said that weak marketing was also a factor in the poor revenue. Because the tower had already received so much publicity, Berman decided that a full marketing campaign was unnecessary. In the months after its opening, the resort continued to suffer financially. The unfinished hotel contained fewer rooms than most Las Vegas resorts, and occupancy was significantly below average for such a property. Another issue was that the two rides atop the tower had to be shut down whenever winds reached 35 miles per hour.

Stupak, who had already planned to move on to other projects, resigned as chairman less than three months after the opening, leaving Berman in charge. Explaining his departure, Stupak cited disagreements with a majority of the board members, saying that Grand Casinos executives ignored his advice and that he lacked influence considering his job title. Grand Casinos had agreed to keep Stupak as chairman only for the first 90 days after opening; his position was to be evaluated after that. Stupak's statue was removed after he resigned and displayed in a gambling museum at the Tropicana hotel-casino.

In August 1996, Leroy's established a temporary race and sports book in an effort to bring in more gamblers. The resort's second phase was halted later that month for financial reasons; the additional hotel building consisted of an unfinished 15-story structure of concrete and rebar. There had also been plans for a $30 million aquarium attraction, measuring 80,000 sq ft (7,400 m^{2}) and set to open in 1997, but this never materialized.

Within six months of the opening, stock prices in Grand Casinos and Stratosphere Corporation dropped 50% and 80% respectively, and the resort laid off 400 employees. In an effort to attract more gamblers, the casino began offering favorable odds and returns on its table games and slots. The effort was part of a $1.4 million multimedia marketing campaign, and the plan was initially successful. The resort lost $254 million during 1996, but revenue improved during the final three months of the year thanks to the marketing program, which focused on gaming rather than the observation tower. In addition, admission prices for the tower and its rides were reduced. A roller coaster atop the tower was considered underwhelming, and was closed for improvements to make it longer and faster.

Nevertheless, the Stratosphere continued to struggle. In January 1997, the resort announced that it could no longer afford to honor thousands of prepaid vacation packages. Stratosphere Corporation filed for Chapter 11 bankruptcy later that month after missing a $14.5 million interest payment to bondholders. Under the reorganization plan, the resort continued to operate. Existing shares in the company were canceled, and shareholders instead were given the right to buy stock in the company after its restructuring. Shareholders were upset by the plan, and some had already filed a class action lawsuit against Stratosphere Corporation and Grand Casinos, alleging deceit. In February 1997, people who had bought the vacation packages also sued Stupak and Grand Casinos.

Before the bankruptcy filing, Berman had intended to make the resort profitable. Stupak had called Berman "the best casino operator in the world," but later said of Grand Casinos' operation of the resort, "They just weren't up to it." The resort continued to perform poorly during early 1997, in part because of competition with the recently opened New York-New York resort. Rainy and windy weather was another factor, reducing pedestrian traffic to the Stratosphere and interest in the tower's observation deck and roller coaster. Because of the low revenue, Stratosphere Corporation was removed from the NASDAQ in April 1997, though the stock continued to be traded through the OTC Bulletin Board. A new reorganization plan was submitted that would cancel all existing stock, thereby excluding shareholders' right to buy stock in a restructured company.

=== Carl Icahn ownership ===
In June 1997, corporate raider and businessman Carl Icahn purchased 20 percent of mortgage bonds in Stratosphere Corporation, while Berman and other investors in Stratosphere Corporation sold off their shares. Grand Casinos remained as the largest shareholder in the resort. In July 1997, Icahn announced plans to sell shares in his company, American Real Estate Partners, to raise money to purchase the Stratosphere entirely. Icahn announced a new reorganization plan that was viewed more favorably than the latest one proposed by Grand Casinos. Berman and other board members of Stratosphere Corporation resigned, with Berman saying, "Grand wants to avoid being on the board when proposals such as Icahn's are being reviewed. I think it's difficult when your company has a proposal and another company is offering a better proposal."

In August 1997, Stupak made a plan to regain control of the Stratosphere by purchasing $1 million in mortgage notes. He also planned to air a half-hour video in which he criticized the board members who resigned, saying, "We have to save the Stratosphere. We have to save the shareholders. You have a duty, a fiduciary duty. I'm reminding you to do this." Stupak went on to say, "They lost more money than I ever heard of. So what did they do? They surrendered. They surrendered and left town." Stupak was also critical of Stratosphere Corporation for refusing to meet with him to discuss his own proposal for reorganization. A day after announcing his video, Stupak decided to shelve its airing, stating that he had already caught people's interest. He said the video was no longer necessary and that the timing no longer felt right. In October 1997, Grand Casinos confirmed that it would have no further involvement in the Stratosphere and its reorganization.

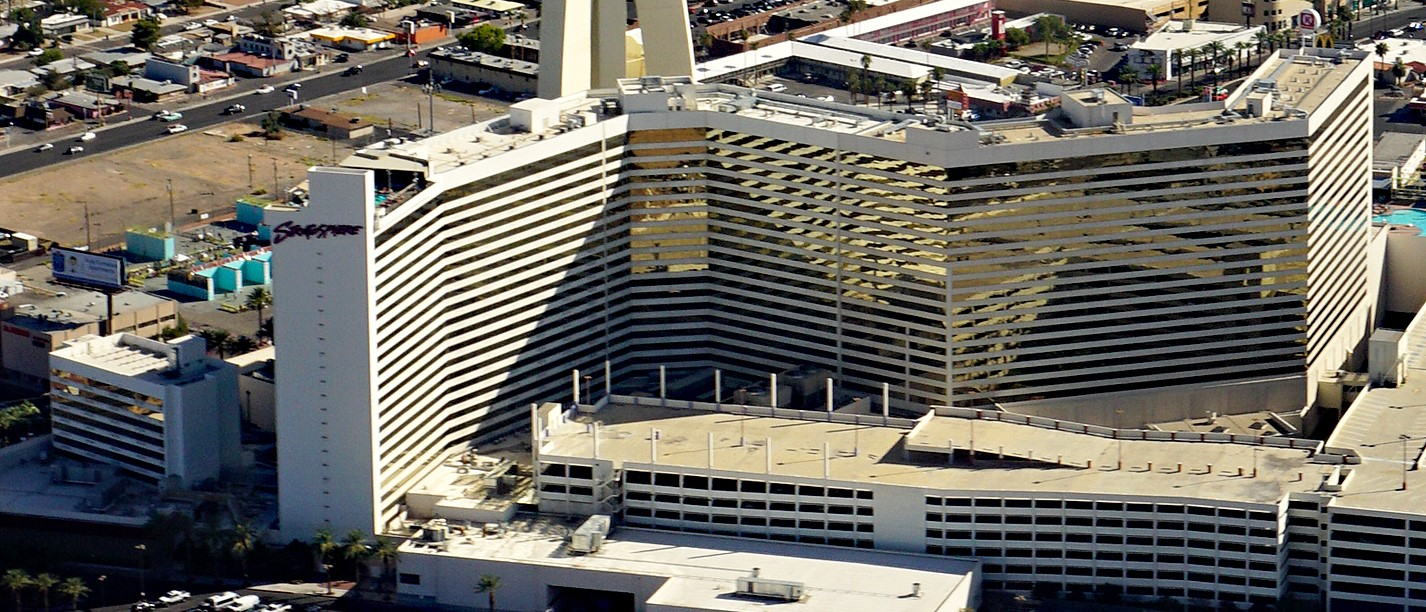
The property's hotel towers in 2017. See here for notes about each structure.

The Stratosphere owed $313 million to creditors. Icahn's reorganization plan was approved, and Stupak settled the lawsuit concerning vacation packages. Older shares in the Stratosphere were canceled. Lakes Gaming, formerly Grand Casinos, would later settle a lawsuit brought by former Stratosphere shareholders, and the company prevailed in a lawsuit brought by bondholders of the resort. Icahn's purchase received final approval from the Nevada Gaming Commission in August 1998, and the Stratosphere exited bankruptcy two months later. Icahn planned $100 million in improvements, including the completion of the additional hotel rooms. However, he inherited various lawsuits when he purchased the Stratosphere, and construction would not resume until such issues were resolved.

In the years after Icahn took over, Stupak sometimes visited the Stratosphere's Top of the World restaurant but was otherwise uninterested in the resort. In 2001, Stupak said that he felt prouder when he opened his earlier casinos on the site in 1974 and 1979. Stupak stated his biggest disappointment with the Stratosphere was not being able to have it built out to 1,825 feet. He said, "I don't want to be the guy who built a tall tower in Las Vegas. I want to be the guy who built the tallest structure in the world."

In 1999, ownership switched to American Real Estate Partners, and Icahn remained as the controlling investor. A new 5,000-square-foot (460 m^{2}) sportsbook was added that year. Revenue saw improvement in 2000, and approximately 8,000 people visited the tower daily. The resort had 2,200 employees.

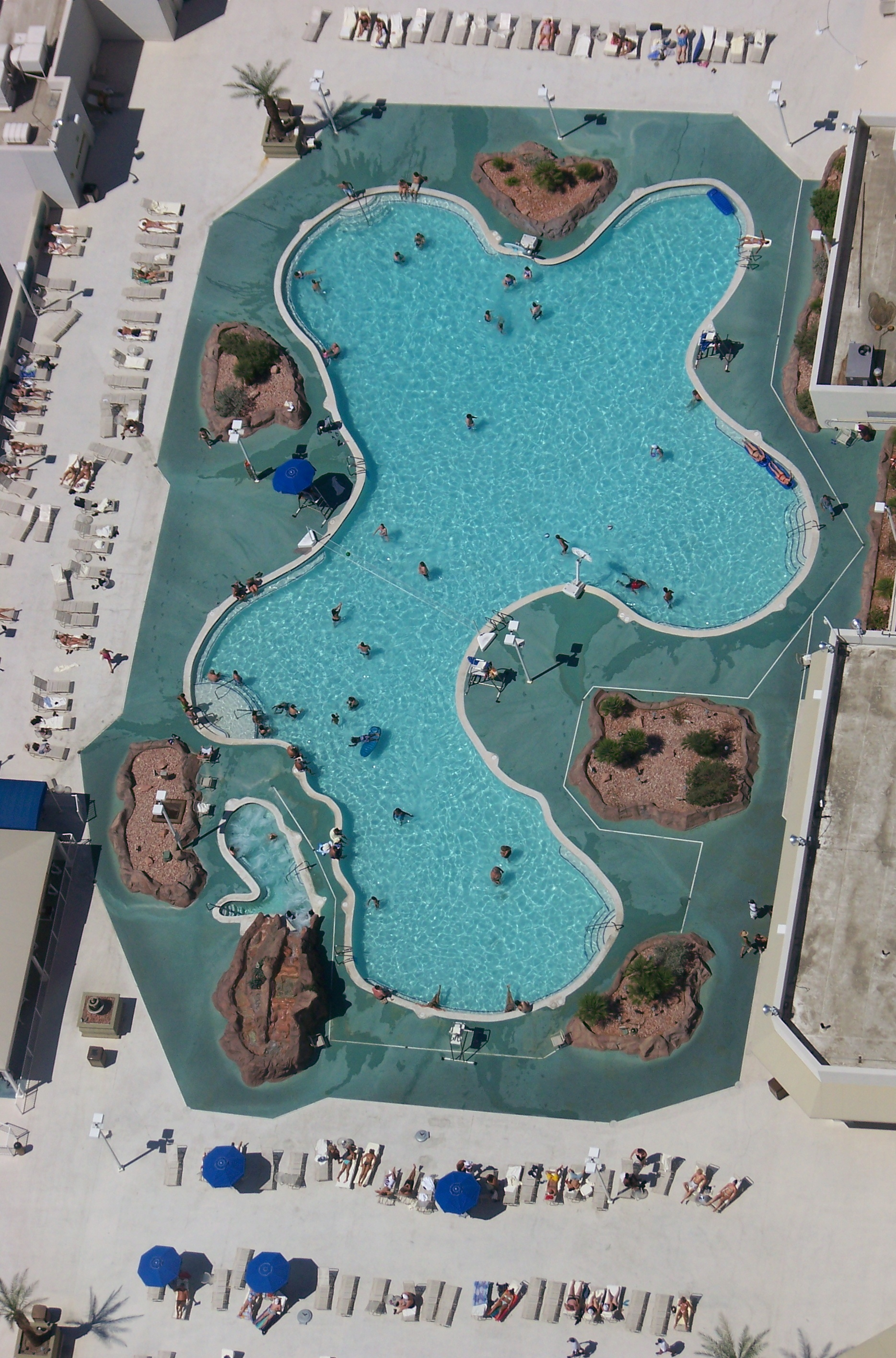
Eighth-floor pool area in 2007

Construction of the unfinished hotel tower resumed on April 14, 2000. The tower, with 24 stories, was topped off on November 2, 2000. The $65 million project included 1,002 rooms, a 67,000-square-foot (6,200 m^{2}) pool and recreation area, and a coffee shop. Excluding the new tower, the hotel had 1,444 rooms. The new project was meant to improve business at the casino and its retail mall, the Tower Shops. The new facilities were opened in mid-2001. The casino floor was brightened and the resort's buffet was expanded as part of the renovation project.

Icahn planned for the Stratosphere to target value-conscious visitors. Focusing on this demographic, Icahn turned the Stratosphere into a profitable business. The hotel's room rates were among the lowest for a Las Vegas resort. The casino's poker room was closed in early 2001, as it was not a significant source of revenue, and it conflicted with the renovation plans. In 2001, the tower was temporarily closed following the September 11 attacks, out of concern that it could be a target for terrorists.

In 2003, several additions were being considered, including a convention center, a nightclub, and an indoor go-cart track. In 2004, ownership of the Stratosphere was transferred to Icahn's new company, American Casino & Entertainment Properties (ACEP). Refurbishments were underway on its sign, porte-cochère, and valet area. The resort also opened a topless pool area on the hotel's 25th floor known as Beach Club 25, later renamed Radius. The Beach Club 25 area had previously served as the resort's original pool, until the 2001 renovation. The topless pool concept was introduced to appeal to the Stratosphere's European visitors, and to attract a younger demographic that had become increasingly common in Las Vegas. The topless pool area operates in addition to a separate, non-topless pool on the hotel's eighth floor.

Like other resorts, the Stratosphere was particularly popular in 2006 and 2007, before the 2008 financial crisis. A retro-themed nightclub, named Polly Esther's, opened in March 2007. It featured themes based on the past four decades, with memorabilia dating back to the 1970s.

=== 2008 sale and renovations ===
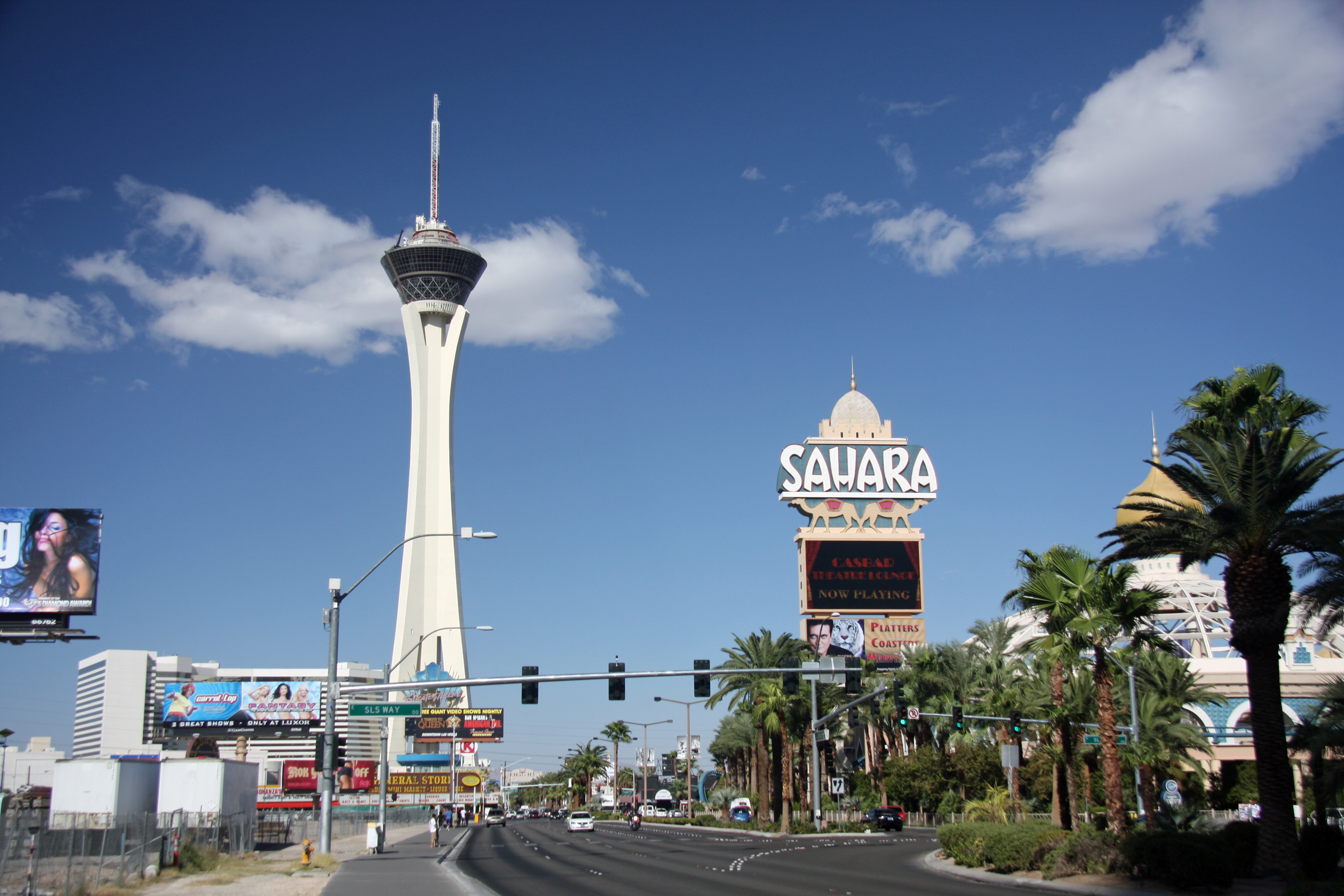
The Stratosphere, located up the street from the Sahara (2009)

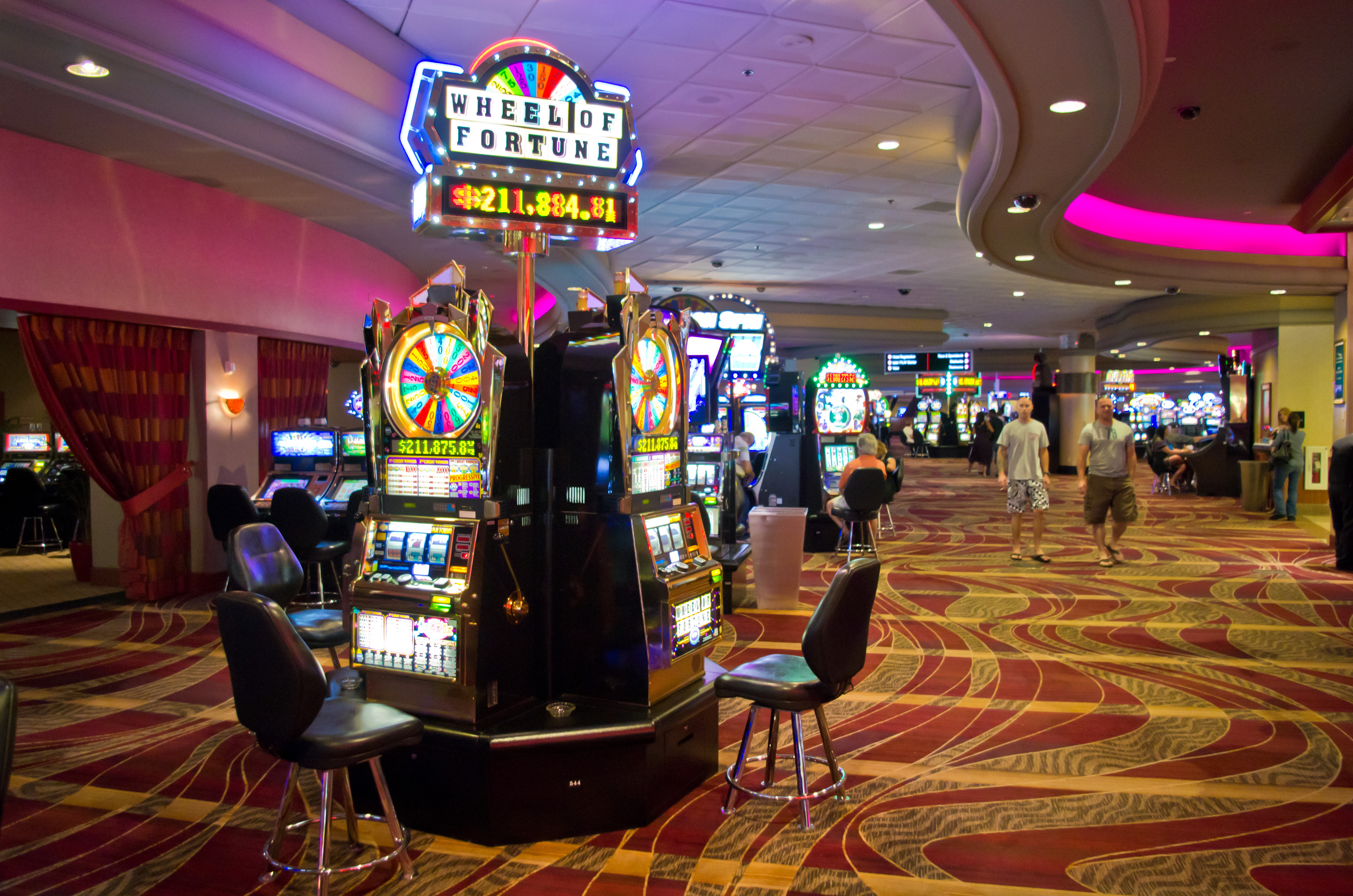

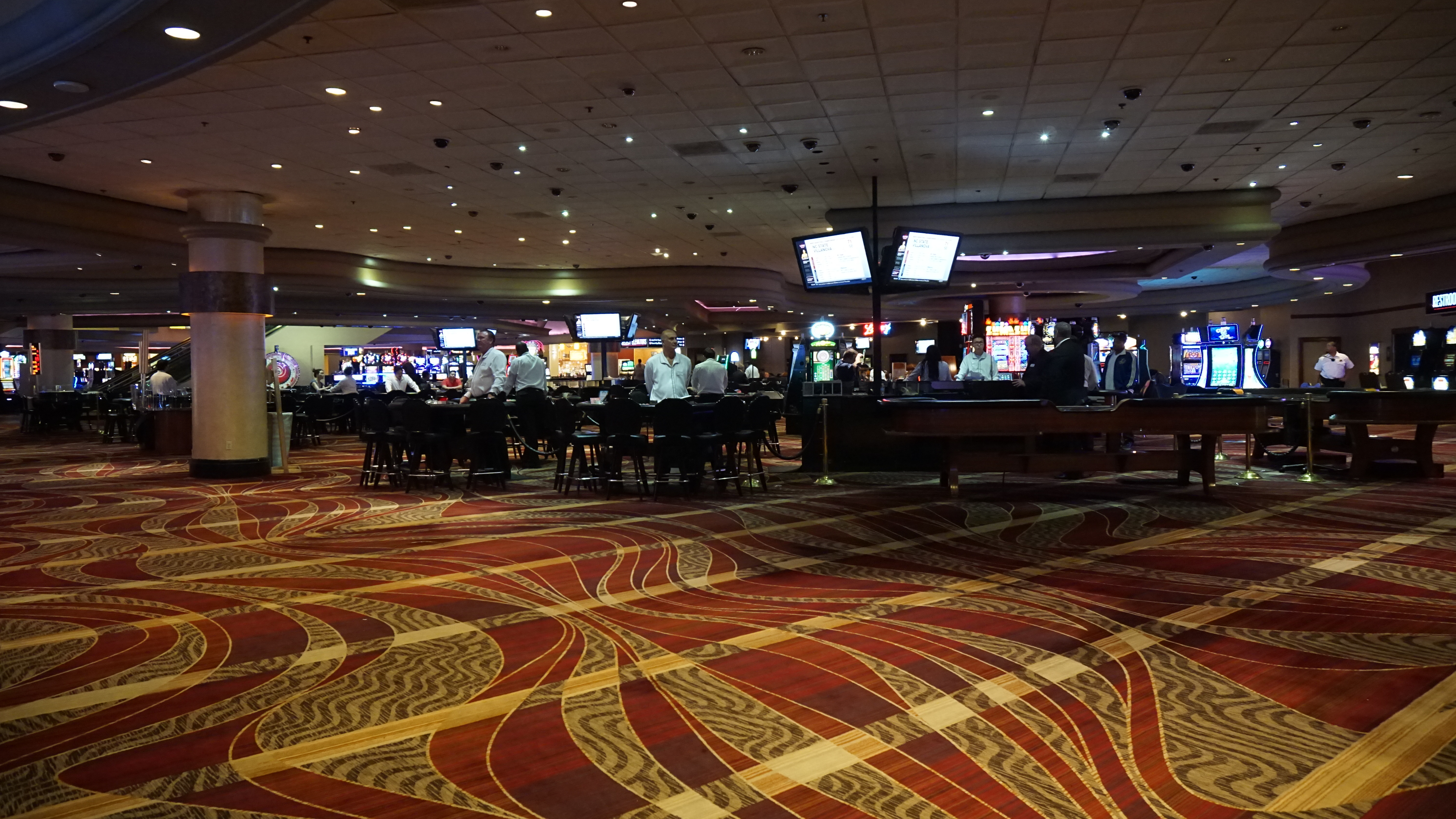
Casino floor after the 2010 renovation

In April 2007, Icahn announced that he would sell ACEP and its properties, including the Stratosphere, to a Goldman Sachs affiliate known as Whitehall Street Real Estate Funds. The sale included 17 acres of adjacent, undeveloped land. Whitehall completed its purchase in February 2008, and the company planned to spend $25 million on improvements to the Stratosphere.

Many managers were fired and replaced under the new ownership, despite earlier assurances that such jobs would be safe from termination. Some employees complained about the firing of their managers, which occurred following the 2008 financial crisis in the United States. Other employees stated that the fired managers were inept or stealing money from the casino, and that they showed favoritism among workers. Under the new ownership, employees were given stricter work guidelines to follow, which was met with mixed reactions from workers and gamblers. Polly Esther's closed at the end of 2008. As a result of the ensuing Great Recession, the Stratosphere laid off workers in 2009, and continued to struggle into 2010.

A $20 million renovation project began in 2010. Improvements were made to the casino, the main entrance, the Top of the World restaurant, and other areas. A major aspect of the project was the renovation of 909 hotel rooms, out of 2,427. Other renovations continued into 2012, and included the addition of a new poker room.

For years, the Stratosphere sat alone as the sole resort in the area. The only other nearby resort, the Sahara, closed in 2011, causing a significant drop in pedestrian traffic for the Stratosphere. However, the Sahara reopened as the SLS Las Vegas in 2014, and the Stratosphere was expected to benefit from the increased visitation in the area. A British man became the 40 millionth visitor to the tower on April 21, 2014, and received a $2,500 prize package. In September 2014, a man, under the influence of drugs, crashed his pickup truck through the resort's front entrance and was arrested.

In 2015, the Stratosphere launched an advertising campaign targeting its middle-class clientele, while criticizing high-priced Strip resorts. The Stratosphere celebrated its 20th anniversary in 2016. At the time, the resort had 1,600 employees. Most of its clientele consisted of tourists from southern California, as well as international locations such as Canada, Germany, and Great Britain. The resort's gaming revenue had yet to fully recover from the effects of the Great Recession, although other aspects of the property performed well.

=== Golden Entertainment ===
In June 2017, Golden Entertainment agreed to purchase ACEP. Golden Entertainment's $850 million purchase of the company, including the Stratosphere, was completed in October 2017. In March 2018, Golden Entertainment announced plans for a $140 million renovation of the Stratosphere that would be completed over three phases. According to management, some people were unaware that the Stratosphere was a resort, believing it to be merely an observation tower. The renovations were aimed at raising awareness of the resort amenities. Renovations were underway later in 2018. A new gaming pit was debuted, and 300 rooms were renovated, among other changes.

On February 1, 2019, plans were announced to rename the resort as The Strat, a common nickname among local residents. The transition to The Strat began with two commercials aired locally two days later, during Super Bowl LIII. The name change would become official at a later date.

A three-piece statue, created by local artists, was installed at the resort's front entrance in April 2019. The statue consists of three stainless steel figures staring at the tower. They range in height from nine to 15 feet, with the tallest one pointing at the tower. Blake Sartini, the chairman and CEO of Golden Entertainment, said the statue was a symbol of the resort's new branding.

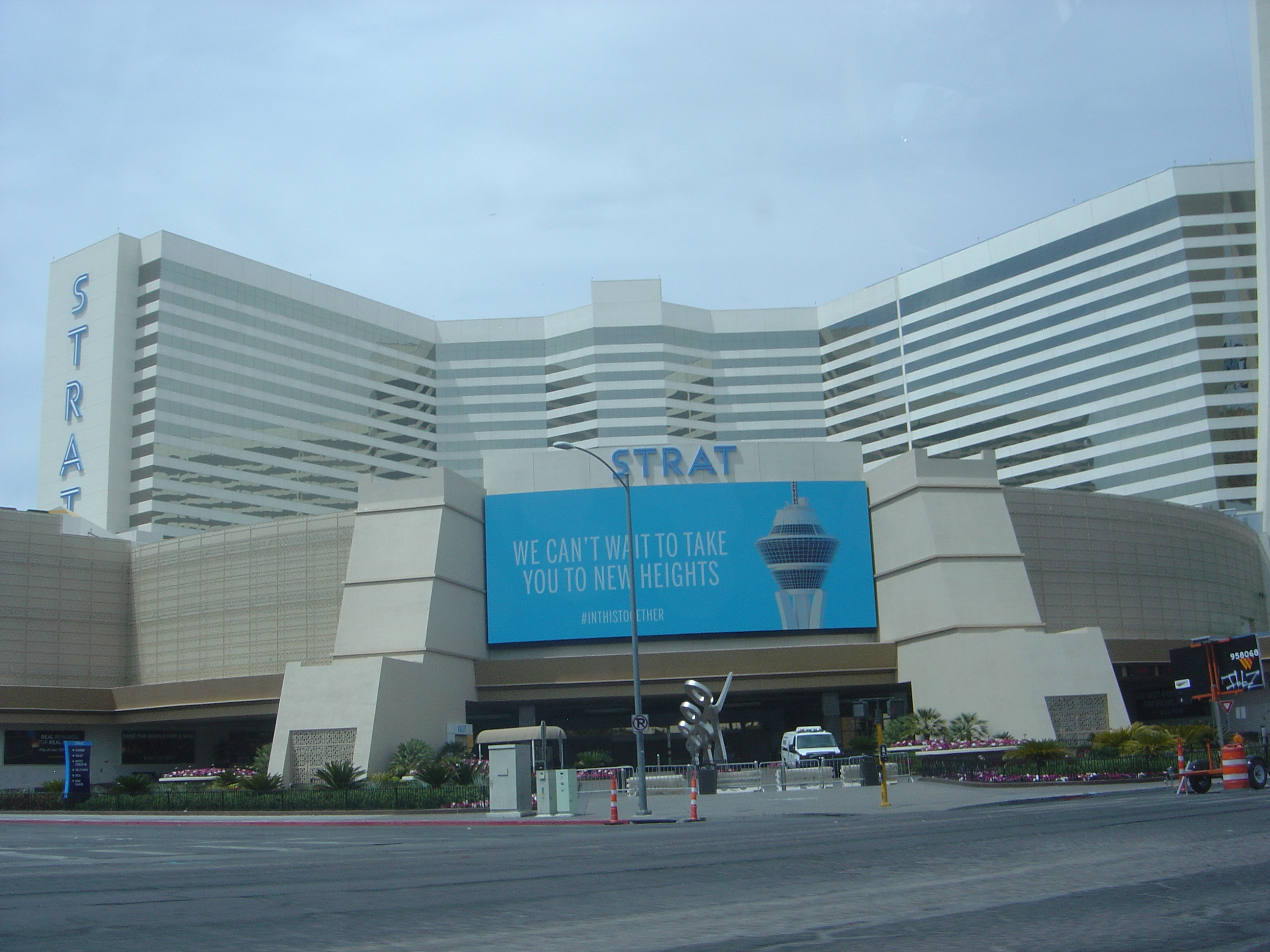
The Strat's main entrance in April 2020 during its temporary COVID-19 closure

Two areas for live entertainment – one on the casino floor and one in the former space of a lounge – were being added in June 2019, along with a new slot machine lounge. "STRAT" signage was installed in August 2019, and renovations on the south end of the casino floor were completed that year. Other renovations have included the resort's exterior and landscaping. The Strat also installed drone detection technology, alerting the property whenever illegal drones are flown near the tower.

The resort was officially renamed The Strat during a celebration held on January 22, 2020. Among the attendees to the event were Nevada governor Steve Sisolak, congresswoman Dina Titus, Sammy Hagar, Guy Fieri, and Rick Springfield. Renovations were largely finished at the time, with the exception of a self-check-in area and remodeling that was scheduled to begin on the casino's north side during the second quarter of 2020. The billboards on the tower were also renovated. Half of the resort's 2,427 hotel rooms had been remodeled, and future renovations would also take place on the remaining rooms. The 80,000-square-foot (7,400 m^{2}) casino, considered dark before, was remodeled with a new color scheme and an open layout. A new William Hill sports book was also added.

The renovations, including four new restaurants, were designed to retain customers who usually only visited the pod area. The renovation was also intended to help the property compete against nearby rivals, including the renovated Sahara and two upcoming properties: Resorts World (2021) and Fontainebleau (2023). Another renovation, focusing on 537 rooms and the pool area, was completed in 2023.

In 2026, Vici Properties acquired the real estate occupied by seven of Golden's Nevada casinos, including the Strat, which it leased back to Golden Entertainment, in a $1.16 billion transaction, as part of a Golden's transition to a privately held company.

== Property overview ==
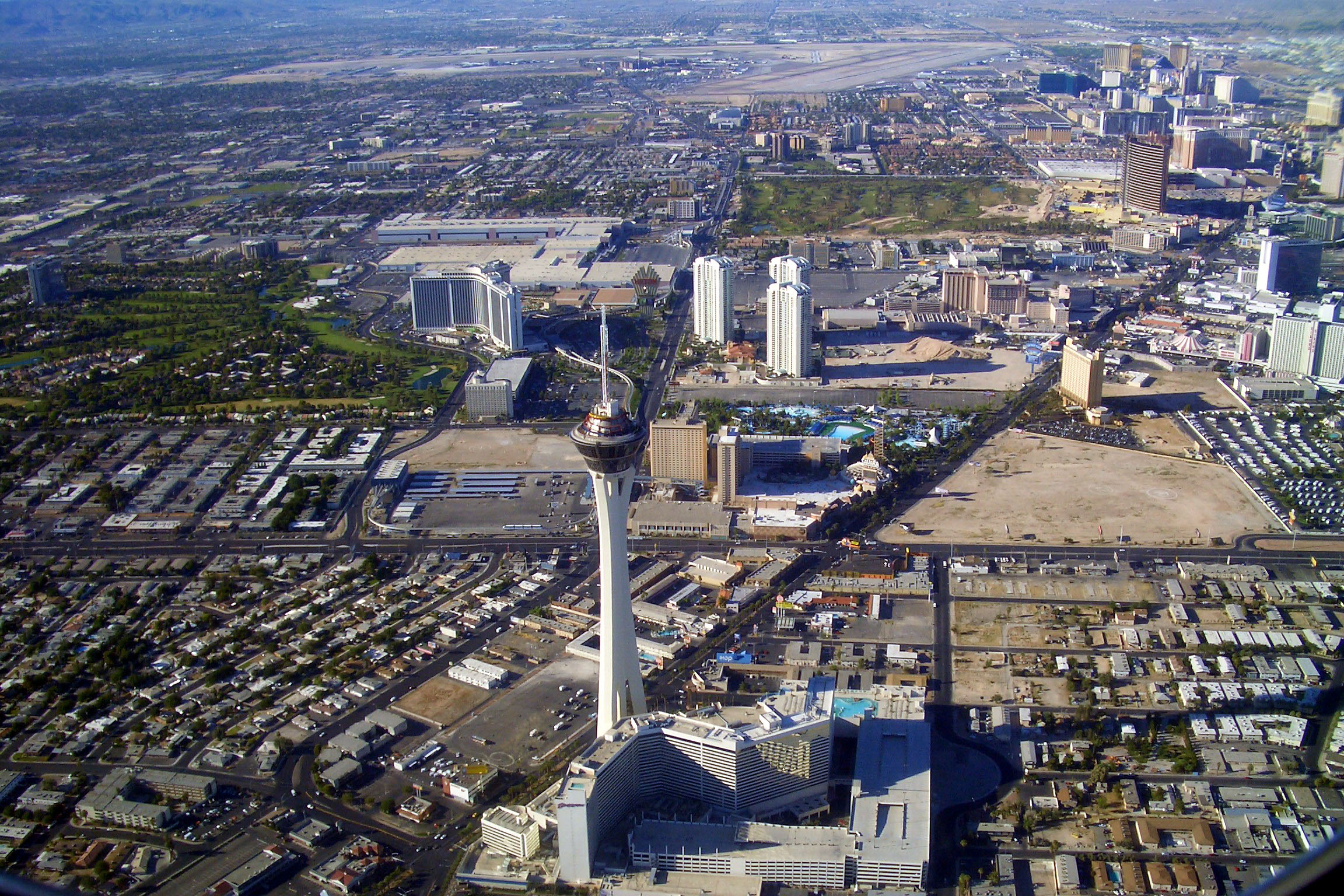
The Stratosphere in 2004, with the Strip visible in the upper right half

The hotel and casino facilities are located at the base of the observation tower. The Strat's location, in regard to the Las Vegas Strip, has been debated. Although the Stratosphere was considered north of the Strip at the time of its 1996 opening, it advertised itself as being on the Strip, with the slogan, "We define the top of the Strip." Frank Riolo, the CEO of AREP, said in 2011, "It's not Downtown, it's not the Strip and it's not a locals property. We try to run it as a hybrid."

Tourists and some local residents consider the Strat to be part of the Strip, which would make it the only Strip resort within city limits. However, Clark County considers the Strat to be several blocks north of the Strip. According to the county, the Strip does not officially extend into city limits. Golden Entertainment nonetheless advertises the resort as a Strip property, as did its predecessor, Stratosphere builder Bob Stupak.

=== Observation tower ===
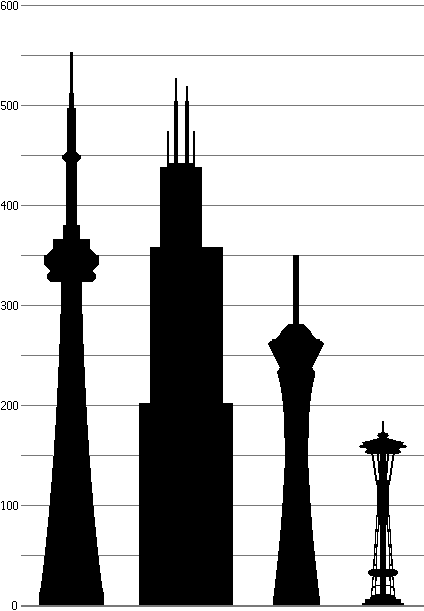
• CN Tower, Toronto • Willis Tower (formerly Sears), Chicago • Stratosphere, Las Vegas • Space Needle, Seattle

The resort was named after the stratosphere in Earth's atmosphere, as a reference to the height of the tower. At 1,149 ft (350 m), it is the tallest freestanding observation tower in the United States, and the second-tallest in the Western Hemisphere, surpassed only by the CN Tower in Toronto, Ontario. It is the tallest tower west of the Mississippi River, and also the tallest structure in Las Vegas and in the state of Nevada. Because the tower is not fully habitable, it is not considered a building, according to the Council on Tall Buildings and Urban Habitat. Because of its visibility, the tower serves as a visual aid for some motorists in the Las Vegas Valley. The tower also presents problems for air traffic controllers, who have to guide certain planes to avoid the structure.

The tower is a popular draw for tourists, and is a notable part of the Las Vegas skyline. The top of the tower has two observation decks and a restaurant known as "Top of the World", in addition to lounges, four thrill rides, and a wedding chapel. An indoor observation deck is located on the 108th floor, while stairs lead to an outdoor deck on the 109th floor, both providing wraparound views of the Las Vegas Valley. The indoor deck was remodeled in 2019.

The tower elevators, among the fastest in the world, travel at a speed of 1,800 feet per minute (9.1 m/s). The tower also includes 1,455 steps leading up to the 108th floor, which rises 855 feet (261 m). Since 2009, the tower has hosted a fundraising event called Scale the Strat, which benefits the American Lung Association. Hundreds of people compete each year in the stair-racing event, in which individual participants race to the top of the tower for the best time, separated from each other by one-minute intervals. Aside from the races, the stairs are otherwise closed to the public.

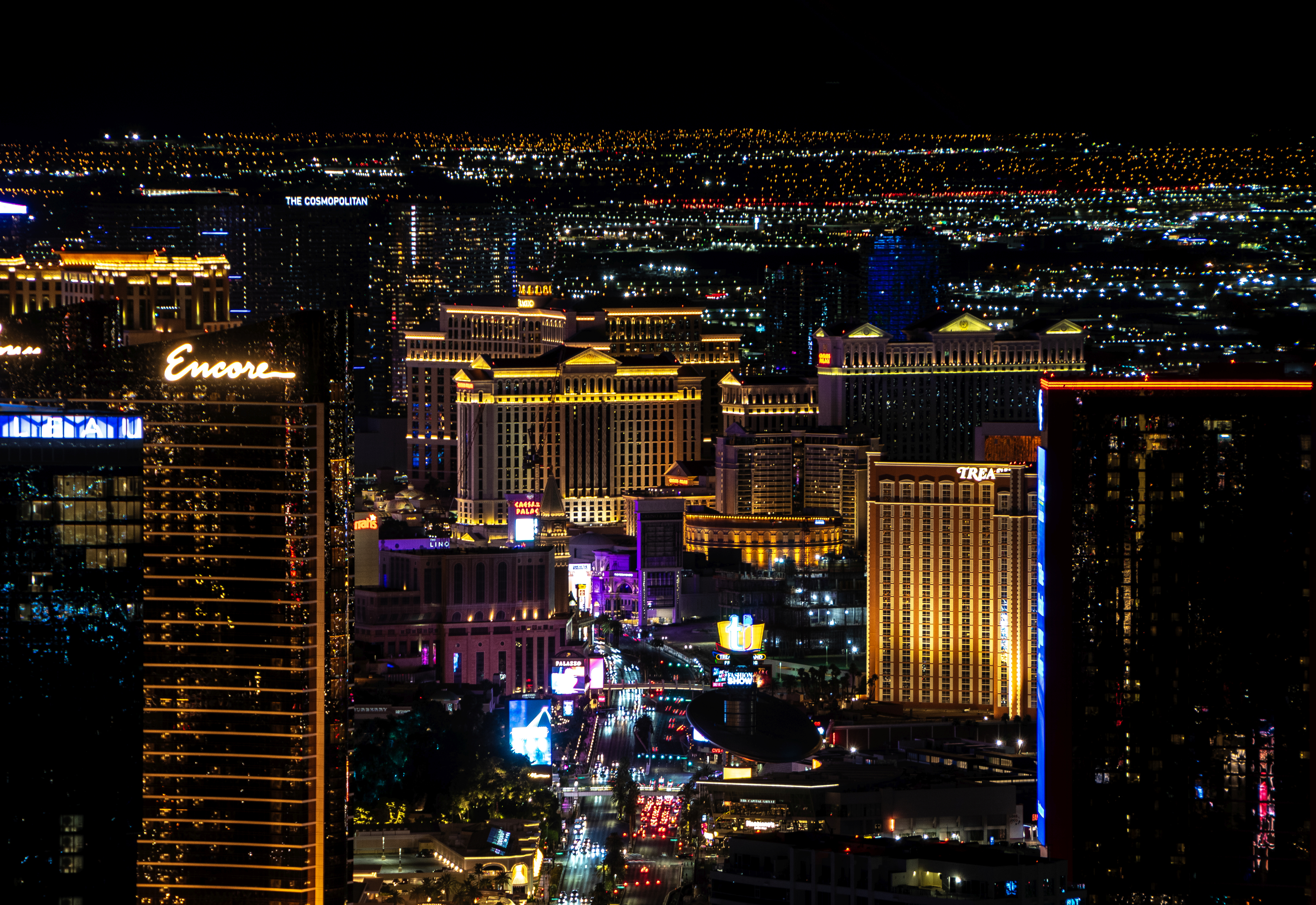
The Las Vegas Strip as viewed from the Strat observation tower, 2025

The tower cost $70 million to construct. It weighs approximately 50,000 tons and has nearly 290 mi (470 km) of reinforced steel bars. The tower's pod includes the restaurant and contains 12 stories. The exterior of the pod has one and a half miles of criss-crossed fiber-optic cable with lights which alternate between eight different colors. A 149-foot (45 m) needle located on top of the pod consists of a 5-square-foot (0.46 m^{2}) steel-beam frame with an internal ladder. Atop the needle frame are two four-inch beams which are laid out horizontally to form an "X". A special rig for window washers is situated around the pod windows. In 2005, local jazz station KOAS 105.7 (FM) installed an antenna at the top of the tower, becoming the first station to do so. KVGS 107.9 (FM) also has an antenna atop the tower.

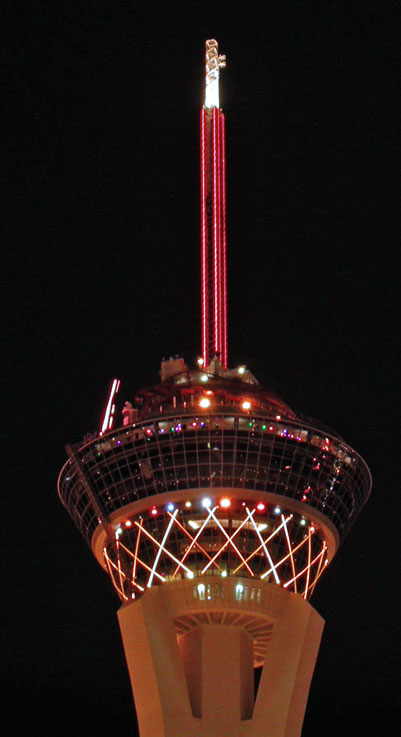
The tower pod and needle at night

During the design and construction phase, four fire inspectors were assigned to the project to ensure that it would be fire-safe. The tower was built with three emergency generators. At the time of opening, the pod included two concrete-banded bunker floors, located beneath its three wedding chapels. The bunker was built on the two lowest floors of the pod, as smoke rises. In the case of a fire, the tower's elevators would be used for evacuation of the pod, unlike most buildings in which stairs would be used instead.

The base of the tower starts with three legs made of concrete, each weighing approximately 4,000,000 pounds (1,800,000 kg) and rising 264 feet (80 m), before meeting to form a center. From there, the tower rises further before reaching the start of the pod, at approximately 775 feet (236 m). The east tower leg was reportedly built at a crooked angle, due to a measurement mix-up. Two decades after its opening, a resort executive said, "We didn't own the property when it was built, and cannot verify this." He noted that an engineering firm made periodic inspections to ensure structural integrity.

During its construction, the tower won several negative awards from the Las Vegas Review-Journal, which named it as the "Las Vegas event you are tired of hearing about", the "worst Las Vegas eyesore", and the "community's biggest embarrassment". It was also voted worst casino theme in 1997, and worst attraction four years later. In 2006, readers of the newspaper named the Stratosphere as the ugliest building in Las Vegas.

Five people, bypassing security measures, have committed suicide by jumping from the tower's observation area, between 2000 and 2007. Additional suicides from jumping occurred in 2014 and 2021.

=== Attractions ===
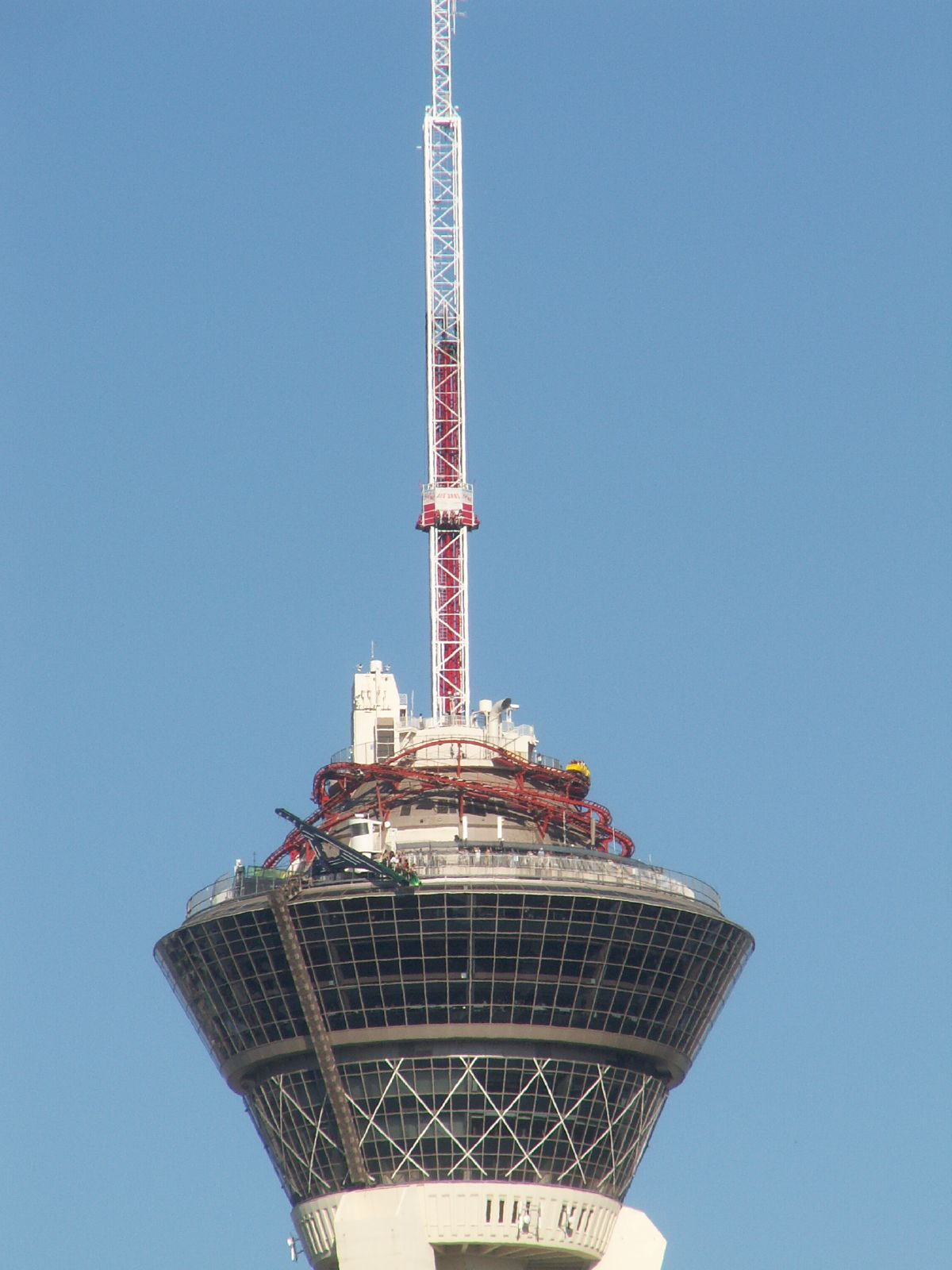
Rides at the top of the tower pod, 2005

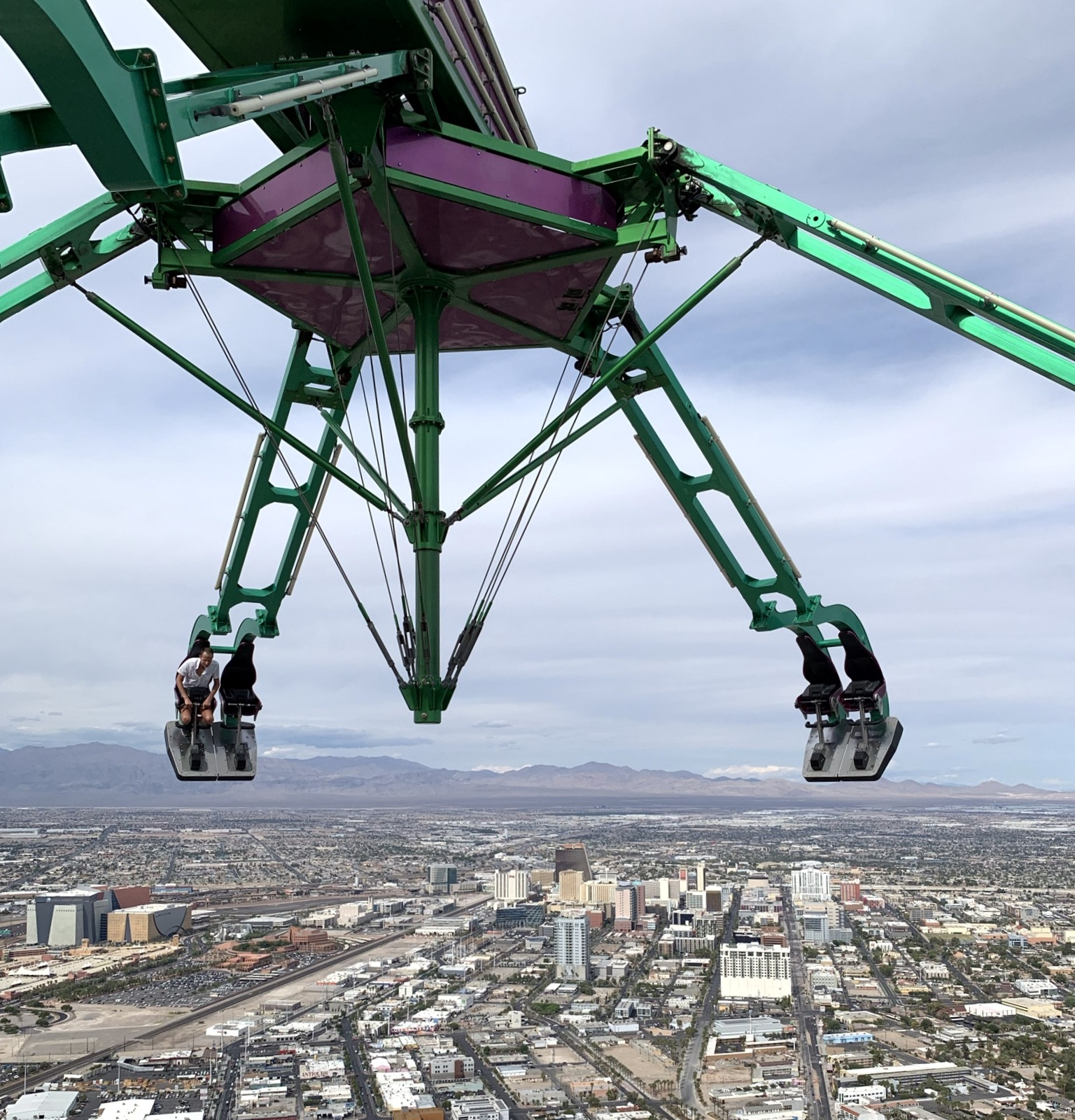
Insanity ride in 2021

Rides at the Strat include:

- Big Shot, opened along with the resort in 1996. The ride travels up and down the tower's needle. At 1,081 ft (329 m), it was the highest thrill ride in the world until the Sky Drop opened on the Canton Tower at 1,591 ft (485 m).
- X-Scream, opened in 2003. At 866 ft (264 m), it is the fourth highest thrill ride in the world. It consists of a single car that rolls back and forth on a straight piece of track that slightly overhangs the tower and pivots vertically in a see-saw motion.
- Insanity, opened in 2005. At 900 ft (270 m) is the third highest thrill ride in the world; it dangles riders over the edge of the tower and then spins in a circular pattern at approximately 40 miles per hour (64 km/h). In an incident shortly after opening, riders were left dangling several hundred feet for nearly an hour and a half when Insanity shut down; it was programmed to cease operation if a fault or problem is detected by the ride's control system. Strong winds caused the system to trigger the emergency stop.
- SkyJump Las Vegas, opened in 2010. SkyJump is a controlled-descent, bungee jumping-like ride that allows riders to plummet 855 ft (261 m) attached to a high-speed descent wire. SkyJump had its 100,000th rider in 2013, and its 200,000th in 2015.

A previous ride, a roller coaster called the High Roller, opened with the resort in 1996. It rode around the top of the tower pod. It closed on December 30, 2005, and was dismantled. The ride was considered underwhelming and was poorly received in comparison to the other rides. However, it was a financial success and attracted nearly 4 million riders by the time of its closure. At 909 ft (277 m), it was the second highest ride in the world and the highest roller coaster.

Strat-O-Fair, a 17,000-square-foot (1,600 m^{2}) midway themed after the 1963 World's fair, opened at the base of the tower in June 2000. Among its attractions were bumper cars and a Ferris wheel, measuring 45 feet in diameter.

In 2024, the Strat opened Atomic Golf, a four-story, 100,000-square-foot (9,300 m^{2}) golf entertainment facility. The project, which cost $75 million, includes 103 hitting bays and several bars. It was built on seven acres – located directly north of the resort – that were leased out to developer Flite Golf & Entertainment.

==== Unbuilt rides ====
Two rides were proposed for the tower but were never built. As the resort opened in 1996, there were plans to add a $6 million "King Kong" ride, also known as "Belly of the Beast". Riders would be placed in the stomach of a giant mechanical gorilla that would scale the Stratosphere tower. The ride would carry a total of 48 people and would go halfway up the tower. On its way down, the ride would drop several feet at a time, to give riders the sensation of falling. The ride's opening was delayed in May 1996, because design and engineering work took longer than expected. The project was canceled two months later. A Stratosphere spokesman said, "It was determined to be not feasible and we couldn't be sure it would be an exciting ride. It was an engineering challenge, to say the least." The ride had been scheduled to open later in 1996.

The second ride was proposed in 2001, acting as a $20 million roller coaster that would transport riders over Las Vegas Boulevard. A 740-foot tower would be built next to the Stratosphere tower, and the roller coaster would travel down this new tower before going up a 416-foot tower on the opposite side of the street. Area residents were opposed to the ride, citing concerns about its impact on housing values and the quality of life. Residents were concerned about noise and traffic that would occur in the area if the ride were built, although the resort denied that noise would be an issue. Nevada Assemblywoman Chris Giunchigliani said the ride would make the neighborhood look like a carnival.

The Stratosphere stated that the new ride was necessary to compete against the nearby Adventuredome, as well as a NASCAR attraction at the Sahara resort. The earlier King Kong ride had received city approval in 1996, with no expiration, and resort executives suggested that they may revive that project if the Las Vegas City Council were to reject the new roller coaster proposal. Residents were also opposed to the King Kong ride. In response to the opposition, the Stratosphere suggested that it may withdraw financial support for the Las Vegas Monorail project, which would connect downtown with the Las Vegas Strip. The roller coaster ride failed to get the support of the city council, and the Stratosphere withdrew its financing of $250,000 for the monorail project, which would have had a stop at the resort. A scaled-back, slower version of the roller coaster ride was proposed in 2002, but it was also denied approval. The Stratosphere took legal action in an effort to get the ride built, but the resort lost its challenges in court.

=== Restaurants ===
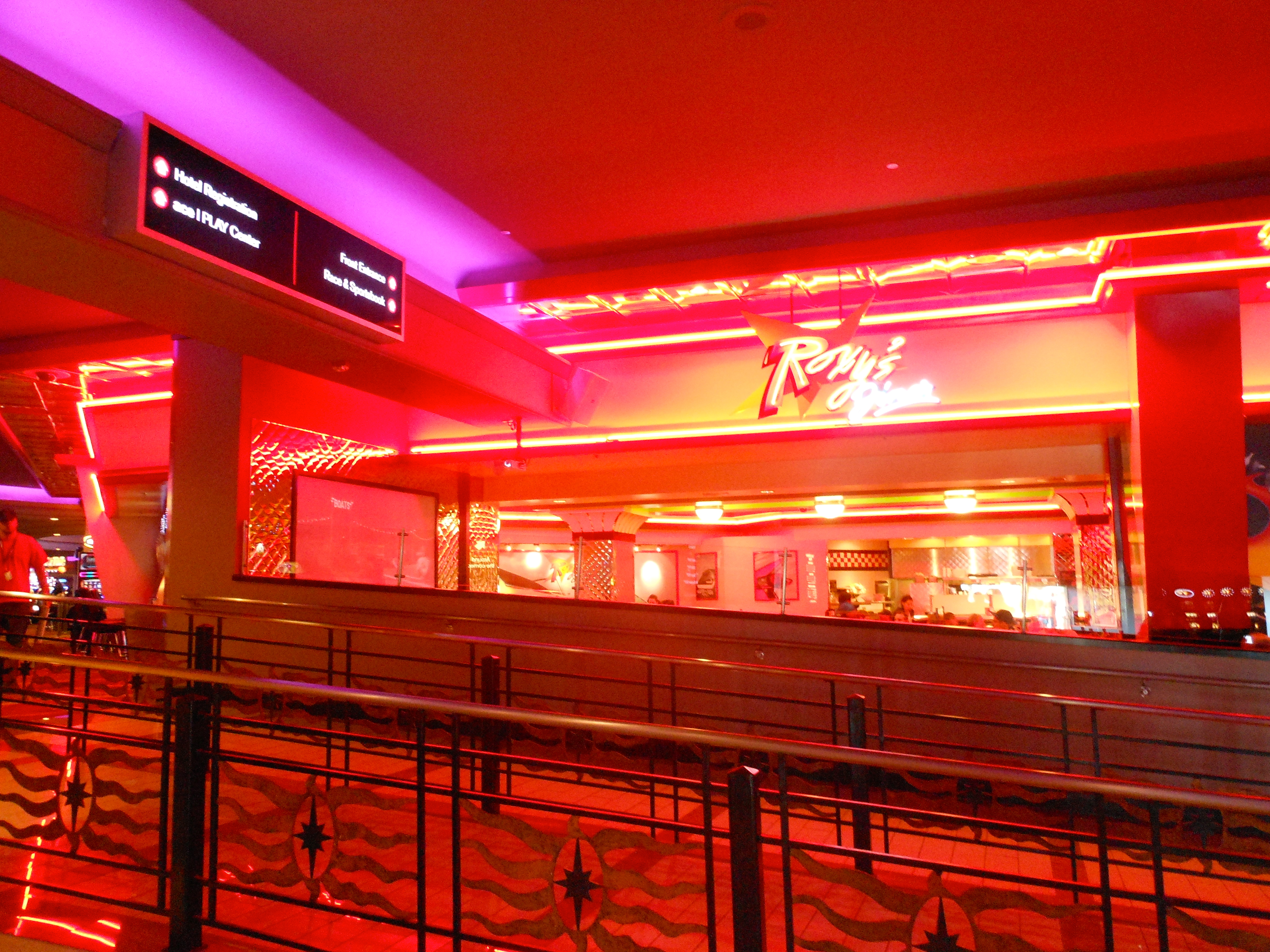
Roxy's Diner in 2011

Top of the World is a revolving restaurant, taking about 80 minutes to complete a full rotation. It is located on the 106th floor of the tower, providing overhead views of the Las Vegas Valley.

The resort has had numerous other restaurants, including a buffet, and a steakhouse known as McCall's Heartland Grill. Roxy's Diner had operated since the resort's opening. It eventually closed in 2018, replaced by the Strat Café.

A snack bar, 108 Eats, opened on the 108th floor observation deck in 2019. PT's, a local chain of bar-restaurants owned by Golden Entertainment, opened a location at the Strat in 2020, under the name PT's Wings & Sports.

=== Tower Shops ===
The Tower Shops is a mall on the second level. The elevators that lead up to the observation decks are only accessible in the mall. DeBartolo Realty Corporation, which owned a 50-percent interest in the Tower Shops, was acquired by Simon Property Group in March 1996, forming Simon DeBartolo Group. The Tower Shops were a joint venture between Simon DeBartolo Group and Gordon Group, under the name Strato-Retail. The Stratosphere leased the retail space to Strato-Retail, which then subleased it to retail tenants.

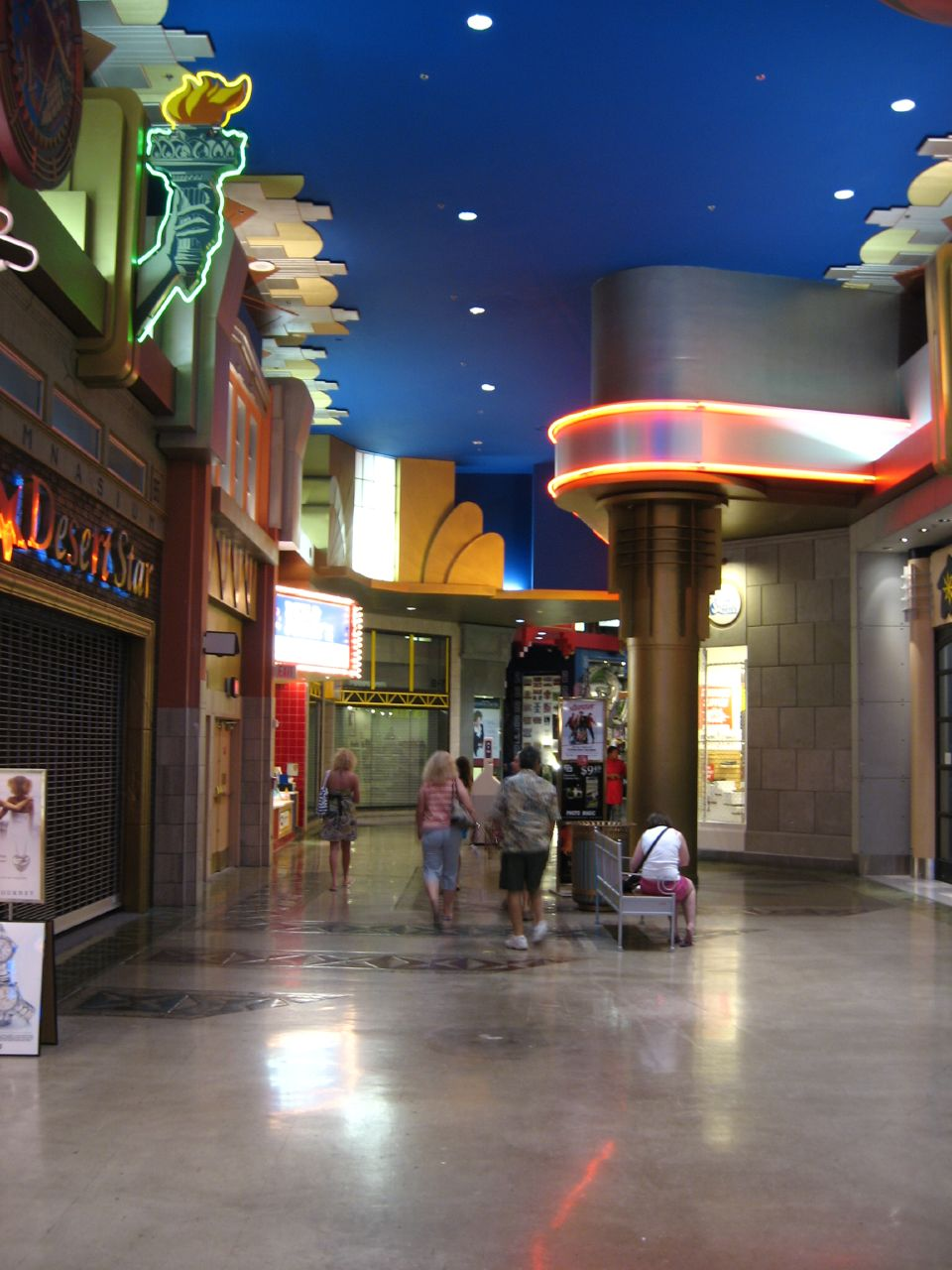
Tower Shops in 2008

When the Stratosphere opened in April 1996, its retail area was still largely under construction and consisted only of vendor carts spread across three areas with their own theme: Chinese, French, and Manhattan. The mall was built by Missouri construction company McCarthy, which was finishing the first phase in May 1996. Because of the resort's financial problems, the next phase of the Tower Shops was halted in August 1996, leaving the mall with 69,000 sq ft (6,400 m^{2}) of retail space. The second phase, scheduled for completion in December 1996, would have increased the mall to 160,000 sq ft (15,000 m^{2}). The second phase would have included a Rainforest Cafe as its main anchor tenant. A Kids Quest child-care center was also planned as part of the second phase.

As of February 1997, the mall had 32 of 45 stores opened, with the remainder expected to open by the end of the second quarter. The mall had approximately 300 employees. As of October 1997, there were 36 stores, including a clothing store owned by Las Vegas mayor Jan Jones, who also owned shares in Grand Casinos. Approximately 85 percent of the retail space was occupied, and 98 percent was leased.

By 1998, retailers in the Tower Shops were experiencing financial difficulties and lack of customer traffic, which the retailers blamed on the resort's unfinished facilities. Strato-Retail filed suits against several of the mall's retailers, alleging non-payment of rent. Two retailers that were locked in for expensive, long-term leases filed suits against Strato-Retail. As of March 1999, the Stratosphere planned to add a new escalator which the resort said would lead up to the casino's showroom. However, Strato-Retail sued Stratosphere Corporation, alleging that the escalator would hinder business to the Tower Shops by allowing visitors to bypass the mall on their way to the top of the observation tower. The resort denied that the escalator could be used to access the tower. Strato-Retail won a permanent injunction against the escalator's construction.

In 2000, Stratosphere Corporation purchased the mall from Strato-Retail for $12.5 million. In 2004, the Tower Shops had 110,000 sq ft (10,000 m^{2}) of retail space, which was approximately 90 percent leased. That year, the mall announced plans for an additional 80,000 sq ft (7,400 m^{2}) of retail space. The expansion would occupy undeveloped space that was meant for the Tower Shops' originally planned second phase. At the time, the mall had approximately 50 stores and 15 retail carts.

== Live entertainment ==
At its opening, the Stratosphere included the 700-seat Broadway showroom, and a 300-seat lounge called the Images Cabaret, which also hosted performers. The Stratosphere opened along with a celebrity impersonator show known as American Superstars, which initially ran in the lounge. Danny Gans also had a residency, which took place in the showroom. Gans' contract expired at the end of 1996, and he moved on to the Rio resort, after disagreements with the Stratosphere. Gans had wanted more advertising from the Stratosphere for his show, although the resort was financially unable to do so. The resort, meanwhile, wanted Gans to perform more often, which he declined to do. Following his departure, American Superstars moved into the showroom.

A small-scale afternoon show, Viva Las Vegas, opened in the Broadway showroom in October 1996, in an effort to improve the resort's finances. The show had previously run for five years at the Sands Hotel and Casino, until its closing earlier in 1996. Hypnotist Marshall Sylver opened a show in the Images Cabaret in 1997. Two years later, Images Cabaret was relocated elsewhere in the resort, as the original location was replaced by the new sports book.

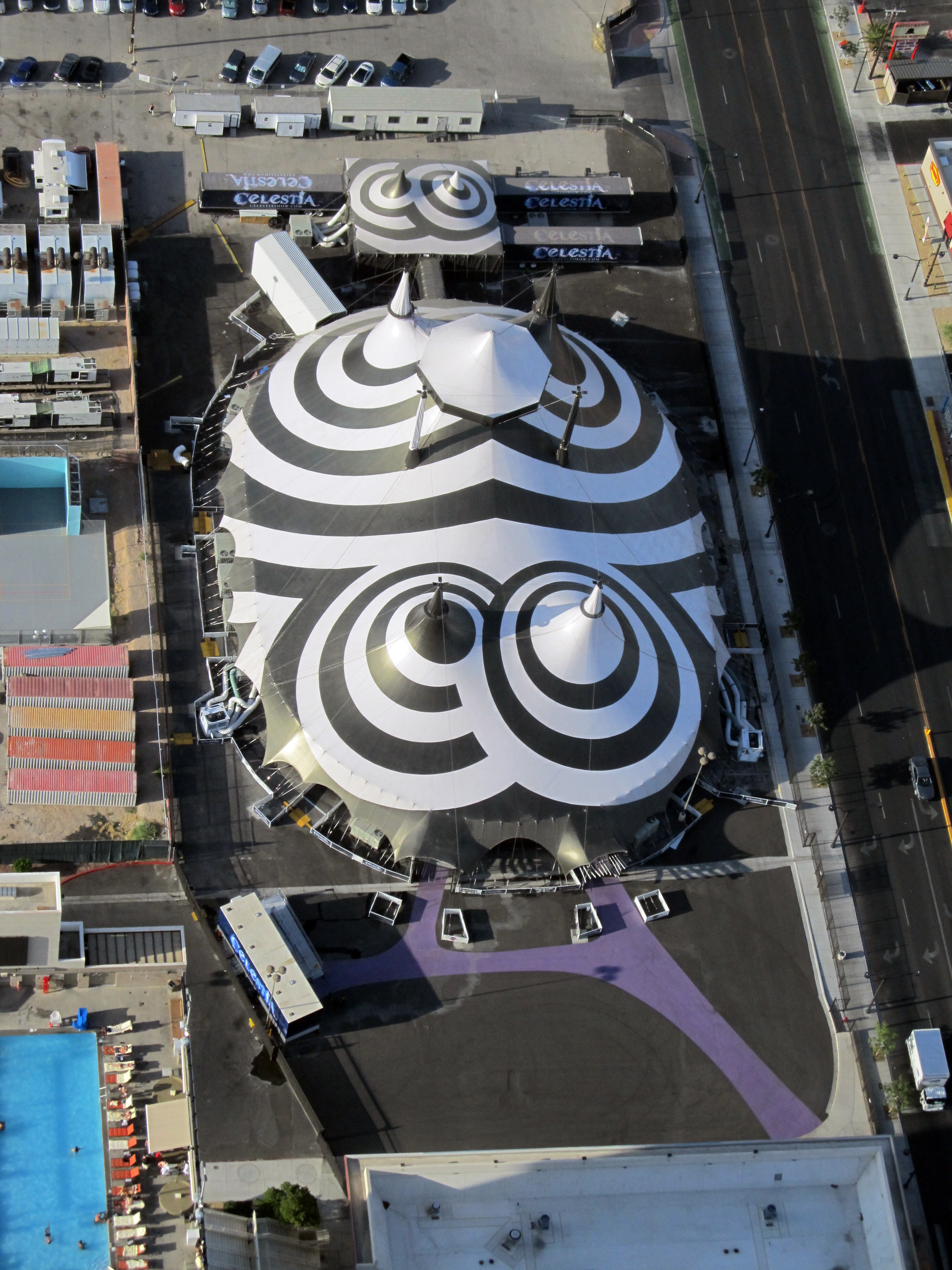
Overhead view of the Celestia tent

As of 2001, Viva Las Vegas was the longest continuously running afternoon show in Las Vegas history. An outdoor stage, called the Outdoor Events Center, opened later that year. Built in the form of a grandstand, it offered seating for approximately 3,600 people. As an alternative to larger venues, the Outdoor Events Center offered low-priced events, which included boxing matches and musical performances. In 2004, the resort's Theater of the Stars showroom launched a topless vampire-themed show by Tim Molyneux called Bite, featuring rock and roll music. Viva Las Vegas closed in December 2006.

American Superstars closed in March 2011, as the producers and resort came to a mutual decision to end the show after a 15-year run. It was one of the longest-running shows in Las Vegas history. Later that year, singer Frankie Moreno signed a two-year residency. The Theater of the Stars showroom was renovated under the direction of Moreno, and was renamed as the Stratosphere Showroom. Tommy Ward was Moreno's opening act for nine-months. Bite ended its run in 2012.

David Perrico, with the band Pop Evolution, signed in 2013 for a monthly show. Claire Sinclair, a Playboy Playmate, starred in a burlesque musical show titled Pin Up, which launched in 2013 and ran for four years. Moreno signed an extension and eventually concluded his residency at the end of 2014. By 2016, the resort had begun offering a Michael Jackson tribute show called MJ Live.

The Strat added an acrobatic show, Celestia, in June 2019. The show was performed inside a 30,000-square-foot (2,800 m^{2}) tent located outside the Strat. Celestia closed in 2020, during the COVID-19 pandemic. A year later, plans were underway to renovate the Strat's 600-seat theater. The resort partnered with SPI Entertainment and hoped to make the resort a well-known destination for live entertainment. Illusionist Xavier Mortimer opened a magic show on July 1, 2021. Another magic show, by mentalist Banachek, was opened a month later, along with a glow-in-the-dark dance show by iLuminate. A concert residency by Sammy Hagar took place later in 2021. Rouge, a show featuring topless dancers, debuted the following year.

== In popular culture ==
- In 1998, some filming took place at the Stratosphere for an episode of Chicago Hope.
- The Stratosphere appears in the background of a 1998 King of the Hill episode Next of Shin as Hank, Dale, and Bill search for Hank's father Cotton in Las Vegas.
- In 1999, scenes for the game show Real World/Road Rules Challenge 2000 were filmed involving contestants bungee jumping from the Stratosphere's tower.
- The Stratosphere was also used in 1999 for filming of the television series The Strip.
- The casino and tower are featured in the 2005 movie Domino, in which the owner gets robbed of $10 million and the top of the tower gets damaged in an explosion.
- Merlin's Tower, a fictionalized version of The Strat, was used as a premonition setting in the 2005 Final Destination novel, "Dead Man's Hand".
- The tower is the inspiration for the Vertigo Spire location/map featured in the 2006 video game Tom Clancy's Rainbow Six: Vegas.
- The tower was featured in the Life After People 2009 episode "Sin City Meltdown". Three hundred years after people, the tower is one of the last recognizable things in Las Vegas, but an earthquake eventually brings it down.
- The 2002 death of 16-year-old Las Vegas teen Levi Presley, by suicide from the observation deck, became the basis for John D'Agata's 2010 essay "What Happens There" for The Believer, and later D'Agata and Jim Fingal's 2012 book The Lifespan of a Fact.
- The Lucky 38, a fictional tower casino featured in the 2010 video game Fallout: New Vegas, partially resembles the Stratosphere.
- Actors Michael Douglas and Mary Steenburgen rode on the X-Scream ride to shoot a scene for the 2013 film Last Vegas.
- In 2013, the tower was featured in episode 24 of the third season of the Israeli edition of The Amazing Race as part of a Roadblock task where contestants had to jump off of the tower on the SkyJump.
- In the 2014 Syfy television series Dominion, the archangel Michael lived in the observation tower of the Stratosphere.
- A replica of the tower can be found in the 2014 racing game The Crew, in the northern part of Las Vegas.
- The hotel, casino and tower was featured at the beginning of the 2016 film Sharknado: The 4th Awakens.
- In 2023, filming took place at the Strat for the action-comedy film The Family Plan.
- In May 2023, Tyler Toney, of the YouTube group Dude Perfect, set the world record for highest basketball shot with a shot at a height of 856 feet (260.9 m.) which was taken at the Skyjump Las Vegas platform on the observation tower. It was later shown in a Dude Perfect YouTube video focused on it.

== Gallery ==
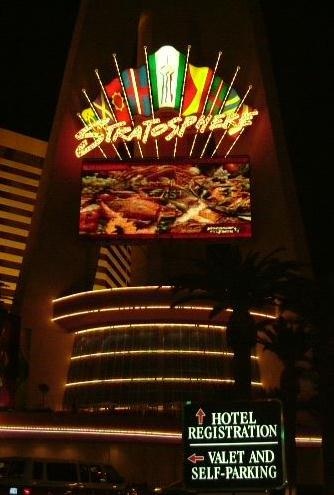
Neon sign on the observation tower, 2004

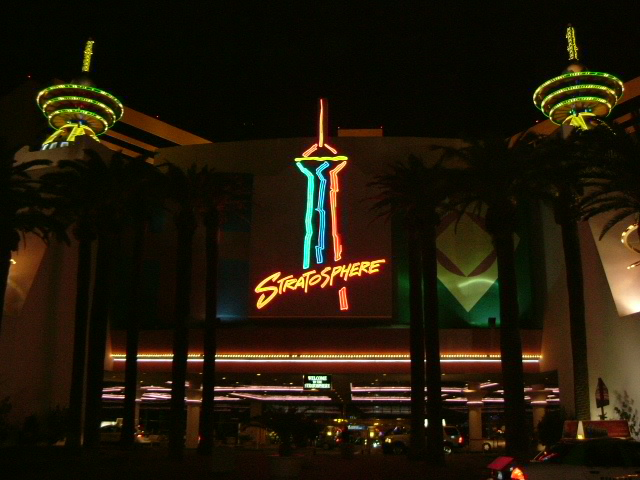
Main entrance in 2004

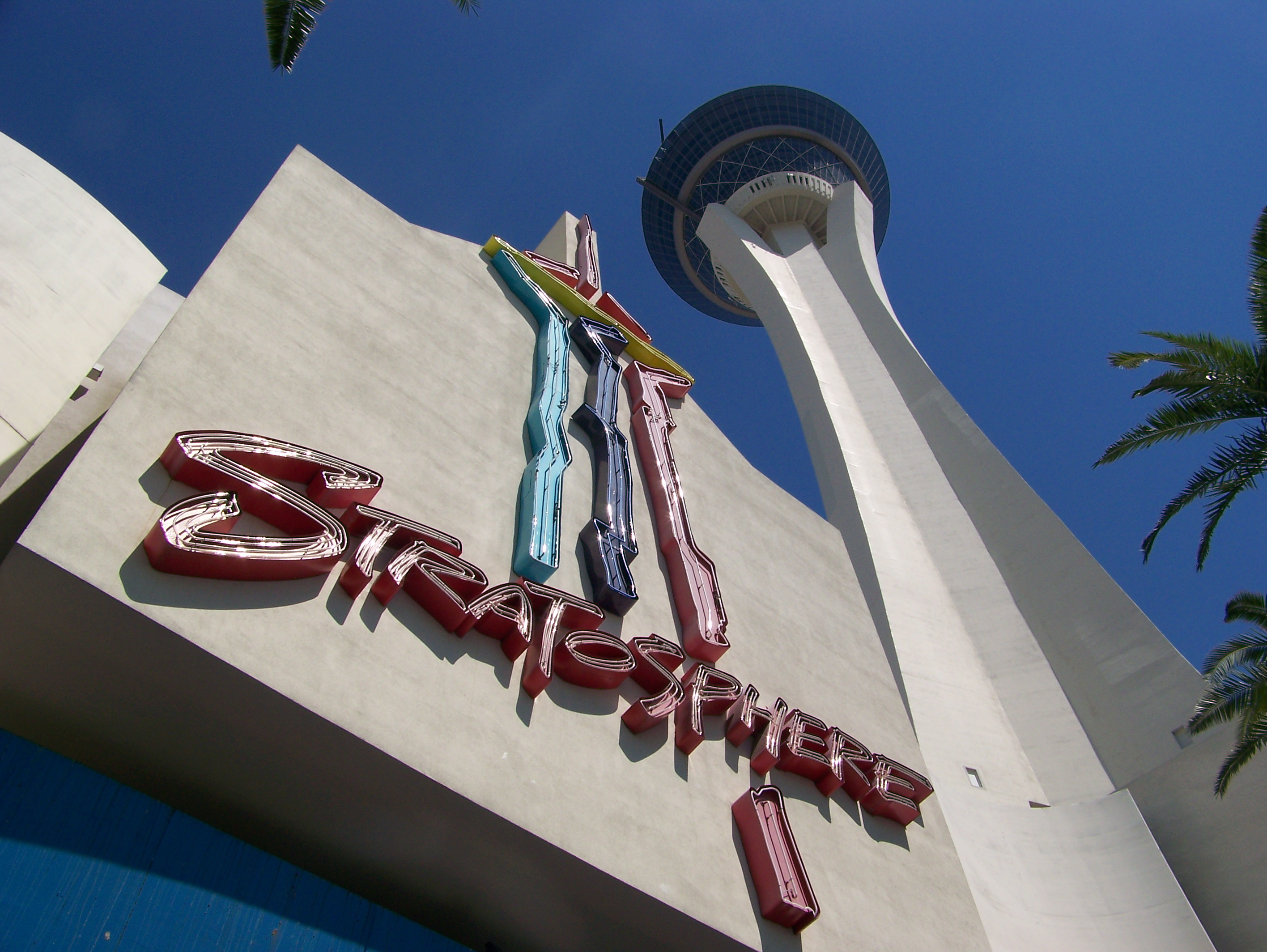
A neon sign during the day

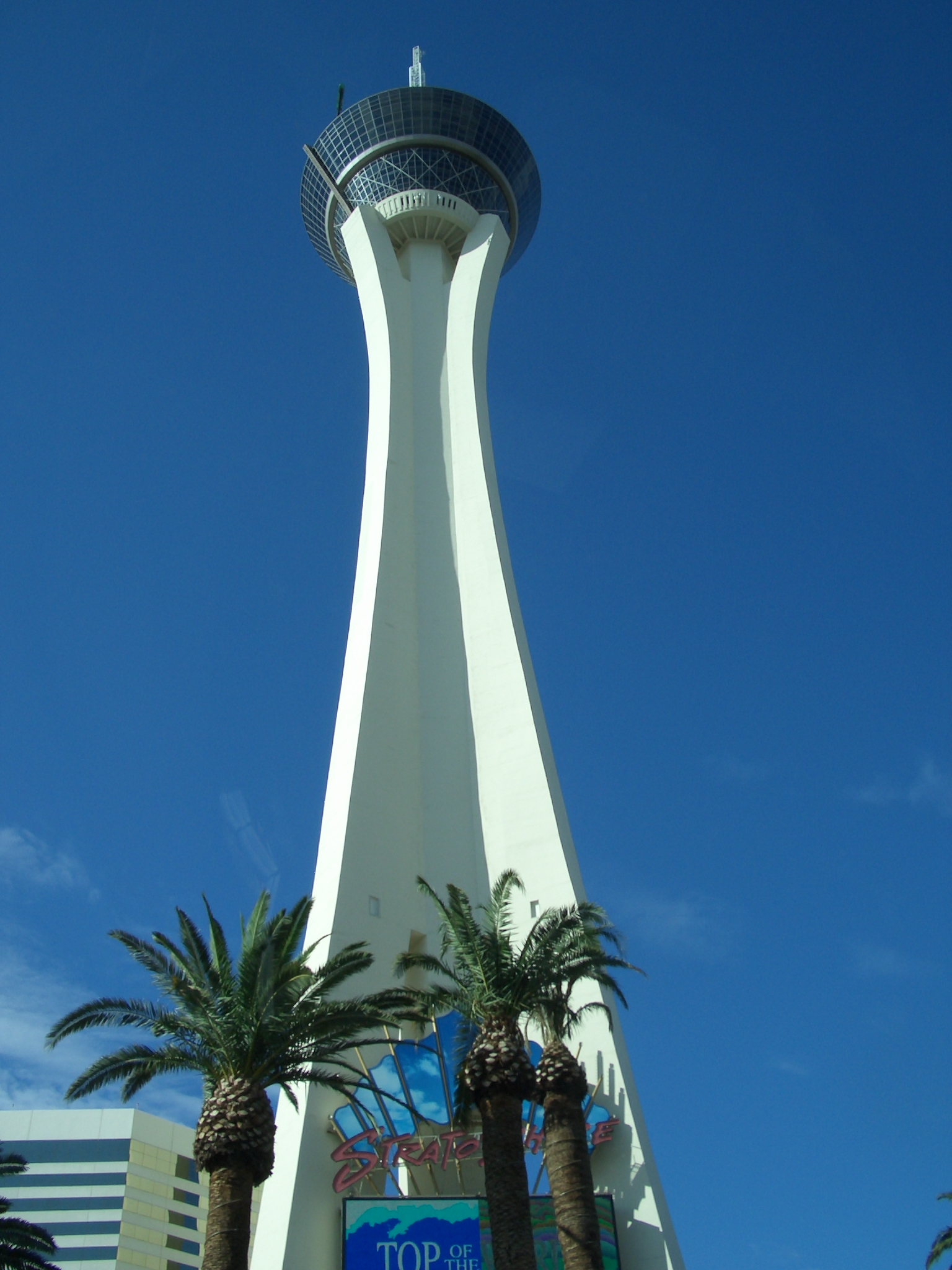
Front of the tower

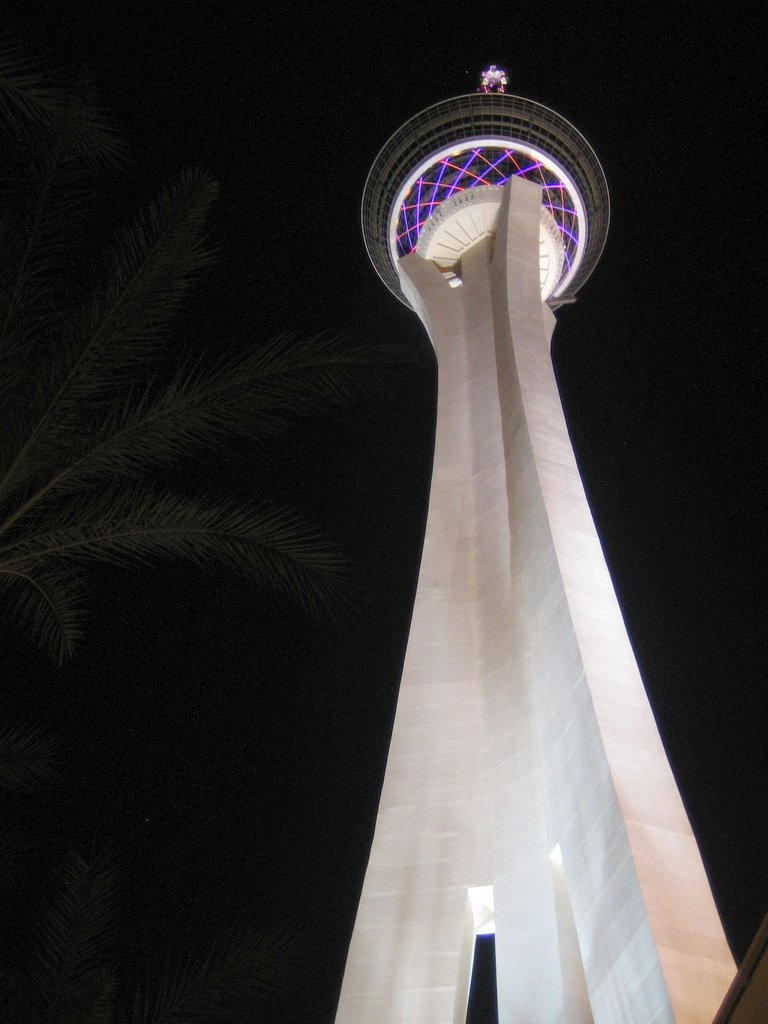
View from the ground

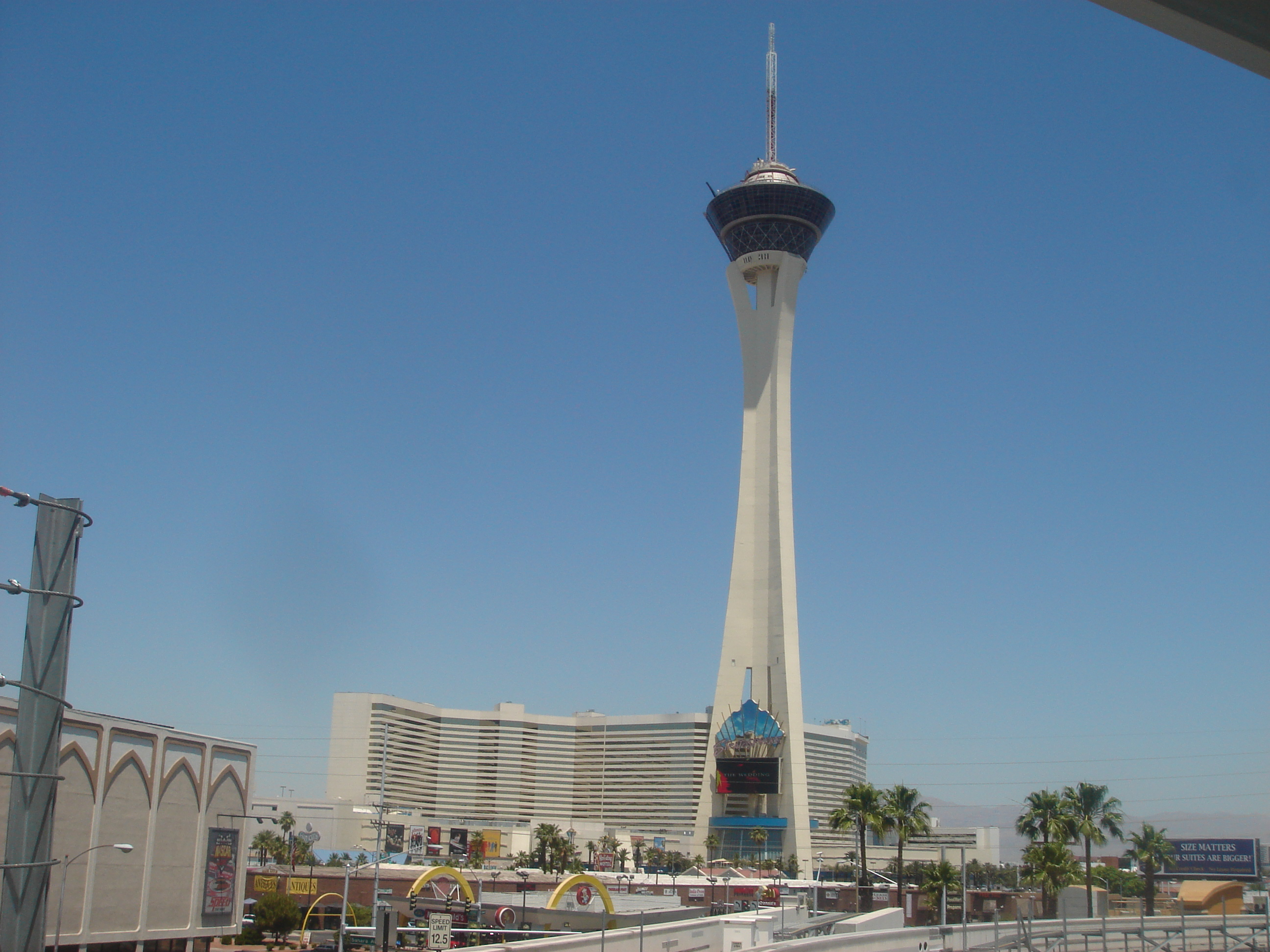
Stratosphere tower and hotel buildings

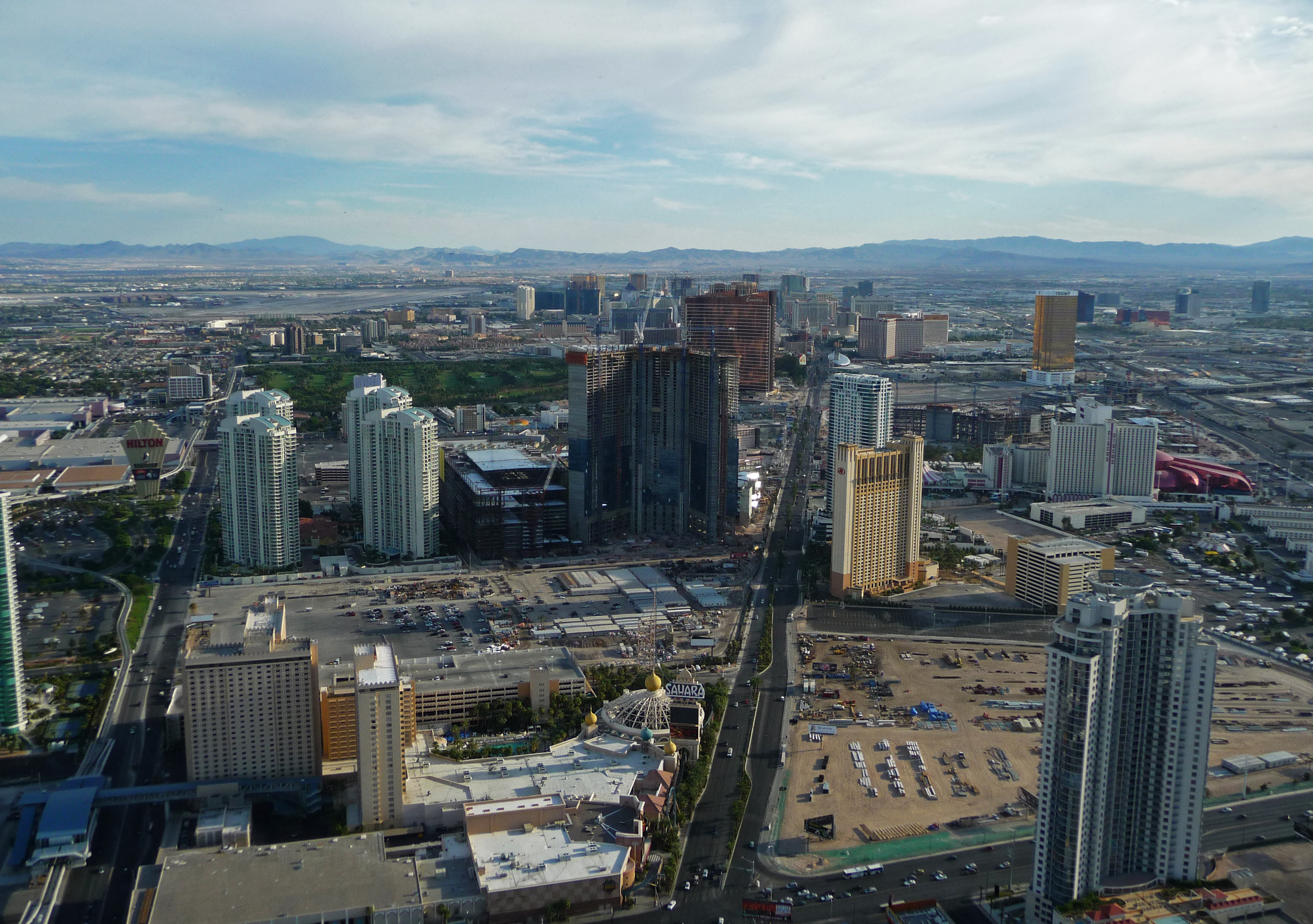
View from the tower pod, overlooking the Strip in 2008

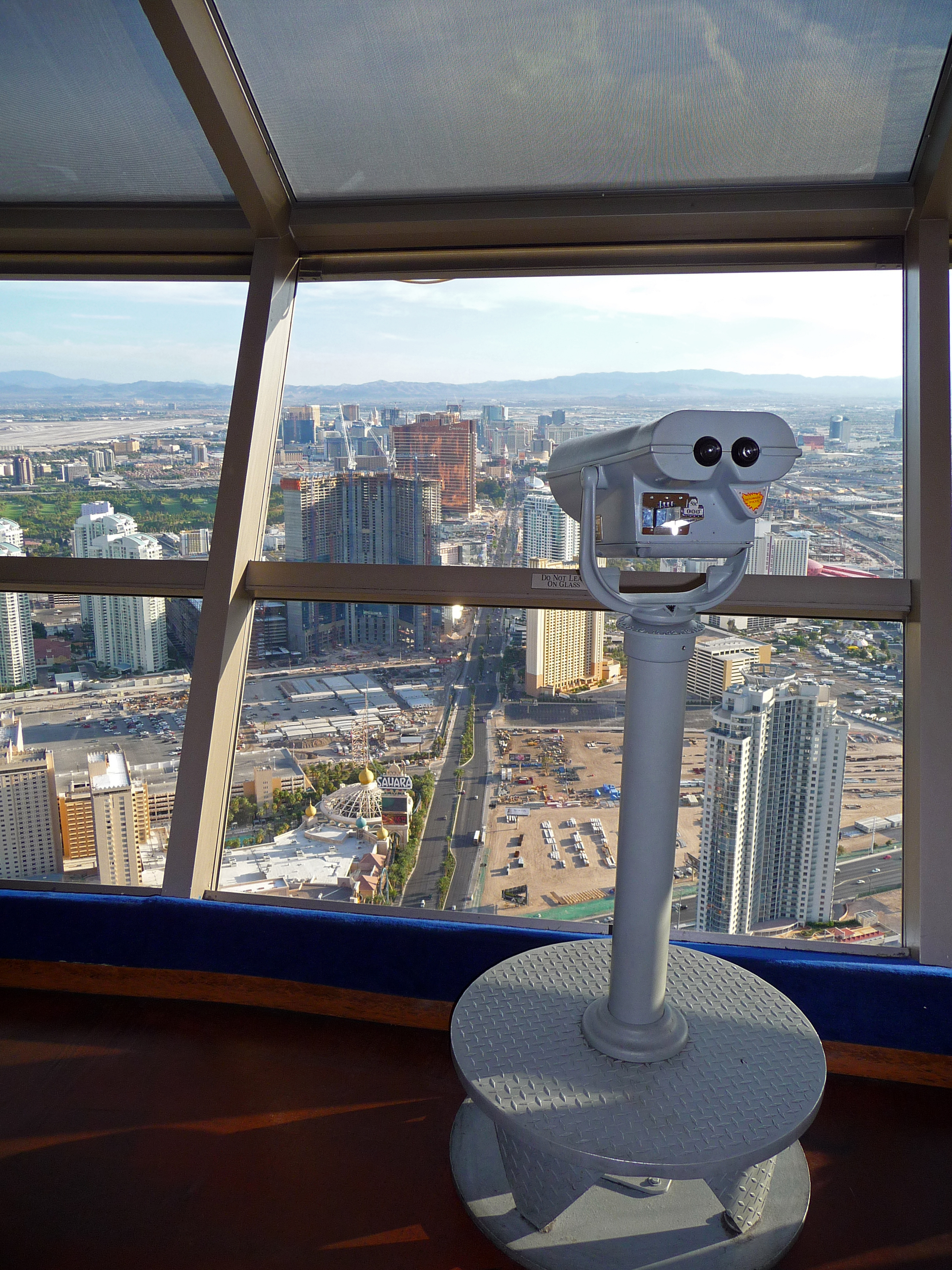
Overlooking the Strip in 2008

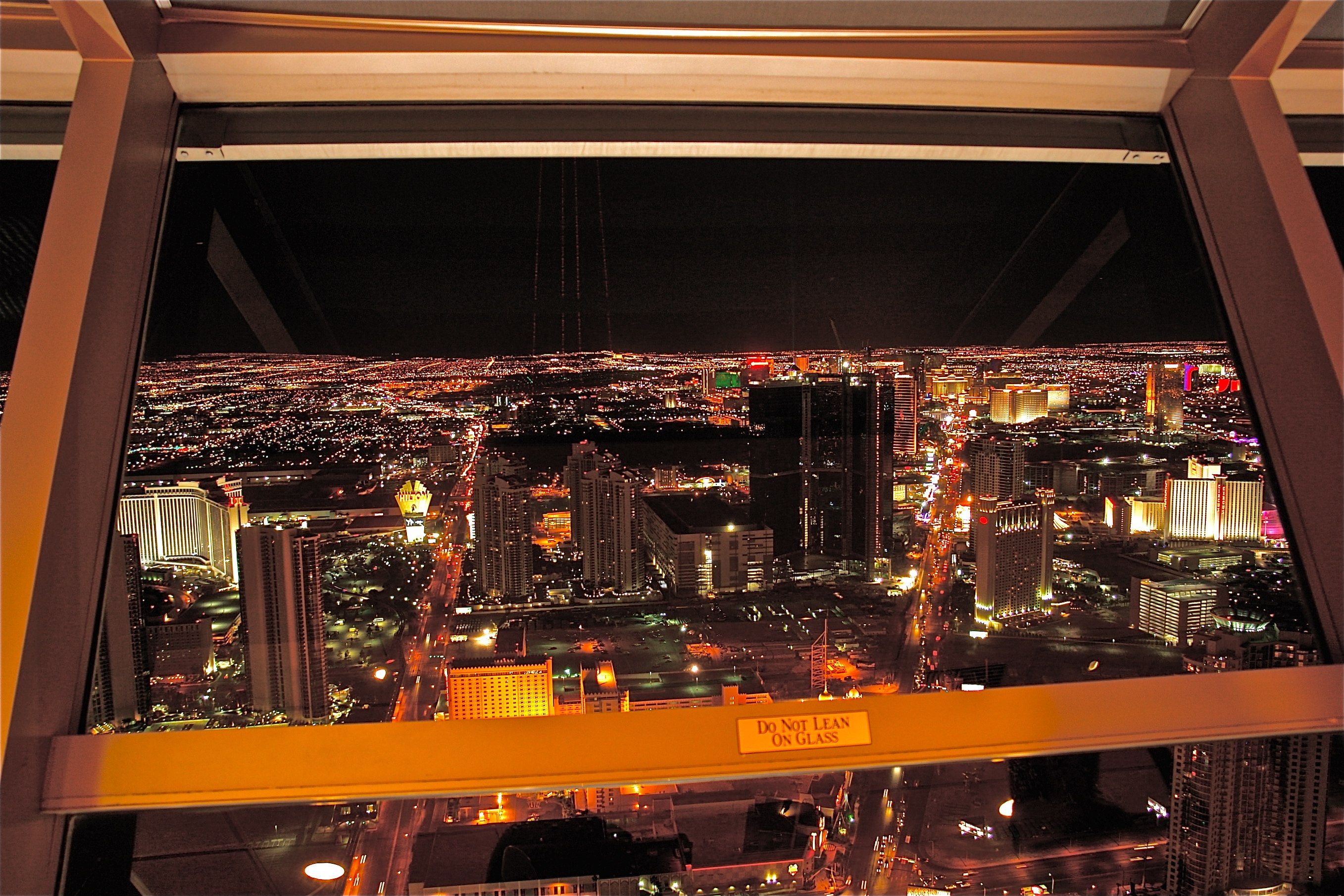
Same view, at night

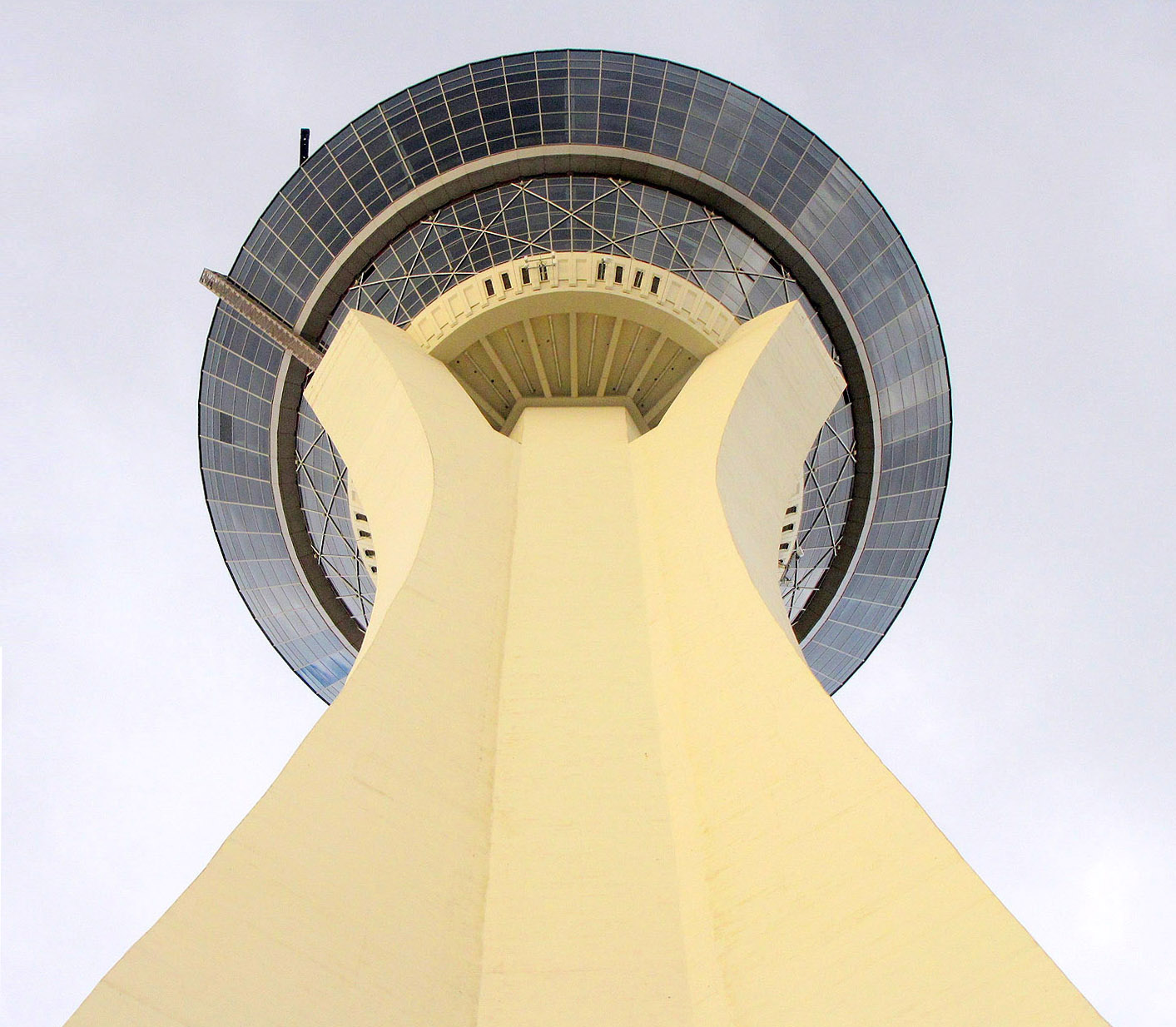
Looking up from the base of the tower, with the X-Scream ride hanging over the edge in 2009

Stratosphere logo, 2011

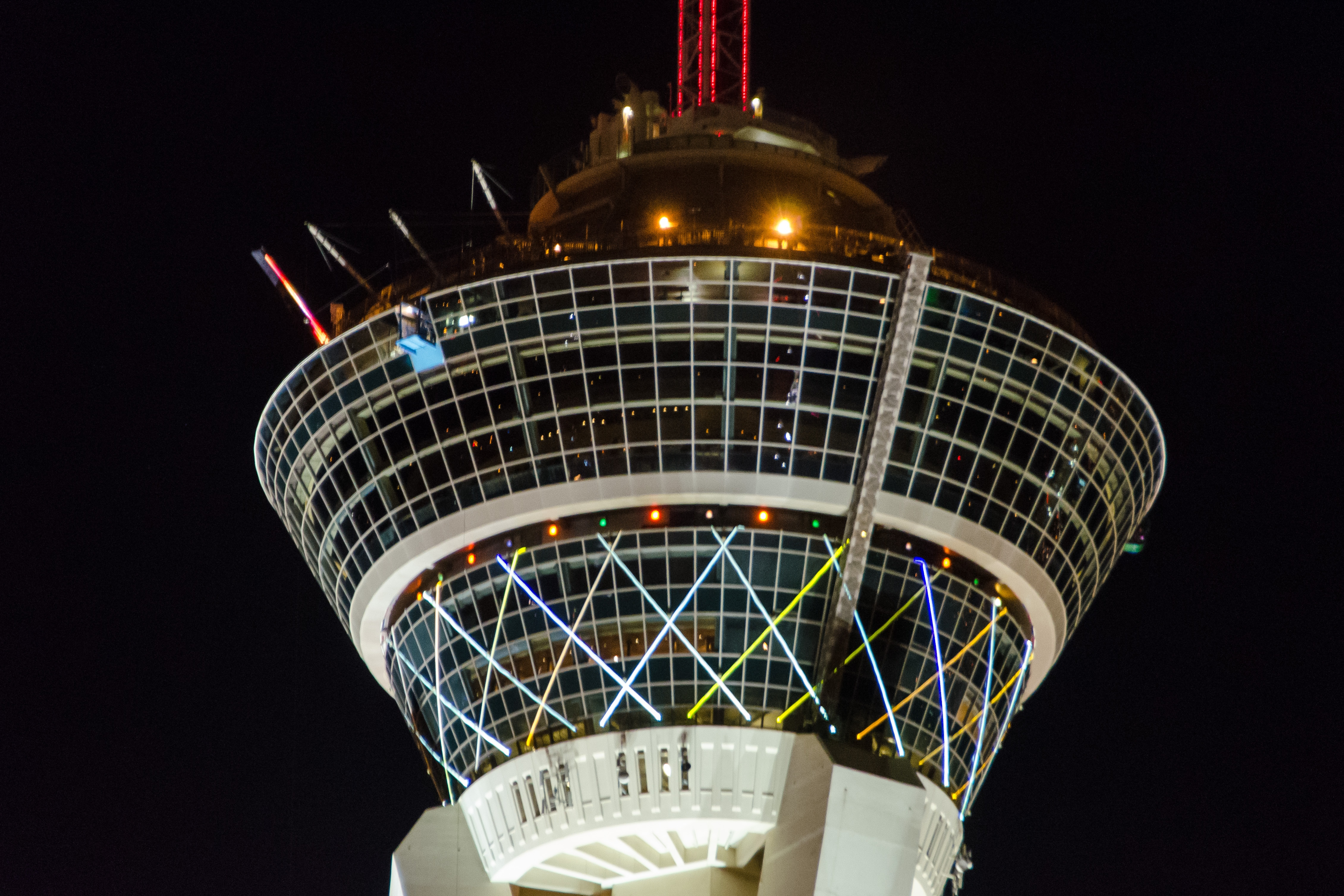
Close-up of the pod

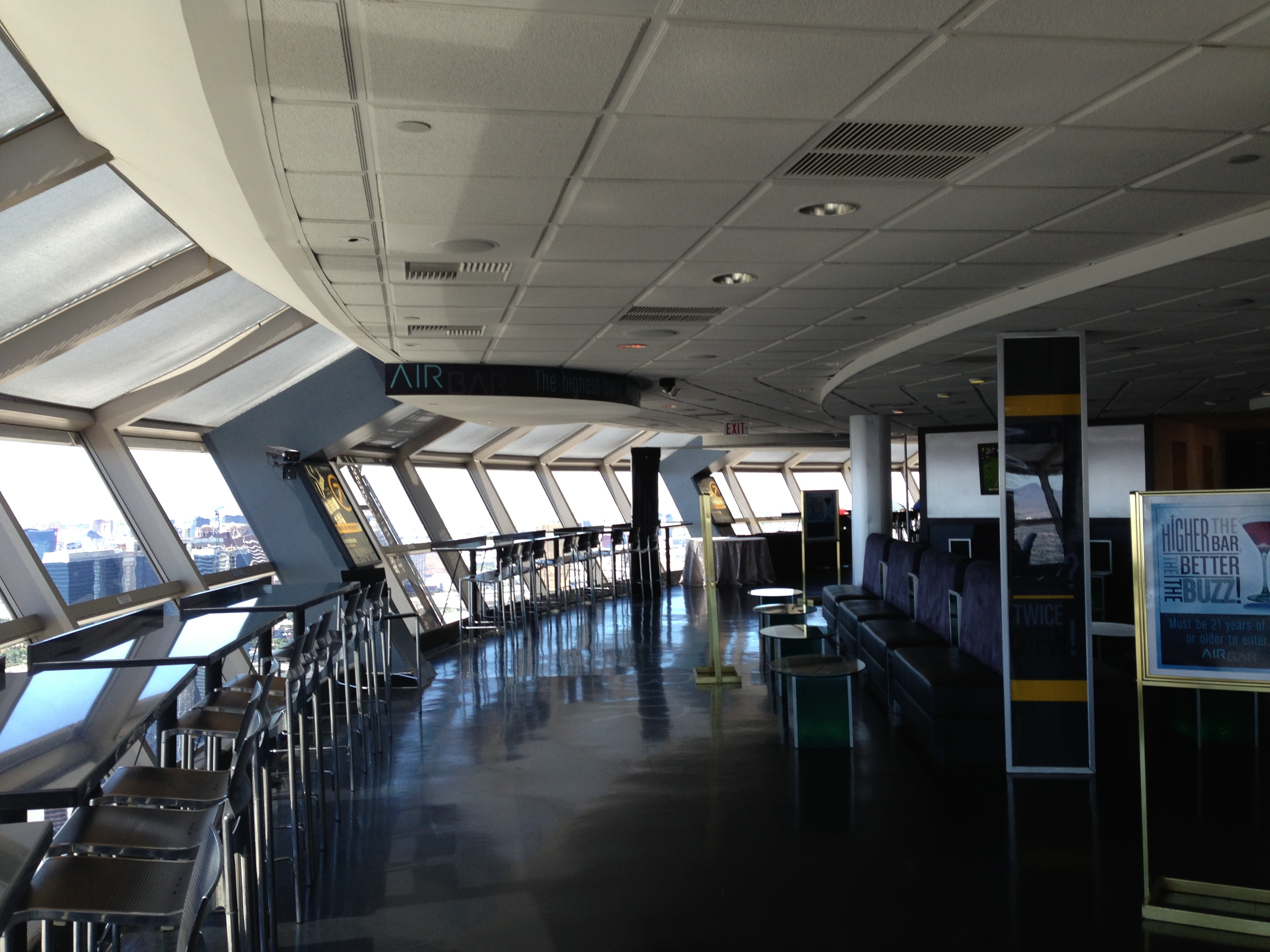
Inside the pod

== See also ==
- Landmark (hotel and casino), a similar Las Vegas property
- List of integrated resorts
- List of tallest observation towers in the United States
