= Megabyte (disambiguation) =

Megabyte (MB) is a decimallized unit of data storage measurement equalling 10^{6} bytes.

Megabyte may also refer to:

- Mebibyte (MiB), the idiomatic unit of data storage measurement, equal to 2^{20} bytes, similar to "megabyte" (MB).
- Megabyte (ReBoot), a fictional character from the CG animated TV fictional universe ReBoot
- MEGABYTE Act of 2016 (Making Electronic Government Accountable By Yielding Tangible Efficiencies) H.R. 4904, a federal law of the United States of America

== See also ==
- Megabite (disambiguation)
- Megabit (Mb) 10^{6} bits
- Mebibit (Mib) 2^{20} bits
- M-Byte, a battery electric car from Sino-American marque Byton, see Future Mobility Corporation
- MB (disambiguation)
- Mega (disambiguation)
- Byte (disambiguation)
