= Bitten =

Bitten may refer to:

- Bitten (2008 film), a Canadian black comedy vampire film
- Bitten (2023 film), a French coming-of-age drama film
- Bitten (novel), a 2001 novel by Kelley Armstrong
- Bitten (TV series), a 2014 television series
- Bitten, an anthology book by RL Stine that contains Dangerous Girls and The Taste of Night
- Bitten, a fashion line created by actress Sarah Jessica Parker

== See also ==
- Bight (disambiguation)
- Bit (disambiguation)
- Bite (disambiguation)
- Bittern (disambiguation)
- Byte
- Nibble (disambiguation)
