= Byte (disambiguation) =

A byte is a unit of digital information in computing and telecommunications that most commonly consists of eight bits.

Byte may also refer to:

- Byte (comics), a character from DC Comics
- Byte (magazine), a computer industry magazine
- Byte (song), a song by Martin Garrix and Brooks
- Bytes (album), an album by Black Dog Productions
- Byte (retailer), a computer retailer in the United Kingdom
- Byte (dinghy), a sailing dinghy
- Byte, a naming series for electric cars from Byton
- Byte (service), a video sharing app.

== See also ==
- Nybble
- Bight (disambiguation)
- Bite (disambiguation)
