= Bits =

Bits or BITS may refer to:

== Technology ==
- Plural of bit, computer memory unit.
- Drill bits, cutting tools used to create cylindrical holes
- Background Intelligent Transfer Service, a file transfer service
- Built-in tests

== Institutions ==
- BITS Pilani (Birla Institute of Technology and Science), a technical university in Pilani, India
- Blind Information Technology Specialists, an affiliate of the American Council of the Blind
- Business and Information Technology School, a former business school in Iserlohn (Germany), now merged into University of Europe for Applied Sciences
- Bukareshter Idishe Teater-Studie or Bucharest Yiddish Studio Theater, a theater in Bucharest
- Plural of Bilateral investment treaty (BITs)

== Art ==
- Bits (album), the fourth and final album by American indie rock band Oxford Collapse
- Bits, a 2012 play by the Catalan mime comedy group Tricicle
- Bits (TV series), a British television entertainment program, on air 1999–2001
- Boyz in the Sink, a fictional boy band.

== See also ==
- Bit (disambiguation)
