= 8-bit (disambiguation) =

8-bit computing is computing with 8-bit addresses or units of data.

8-bit may also refer to:

== Technology ==
- Octet (computing), a unit of information that consists of eight bits
- Byte, a unit of information that commonly consists of eight bits
- 8bit, a MIME encoding
- 8-bit era, in the history of video game consoles
- 8-bit color, in computer graphics
- 8-bit sound

== Other uses ==
- 8-bit (music), synthesized electronic music in a style that imitates 8-bit era sound
- 8-Bit (studio), a Japanese animation studio
- 8-BIT, a character from the video game Brawl Stars
- Rob Fusari, music producer known as 8Bit

== See also ==
- 8-bit clean, a computer system that correctly handles 8-bit character encodings
- Bit (disambiguation)
