= Byton K-Byte =

Chinese electric car

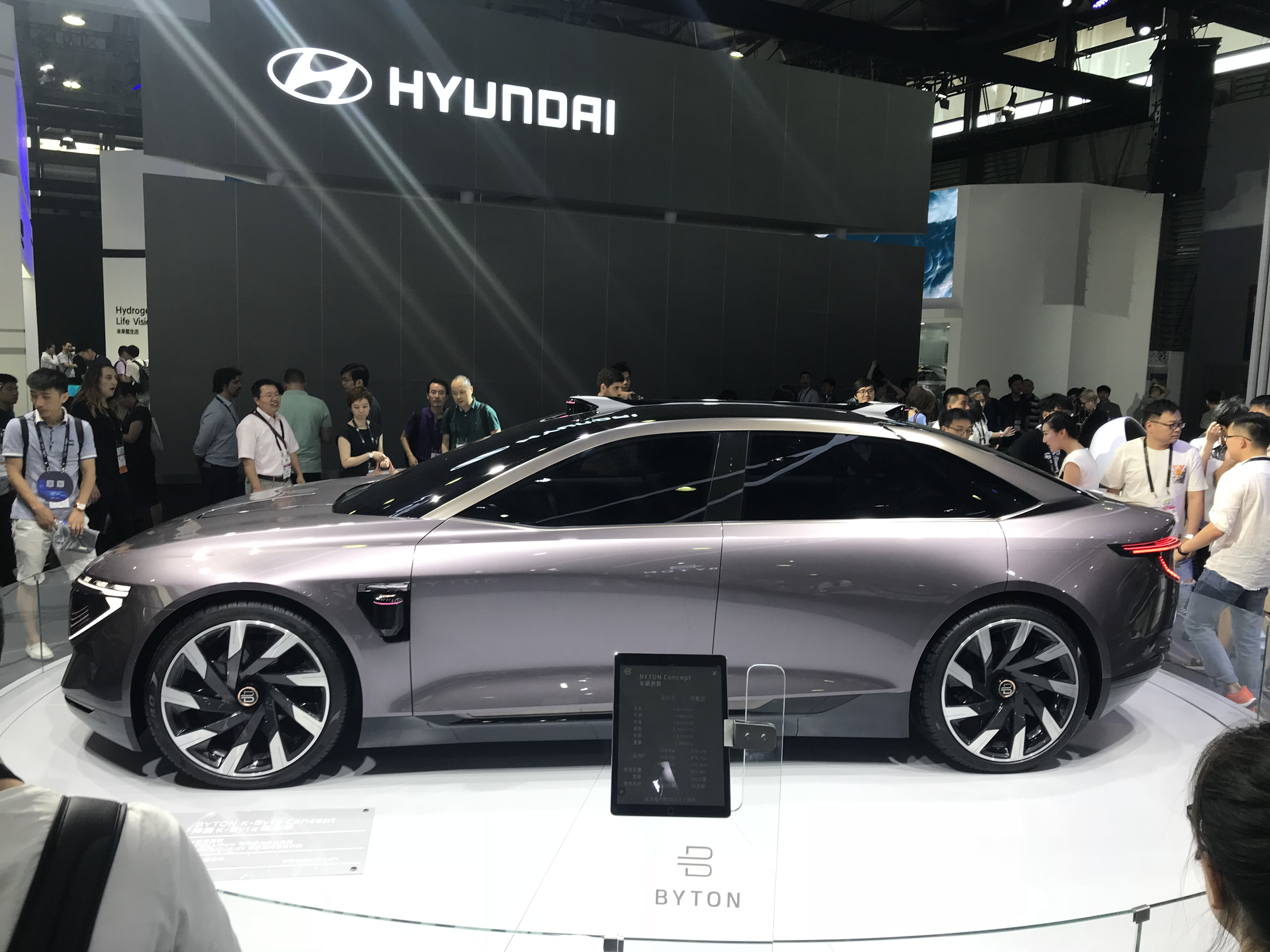

Overview
- Manufacturer: Byton
- Production: Cancelled
- Assembly: Guangdong, China

Body and chassis
- Class: Compact executive car
- Body style: 4-door sedan
- Layout: Dual-motor all-wheel drive

Powertrain
- Electric motor: 2x Permanent magnet synchronous motor
- Power output: 300 kW (402 hp; 408 PS) (4WD)
- Transmission: 1-speed fixed gear
- Battery: 95 kW·h CATL LiFePO4

The Byton K-Byte is an all-electric battery-powered sedan concept car by Chinese-German company Byton. It was publicly unveiled at the 2018 Consumer Electronics Show Asia CES, but neither the Byton K-Byte or M-Byte was manufactured due to the bankruptcy of Byton.

== Gallery ==
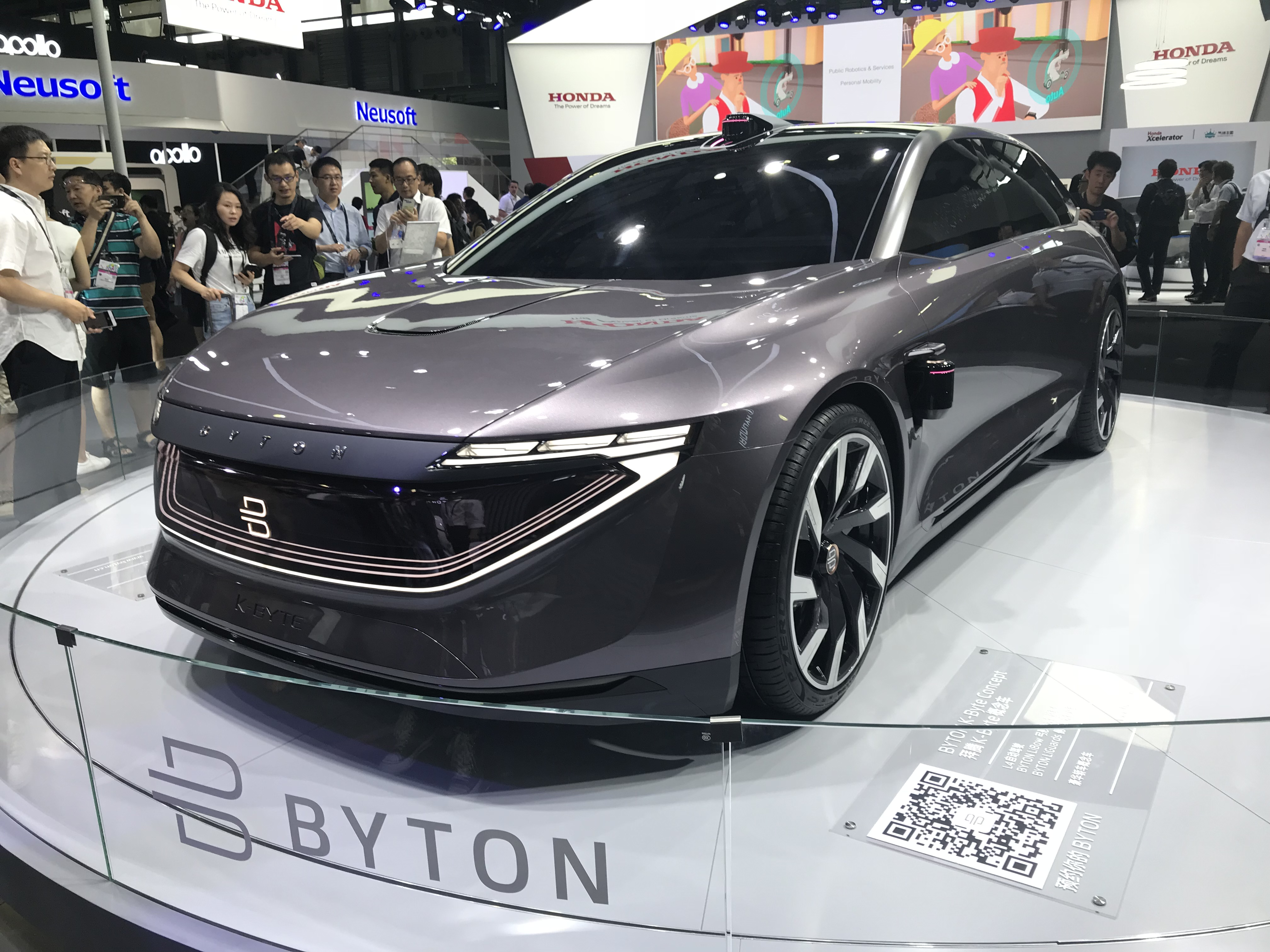
Front 3/4 View

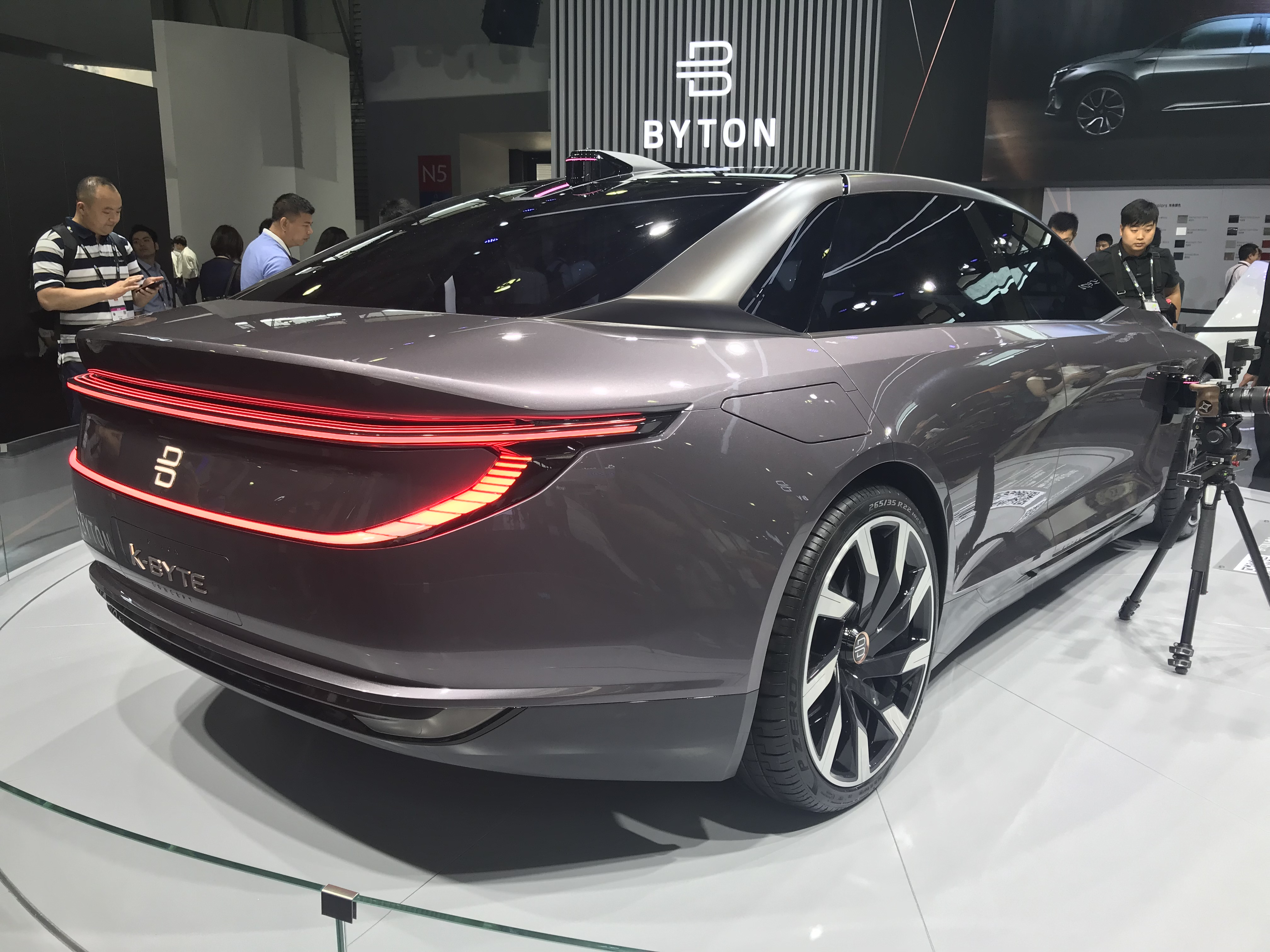
Rear 3/4 View

== See also ==
- Mercedes-Benz EQA
- Tesla Model S
- Tesla Model 3
- Polestar 2
- Xpeng P7
- Geometry A
- BYD Han EV
- BYD Qin Pro EV500
- Aion S
