= Nibble (disambiguation) =

A nibble (or nybble), in computing, is a four-bit unit of data.

Nibble, nibbles, nibbler, or nibblers may also refer to:

== Print media ==
- Nibble (magazine), a former publication for Apple II computer users
- Nibbles, a 20th-century American comic written by Malcolm Hancock

== Film and television ==
- Nibbles (film), a 2004 Canadian animated short by Christopher Hinton
- Nibbles (Tom and Jerry), also known as Tuffy, a cartoon mouse character in the Tom and Jerry series, and Jerry's younger cousin
- Nibbler (Futurama), a fictional character from the animated television series
- Nibbles Maplestick, a character from the 2025 animated Disney film Zootopia 2

== Computing and games ==
- Bit nibbler, a computer program for copying floppy disks
- Nibbler (video game), an arcade game
- Nibbles (video game), a simple video game and variant of Snake
- Nibblers (video game), a mobile tile-matching puzzle video game about fishes

== Other uses ==
- Nibbles, various small items of finger food
- Nibbler, or nibblers, a tool for cutting sheet metal with minimal distortion
- Nibbles Woodaway, alternate name of the Big Blue Bug, the giant termite mascot of New England Pest Control

== See also ==
- Nibble fish, or doctor fish
- Bite (disambiguation)
- Bit (disambiguation)
