= Louise Broni-Mensah =

British businesswoman

- Education: University of Birmingham
- Occupations: Founder & CEO of Shoobs

Louise Broni-Mensah is the founder of UK start-up Shoobs (pronounced Shubz), an event discovery and booking platform with an emphasis on music pioneered by Black people, which is often labelled as urban music. In 2019 the Financial Times named her as one of 100 most influential Black, Asian and minority ethnic leaders in technology.

== Early life and education ==
Broni-Mensah is the eldest of four children, born to Ghanaian parents who worked in finance. Her brother is Edwin Broni-Mensah, the founder of the charity GiveMeTap. She was raised in Edmonton, London, and found a passion for mathematics and music. At the age of 5, Broni-Mensah experienced prejudice at primary school, "I was met with shrills from other children during playtime, who couldn't contemplate the idea of playing with a black girl". In secondary school she was repeatedly denied access to higher level maths classes despite achieving the highest grades in the intermediate class. Broni-Mensah credits the actions of her parents, who escalated this issue to the headmistress, for enabling her to move classes.

Between 2000 and 2003 Broni-Mensah studied mathematical economics at the University of Birmingham, and continued her love of music by working for the radio station Burn FM as a breakfast DJ and drive-time DJ. She took on a role for Sony music and Relentless Records to promote events and artists on campus. She was inspired by P. Diddy and his route into music through taking on a College Marketing Rep position for Columbia Records. Her initial contact with Sony was to cold-call "a random number I found on Google".

== Career ==
Broni-Mensah worked for UBS Investment Bank as a junior trader after university, where she found the day-to-day work lacking in excitement. In interviews, Broni-Mensah reflects on the pressure she felt to pursue a technical degree as her mother "wasn't too keen on me doing something like media studies". In hindsight, she has no regrets on her career journey despite having to work a second job in her spare time as a manager of a hip-hop artist and event organiser. She took this longer route into the media business because she felt that there was not enough support, such as financial backing, for inner city young adults born to immigrant parents to take risks.

=== Shoobs ===
Broni-Mensah was inspired to start Shoobs after spending many days searching for events for a night out, but found many events, especially those held on a regular basis, required tickets to be purchased in-person, or only advertised using flyers. In particular, she found promotion of black music events lacking. She began working on Shoobs as a solo founder in 2010 - at the time, Shoobs was the only black entertainment event ticketing site in the UK. Shoobs is a slang term for party. The vision for Shoobs is to "build a community of people who come to us to figure out how to spend their Friday and Saturday nights”.

Broni-Mensah secured funding from the Bright Ideas Trust owned by Tim Campbell, the first winner of the UK TV programme The Apprentice, using the fund to create the first version of the online platform. She would then win the Shell LiveWIRE Grand Idea award in 2010.

In 2014 Broni-Mensah left London to join Y Combinator, a startup accelerator where she received support from Geoff Ralston and Aaron Harris. She became the first Black female entrepreneur to secure capital from a Silicon Valley seed fund. In 2014 Shoobs had 1027 organisers signed up, with more than 100,000 tickets sold in 2013.

In 2018 Broni-Mensah was interviewed by the BBC as part of their series CEO Secrets. In 2019 the Evening Standard interviewed Broni-Mensah as part of their Women Tech Charge series.

In 2019, the BBC interviewed Louise about her expansion plans for Shoobs.

She is the alumnus of the Ernst and Young Winning Women Programme and the Morgan Stanley Innovation Lab in New York.

On the subject of the advantages or disadvantages of being a female founder, Broni-Mensah comments "I am a solo non-technical first-time female founder from London, so it is difficult to pinpoint which one of those attributes has been the most disadvantageous!". On the subject of racism in the music industry, Broni-Mensah has spoken out about the treatment of black event organisers and attendees, having witnessed for example, the actions of bouncers who disproportionally turn away black men from events.

Broni-Mensah has plans to internationalise Shoobs into African markets following the growth of African music such as Afrobeats and Afroswing into the UK and across the world. In contrast with early concerns that this market would be niche, Broni-Mensah states "Often when you are doing something really groundbreaking you've got to be ahead of the curve and that's what we’ve done at Shoobs so it's great to see how well Urban is being received now.'

== Awards ==
In 2019 Broni-Mensah was named in the Financial Times and Inclusive Boards list as one of the 100 most influential black, Asian and minority ethnic leaders in technology.

Broni-Mensah was recognised as one of Britain's most influential Black people under 40 by Powerful Media.
