= Megabite =

Megabite may refer to:

- Megabites, a feature column, restaurant reviews in the Hong Kong newspaper bc magazine
- Megabite Project, an online companion event to the 2002 edition of the Next Wave Festival
- MegaBITE, volume 3 of the manga Adventure Kid
- Megabite (A Split-Second album), 1995
- Megabite (P.E.A.C.E album), 2004
- IDT Megabite Cafe, cybercafe and sushibar in NYC

== See also ==
- Megabyte (disambiguation)
- Megabyte (MB) 10^{6} bytes
- Mebibyte (MiB) 2^{20} bytes
- Megabit (Mbit) 10^{6} bits
- Mebibit (Mibit) 2^{20} bits
- Mega (disambiguation)
- Bite (disambiguation)
