= Bite (disambiguation) =

A bite is a wound received from the mouth of an animal or human; it is also a verb describing that action.

Bite or BITE may also refer to:

== Related to biting ==
- Biting, the process of chewing or mastication, whereby food is crushed and ground by teeth
- Occlusion (dentistry), called "bite" (e.g., as in "overbite" or "underbite"), the contact between teeth

== Arts, entertainment, and media ==
=== Music ===
- Bite (Altered Images album), a 1983 album by Altered Images
- Bite (A Giant Dog album), a 2023 album by A Giant Dog
- Bites (album), a 1985 album by Skinny Puppy
- Bite, a 1990 album by Ned's Atomic Dustbin

=== Stage productions ===
- Bite (show), a topless vampire show at the Stratosphere Las Vegas in Las Vegas, Nevada, United States
- BITE, an acronym for Barbican International Theatre Events at the Barbican Centre, London

=== Other arts, entertainment, and media ===
- Bite (film), a 2015 horror film
- BiteTV, a Canadian television channel
- The Beast in the East, a professional wrestling event produced by WWE

== Science and technology ==
- BiTE, an acronym for bi-specific T-cell engagers, a class of specific modified antibodies
- BITE Model (Behavior, Information, Thought, and Emotional control), a model to describe control methods used by cults
- Built-in test equipment, or BITE, a concept in aviation

== Other uses ==
- The Bite, or the Adelaide Bite, a baseball team now known as the Adelaide Giants
- Bitė Group, a Lithuanian telecommunication company
- Bitė, Lithuanian surname

== See also ==
- Bight (disambiguation)
- Bit (disambiguation)
- Bitten (disambiguation)
- Byte (disambiguation)
