= Srul =

Srul (Yiddish: סראָל) is an Ashkenazi given name, a diminutive of Israel. Notable people with the name include:

- Srul Bronshtein, Romanian and Soviet Yiddish-language poet
- Srul Herș Moscovici, birth name of Serge Moscovici, French social psychologist
- Srul Irving Glick, Canadian composer
- Srul Moshevich Blank, birth name of the maternal grandfather of Vladimir Lenin

== See also ==
- Srulik
