= Carsten Breitfeld =

German car industry executive

Dr Carsten Breitfeld is a German car industry executive. After a twenty-year career with BMW, he then worked for a number of EV start ups including the Chinese-German Byton and more recently the Californian Faraday Future.

== Career ==
Breitfeld worked with BMW for twenty years and was part of the BMW i division, including working on the BMW i8 as vice president and Head of BMW i8 Program.

After leaving BMW, Breitfeld co-founded the Chinese-German Byton in July 2016, originally called Future Mobility Corp and was funded by Tencent. He left the company in 2019 and joined Faraday Future as CEO. He was removed as CEO in November 2022.
