= Byton M-Byte =

Chinese electric car

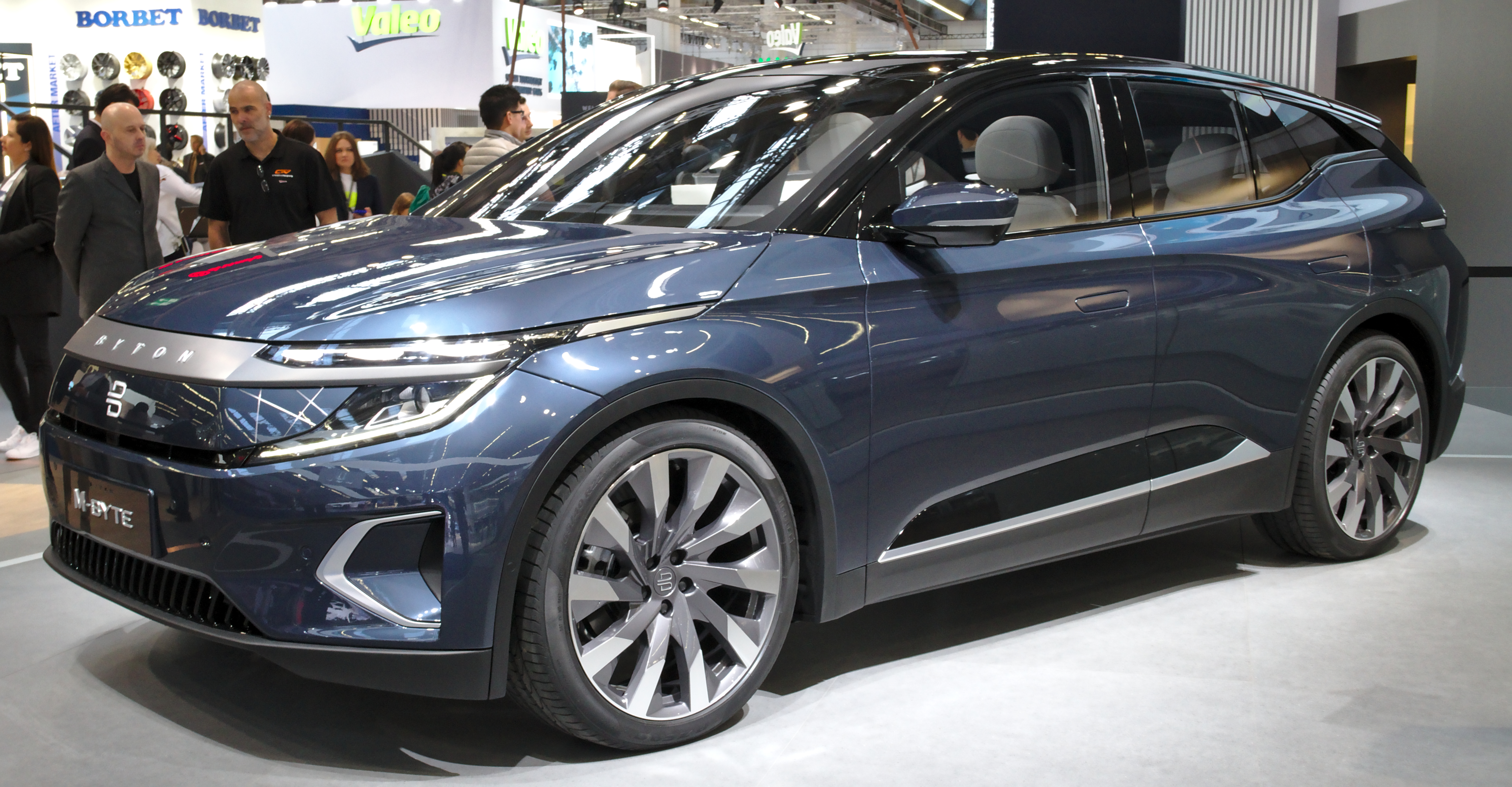
- Production Byton M-Byte at the 2019 IAA

Overview
- Manufacturer: Byton
- Production: 1 prototype built

Body and chassis
- Class: Subcompact executive car/Compact crossover SUV
- Body style: 5-door SUV
- Layout: Rear-motor, rear-wheel drive; Dual-motor all-wheel drive

Powertrain
- Electric motor: 2x Permanent magnet synchronous motor
- Power output: 200 kW (268 hp; 272 PS) (RWD); 300 kW (402 hp; 408 PS) (4WD)
- Transmission: 1-speed fixed gear
- Battery: 72 or 95 kW·h CATL LiFePO4
- Plug-in charging: Base model: 120 kW DC, 11 kW AC; Long range model: 150 kW DC, 11 kW AC; Optional: 22 kW onboard AC charger

Dimensions
- Wheelbase: 2,950 mm (116.1 in)
- Length: 4,875 mm (191.9 in)
- Width: 2,195 mm (86.4 in)
- Height: 1,665 mm (65.6 in)

The Byton M-Byte was an all-electric battery-powered SUV 2018 concept car from Byton. It was scheduled for production in 2019 but the company encountered difficulties and the car did not go on sale and the company ceased trading in 2023.

== Overview ==
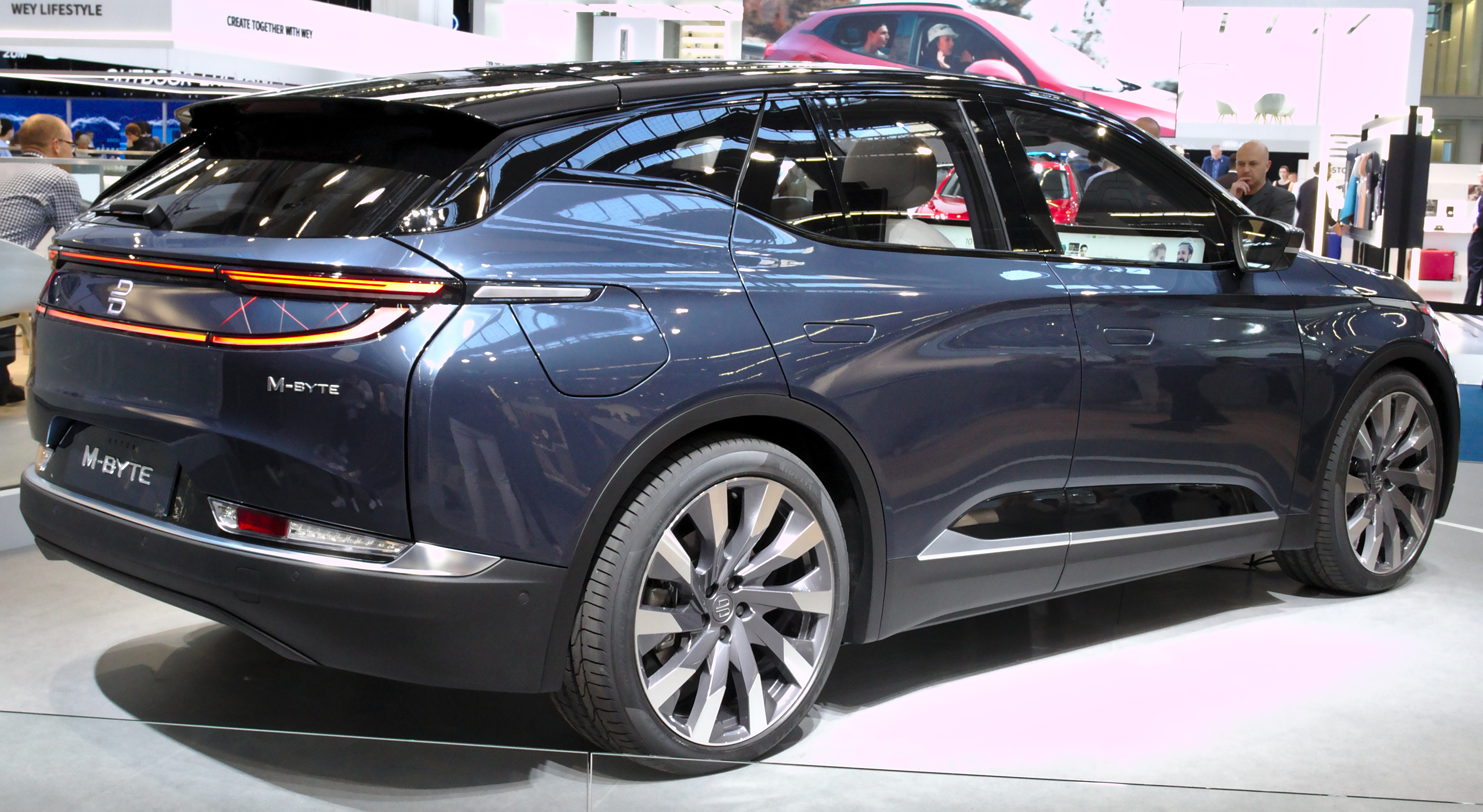
Rear view

The Byton M-Byte was publicly unveiled at the 2018 Consumer Electronics Show. The car was originally called the Concept, however, this was revised to M-Byte, when the K-Byte was unveiled. It had a 4K curved 48-inch infotainment display, 7-inch display on steering wheel with integrated airbag and was to have in-car gesture control technology.

Mass production was expected in mid-2019 and arrival in the United States by 2020. It was expected to have a starting price of US$45,000 and 250-mile (400 km) range upgradable to 323 miles (520 km).

The M-Byte received an iF Product Design Award in 2020, and received a Red Dot award in 2021 for its integrated 17-speaker Harman Kardon audio system.

However, Byton went bankrupt and its work with manufacturing partner Foxconn was halted indefinitely.
