= Tim Molyneux =

American theatre producer

- Born: Mobile, Alabama
- Occupations: Theatrical producer, actor, entrepreneur, director, writer, singer
- Known for: Bite – a theatrical production

Tim Molyneux (born 1969) is an American actor, singer, writer, director, and show producer of musical and theatrical productions. He is best known for producing and writing the song and dance vampire production show Bite which showed at the Stratosphere Hotel & Casino in Las Vegas for an eight-year run, and for his cruise ship productions. He is the founder of "Molyneux Entertainment" which has premiered at least 14 other shows around the world. Tim Molyneux has been producing live entertainment since 1989.

== Early life and education ==
Molyneux grew up in Mobile, Alabama with his parents, who both worked for the telephone company. Molyneux started his career, at only five years old, as a singer in his grandfather's Pentecostal church. He sang a variety of music styles including gospel, musical theater, country, jazz, rhythm and blues. He began studying opera at age 13.

Molyneux attended Theodore High School and continued to develop his opera career. In 1986, at the age of 16, Molyneux attended a summer classical music program at Florida State University where he was mentored by Dr. Andre Thomas. Molyneux was awarded an Opera Vocal Performance scholarship to Florida State University.

Molyneux later obtained a Bachelor of Science Degree in Communications with a minor in Commercial Music from Belmont University in Nashville, TN.

== Career ==
After FSU, Molyneux moved to San Antonio where he pursued his performing and singing careers. He performed the lead role in Opryland USA's "Rockin At Rockville High" in San Antonio's Fiesta Texas Theme Park.

In 1997, Molyneux was hired by Celebrity Cruises on their ship, The Mercury, to perform as a headline comic, a cappella group. After this successful run as a performer, he was later contracted as a producer and director to create and manage other a cappella groups for Celebrity Cruises and Royal Caribbean Cruises, Inc., Crystal Cruises and the Queen Mary II. His a cappella productions are still used on the Celebrity Cruises fleet, Royal Caribbean cruise line and the Queen Mary II.

=== Productions ===
Molyneux wrote, directed, arranged the music and produced Bite, a classic rock vampire show that spent over eight years on the Las Vegas Strip at the Stratosphere Hotel & Casino. The musical production ran at the venue from Friday 13 August 2004 until 31 October 2012. Bite was the first Las Vegas production that explored the vampire concept. Molyneux wrote, composed and produced other shows including All In: The Poker Musical which premiered in 2008. This musical was the first to focus on the theme of poker. Its debut was at the Rio All Suites Hotel and Casino in Las Vegas during the 2008 World Series Of Poker.

Molyneux also created the "Repertory Theater At Sea" entertainment program which produced a rotation of theatrical works: "a selection of renowned comedic and light dramatic works performed by troupes of professional actors" for Crystal Cruises. These were the first repertory type productions to be presented at sea on a cruise line.

=== Performances ===
Molyneux is also known as an actor, singer and headline act He has performed the role of Jean Valjean in Les Misérables and Nicely Nicely Johnson in Guys and Dolls and has recently recorded with Grammy nominated producer, Pat Thrall and performed with Grammy Award winner David Foster. The Molyneux headline show From Mozart to Motown plays at casinos, hotels and cruise ship theaters.

=== Other ventures ===
Molyneux is also a performance coach. He founded the Show Doctor business in 2000. He works with performing and recording artists, record labels, management companies and agencies.

Molyneux currently has two patents (US 9077865 B1) and (US 8,120,655 B1) granted and multiple patents pending for virtual reality, augmented reality and live performance technologies. The Molyneux patents are systems and methods for viewers to switch viewing perspectives during a live performance of any kind and/or have the ability to alter or augment live performances in real time.
