= Bitė =

Bitė is a Lithuanian surname. Notable people with the surname include:

- Adomas Bitė (1836–1884), Lithuanian peasant
- Gabrielė Petkevičaitė-Bitė (1861–1943), Lithuanian educator, writer, and activist

== See also ==
- Bitė Group
