= Bight =

The word bight is derived from Old English byht (“bend, angle, corner; bay, bight”). In modern English, bight may refer to:

- Bight (geography), recess of a coast, bay, or other curved feature
- Bight (knot), a curved section, slack part, or loop in rope (used in the terminology of knot-tying)

== See also ==
- Canto Bight, a fictional city in Star Wars: The Last Jedi
- Bite (disambiguation)
- Byte (disambiguation)
- Byte, a unit of digital information in computing and telecommunications
