= Bucharest Yiddish Studio Theater =

Experimental Yiddish theater in Romania

The Bucharest Yiddish Studio Theater (Yiddish: Bukareshter Idishe Teater-Studie, BITS) was a short-lived, experimental Yiddish theater founded in Bucharest, Romania in 1930, under the leadership of Jacob Sternberg.

Their first production, in January 1930, was I.L. Peretz's A Night in the Old Town, also known as A Night in the Old Marketplace — that is to say, in the Jewish ghetto. Dimineaţa said of this play that it "does not have a subject in the conventional sense of the word" but is instead "the dream of a cold night", moving smoothly between the world of the living and that of the dead. The play was a hit and a critical success. Tudor Arghezi, who did not speak Yiddish, praised Sternberg highly for the production, and for the structure of the performance, whose blend of "order and disorder" he described as "inexplicable, like Beethoven's music".

Arghezi also remarked of A Night in the Old Town, "you are either open to this, or you are not". Many were not. Barbu Lăzăreanu, a prominent Jewish intellectual and ethnologist, said that BITS "altered the Peretz's work into an orgy of orori osifere [roughly, 'graveyard horrors'] and monosyllabism that creates an unstoppable impression of the lugubrious and hyper-transcendental."

Their subsequent production of Sholem Aleichem's Der gfarkishefter Shnayder (The Bewitched Tailor) was described by the Literarishe Bleter as "a unified and enchanting spectacle of prose, poetry, and song" incorporating new songs "full of hope", but also music from the synagogue and popular song, "but on all this it embroiders a sad mirth, realist-simple and demented-symbolist comedy, which ends with optimistic rhymes — the moral of the comedy — sung by the comedians themselves."
