= BYD Han =

Full-size sedan

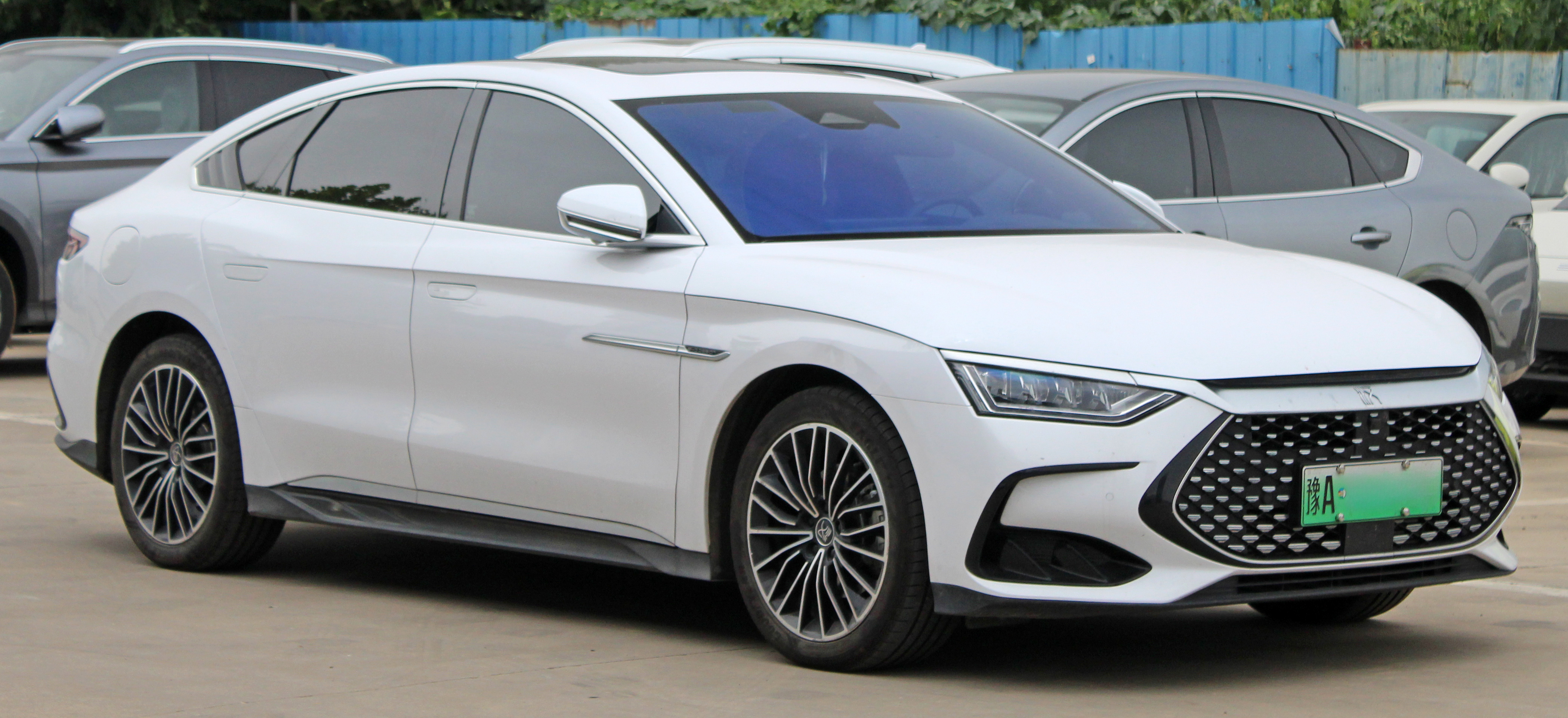
- 2023 BYD Han DM-i

Overview
- Manufacturer: BYD Auto
- Production: 2020–present

Body and chassis
- Class: Full-size car (E-segment)
- Body style: 4-door sedan

Chronology
- Predecessor: BYD G6

The BYD Han (Chinese: 比亚迪汉) is a series of full-size sedan (E-segment) manufactured by the Chinese manufacturer BYD Auto since 2020. It is a flagship model of BYD's Dynasty Series passenger vehicles, and was named after the Han Dynasty, the first golden age of Imperial China.

Since its introduction, the Han has been available as a battery electric vehicle marketed as Han EV and several plug-in hybrid variants. The Han EV was notable for being the earliest Chinese car that is capable of a 0–100 km/h (0–62 mph) acceleration in around 3 seconds. In 2022, BYD refreshed the Han by replacing the Han DM plug-in hybrid with two variants, the Han DM-i as a efficiency-oriented model and the Han DM-p as a performance-oriented model.

In 2025, BYD introduced the Han L, a slightly larger sedan with an all-new ground-up design, updated equipment and more powerful powertrain. It is also available in three powertrain options, the DM-i, DM-p, and EV.

In January 2026, BYD teased the Han 9, the successor of the first-generation Han. It was later renamed to Dahan, alternatively known in English as the Great Han.

== Concept ==
The Han was preceded by the E-SEED GT concept car, presented at the 2019 Shanghai Auto Show. The concept car is a coupe that features gullwing doors, an all-wheel drive layout, and a 0–100 km/h (0–62 mph) time of less than 4 seconds.

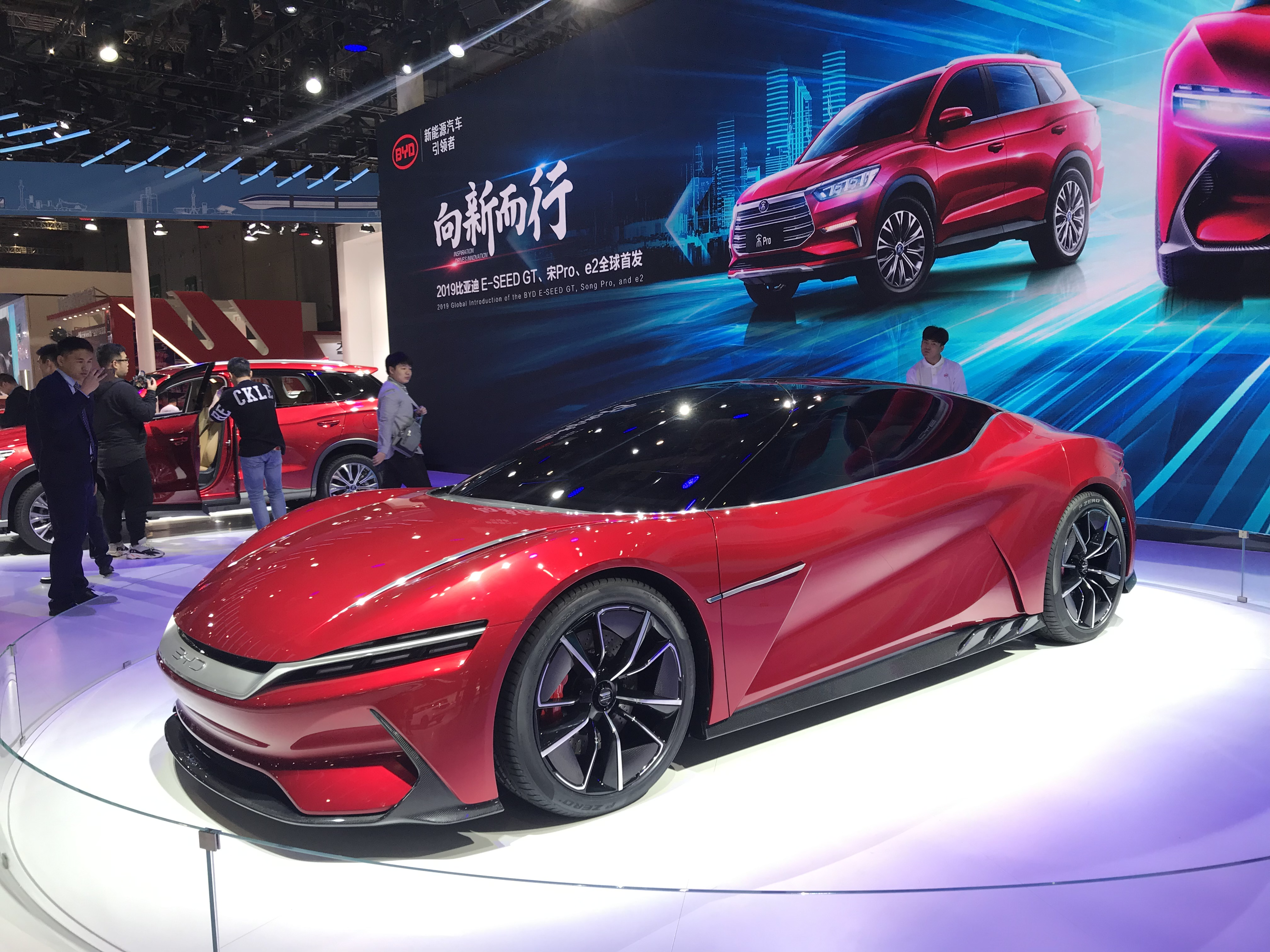
E-SEED GT concept that previewed the production sedan

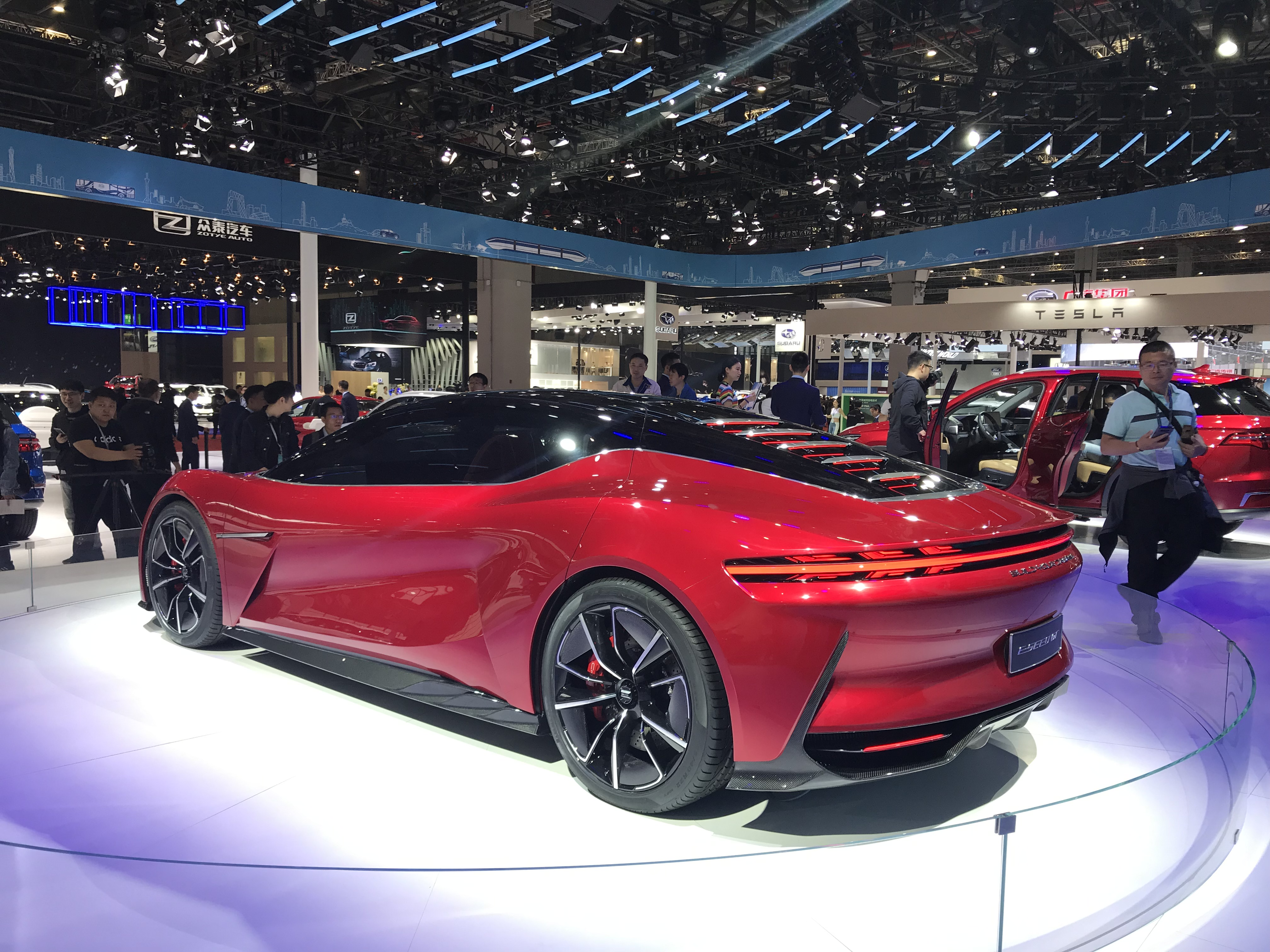
E-SEED GT concept (rear)

== First generation (2020) ==
First generation
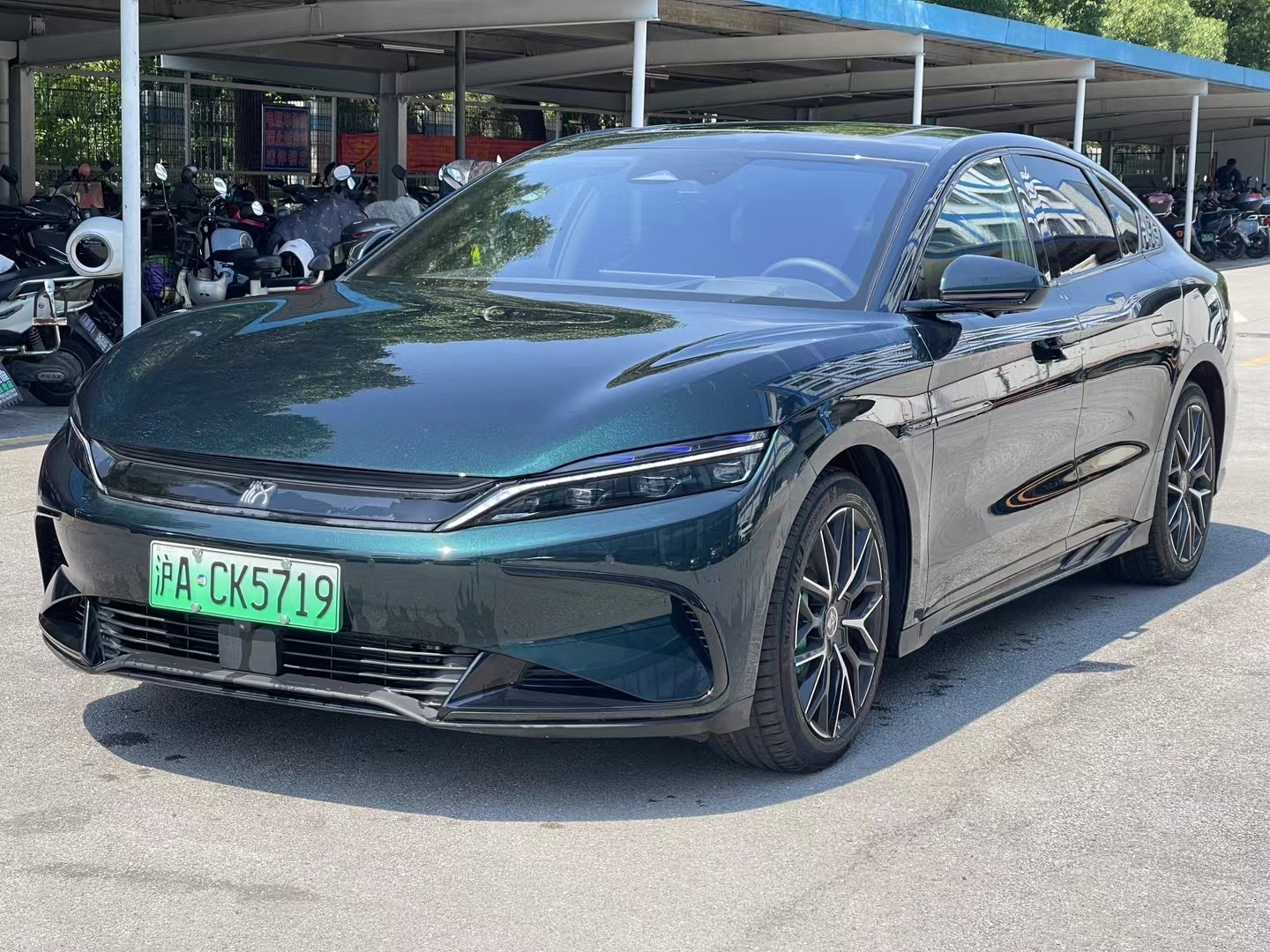
- BYD Han EV (facelift)

Overview
- Model code: HC
- Also called: BYD e9 (2021–2026); Linghui e9 (2026–present)
- Production: 2020–present (Han); 2021–present (e9)
- Assembly: China: Shenzhen, Guangdong
- Designer: Under the lead of Wolfgang Egger

Body and chassis
- Layout: Front-engine, front-motor, front-wheel drive (Han DM-i); Front-engine, dual-motor, all-wheel drive (Han DM/DM-p); Front-motor, front-wheel-drive (Han EV); Dual-motor, four-wheel-drive (Han EV AWD)
- Platform: e-Platform 2.0 (Han EV); DM 3.0 platform (Han DM); DM-i 4.0 platform (Han DM-i, 2022–2024); DM-i 5.0 platform (Han DM-i, 2024–present)
- Related: BYD Seal 07 DM-i

Powertrain
- Engine: Petrol plug-in hybrid: 1.5 L BYD476ZQA I4 turbo; 2.0 L BYD487ZQB I4 turbo
- Electric motor: Permanent magnet synchronous
- Transmission: 6-speed DCT (Han DM); E-CVT (Han DM-i/DM-p); 1-speed A/T (Han BEV)
- Hybrid drivetrain: Plug-in hybrid (Han DM/DM-i/DM-p)

Dimensions
- Wheelbase: 2,920 mm (115.0 in)
- Length: 4,960–4,995 mm (195.3–196.7 in)
- Width: 1,910 mm (75.2 in)
- Height: 1,495 mm (58.9 in)

The first pictures of the production model BYD Han were released in January 2020, prior to its introduction at the planned Beijing Auto Show in April 2020. The model went on sale in China in July 2020.

Since 2021, a version dedicated for ride-hailing purposes is available as the BYD e9.

=== Han DM ===
The Han DM ("dual mode") is the plug-in hybrid variant of the BYD Han. The Han DM is developed on the four-wheel drive DM3 platform, with a plug-in hybrid drivetrain that produces 180 kW (241 hp; 245 PS) from its rear permanent-magnet synchronous motor and 141 kW (189 hp) from the 2.0-litre turbocharged petrol engine, bringing the combined output power to 321 kW (430 hp; 436 PS). It has a 6-speed dual-clutch automatic transmission and can accelerate from 0 to 100 km/h (0 to 62 mph) in 4.7 seconds.

Based on the NEDC driving cycle, the combined fuel consumption is 1.4 L/100 km (71.4 km/L; 201.8 mpg_{‑imp}; 168.0 mpg_{‑US}), and the fuel consumption of the internal combustion engine is 5.9 L/100 km (16.9 km/L; 47.9 mpg_{‑imp}; 39.9 mpg_{‑US}).

There are two versions of Han DM: the basic Luxury model (豪华型) and a more equipped Majestic model (尊贵型) with upgraded stereo systems and extra comfort options.

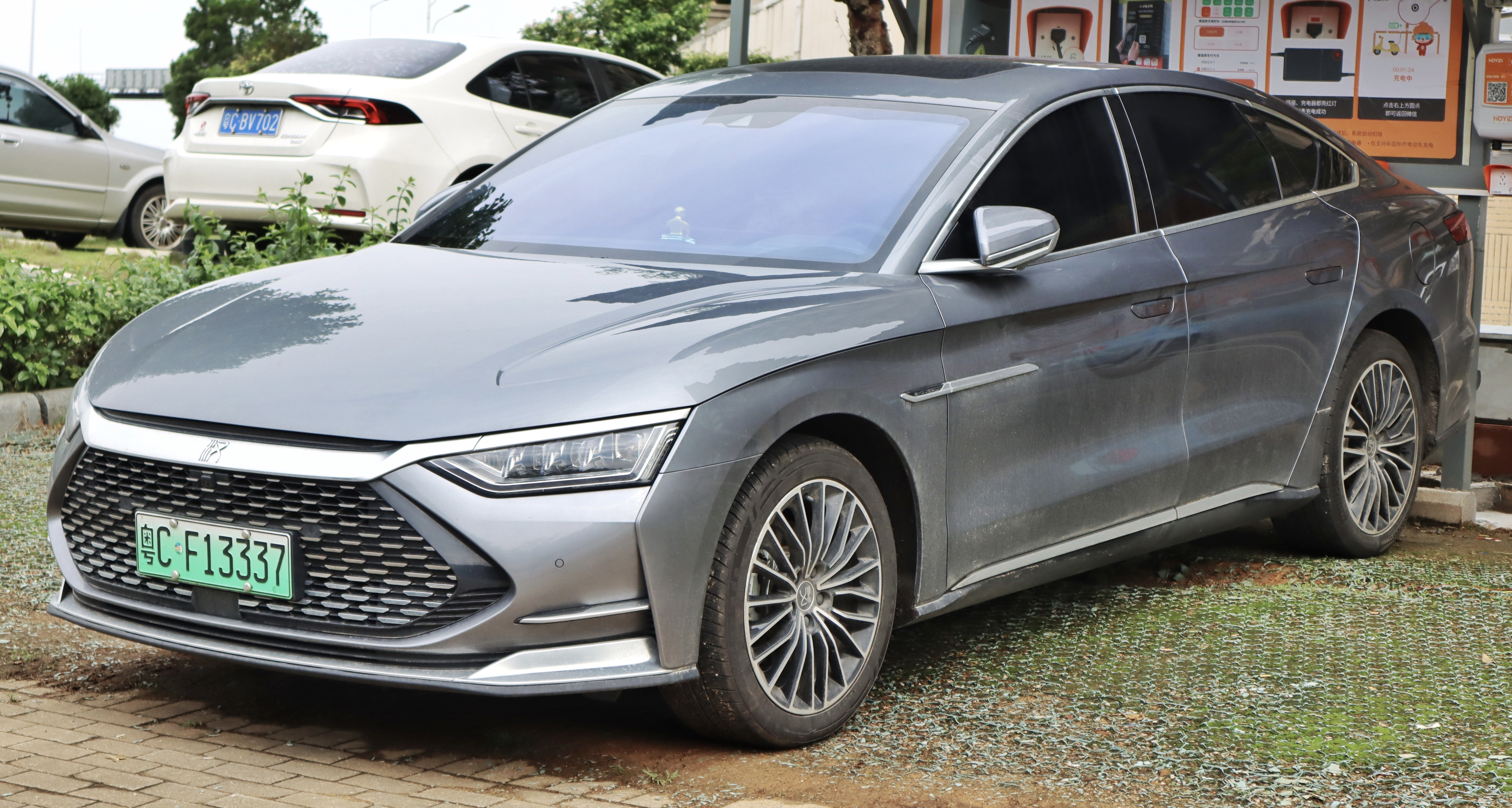
Han DM

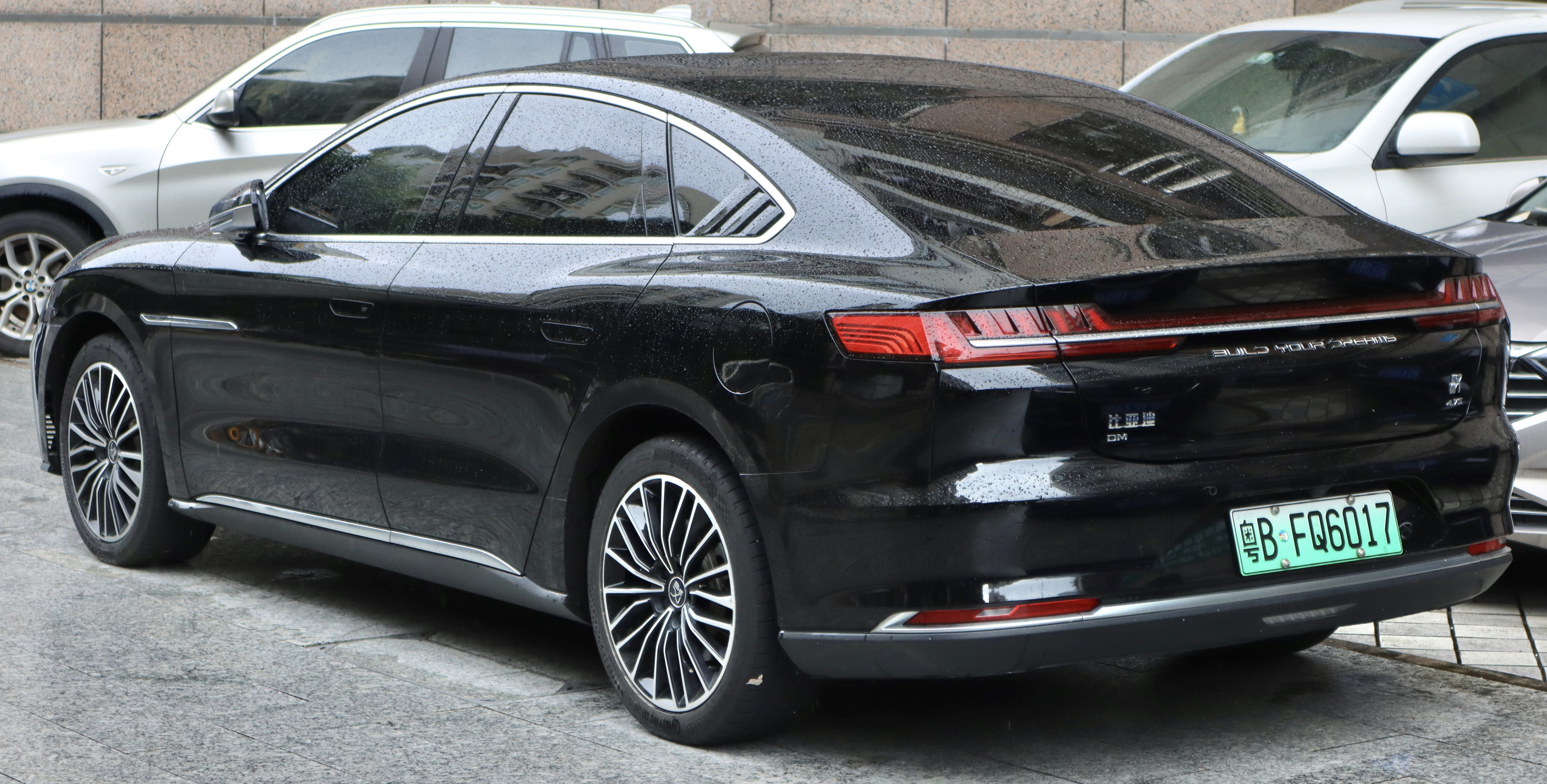
Rear view

==== Powertrain ====
Type	Engine			Trans.	Battery	Layout	Electric motor			Combined system		0–100 km/h (0–62 mph) (claimed)	Electric range (claimed)	Calendar years
Type	Type	Power	Torque	Trans.	Battery	Layout	Type	Power	Torque	Power	Torque	0–100 km/h (0–62 mph) (claimed)	NEDC	Calendar years
DM 4WD	BYD487ZQB 1,999 cc (2.0 L) I4 turbo	141 kW (189 hp)	320 N⋅m (32.6 kg⋅m; 236 lb⋅ft)	6-speed DCT	15.2 kWh lithium-ion	AWD	Rear PMSM	145 kW (194 hp)	316 N⋅m (32.2 kg⋅m; 233 lb⋅ft)	321 kW (430 hp)	650 N⋅m (66.3 kg⋅m; 479 lb⋅ft)	4.7 seconds	81 km (50 mi)	2020–2021

=== Han EV ===
The Han EV is the battery electric variant of the BYD Han, and all its models are designed with a 76.9 kWh battery pack, which claims to be rapid-chargeable from 30 to 80% in 25 minutes. The Han EV utilises a new proprietary lithium iron phosphate (LFP) battery design which BYD dubbed the blade battery, claiming to take up less space than a conventional LFP battery of the same energy capacity.

The base model Han EV, called the Extended Range model (超长续航版), is front-wheel drive with a reported all-electric range (NEDC) of 605 km (376 mi). It is powered by a 163 kW (219 hp; 222 PS) electric motor that can accelerate from 0 to 100 km/h (0 to 62 mph) in 7.9 seconds. There are two versions of this base model: the basic Luxury model (豪华型), while the more featured Majestic model with extra advanced driver-assistance systems, blind spot detection, better stereo systems and other comfort options.

The Flagship model (旗舰型) is four-wheel drive with an additional 200 kW (268 hp; 272 PS) rear motor, bringing the total power output to 363 kW (487 hp; 494 PS). It reportedly can accelerate from 0 to 100 km/h (0 to 62 mph) in 3.9 seconds. It is rated at a NEDC all-electric range of 550 km (340 mi) with more added features than the Majestic model.

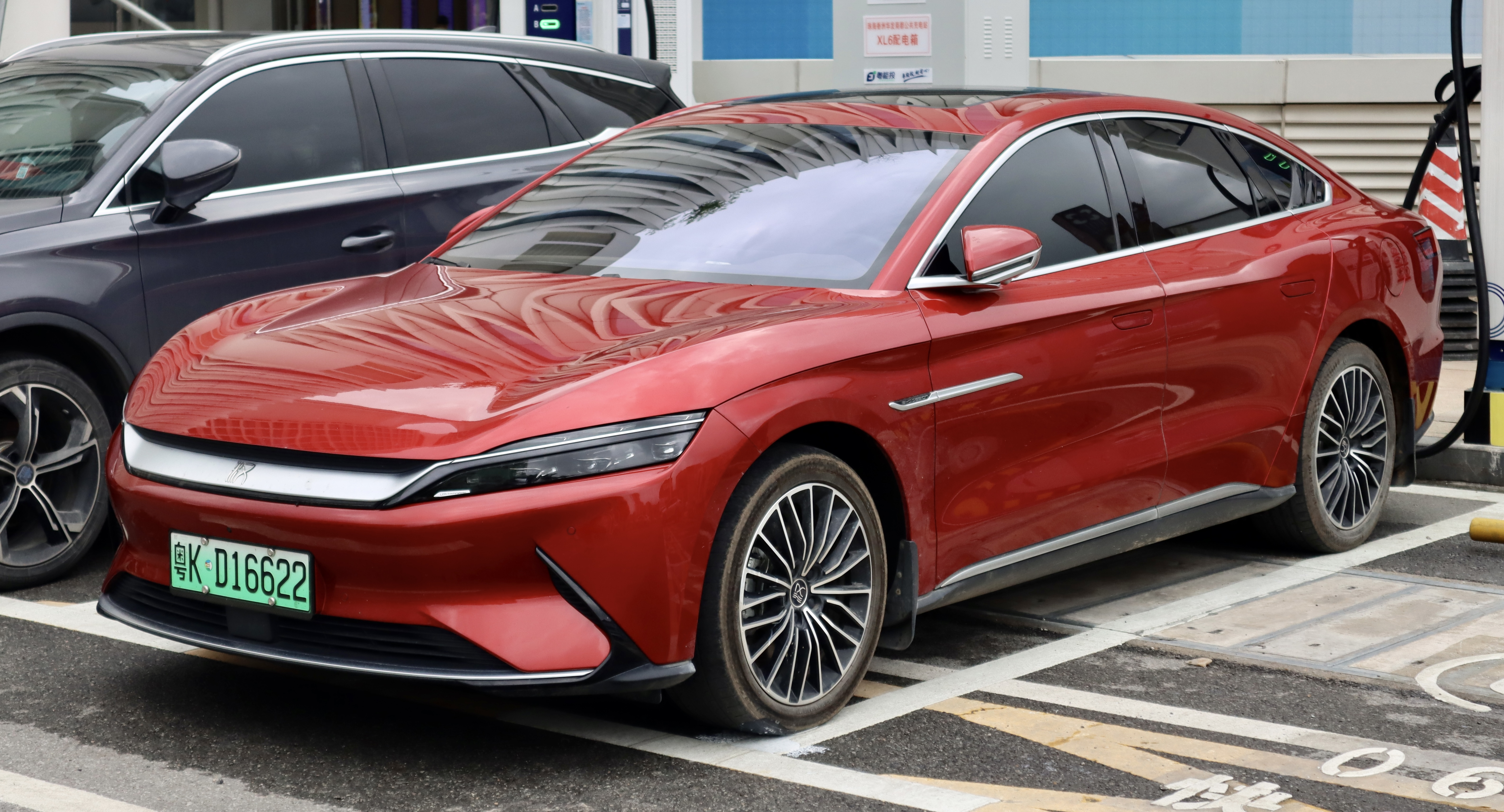
2020–2022 Han EV (pre-facelift)

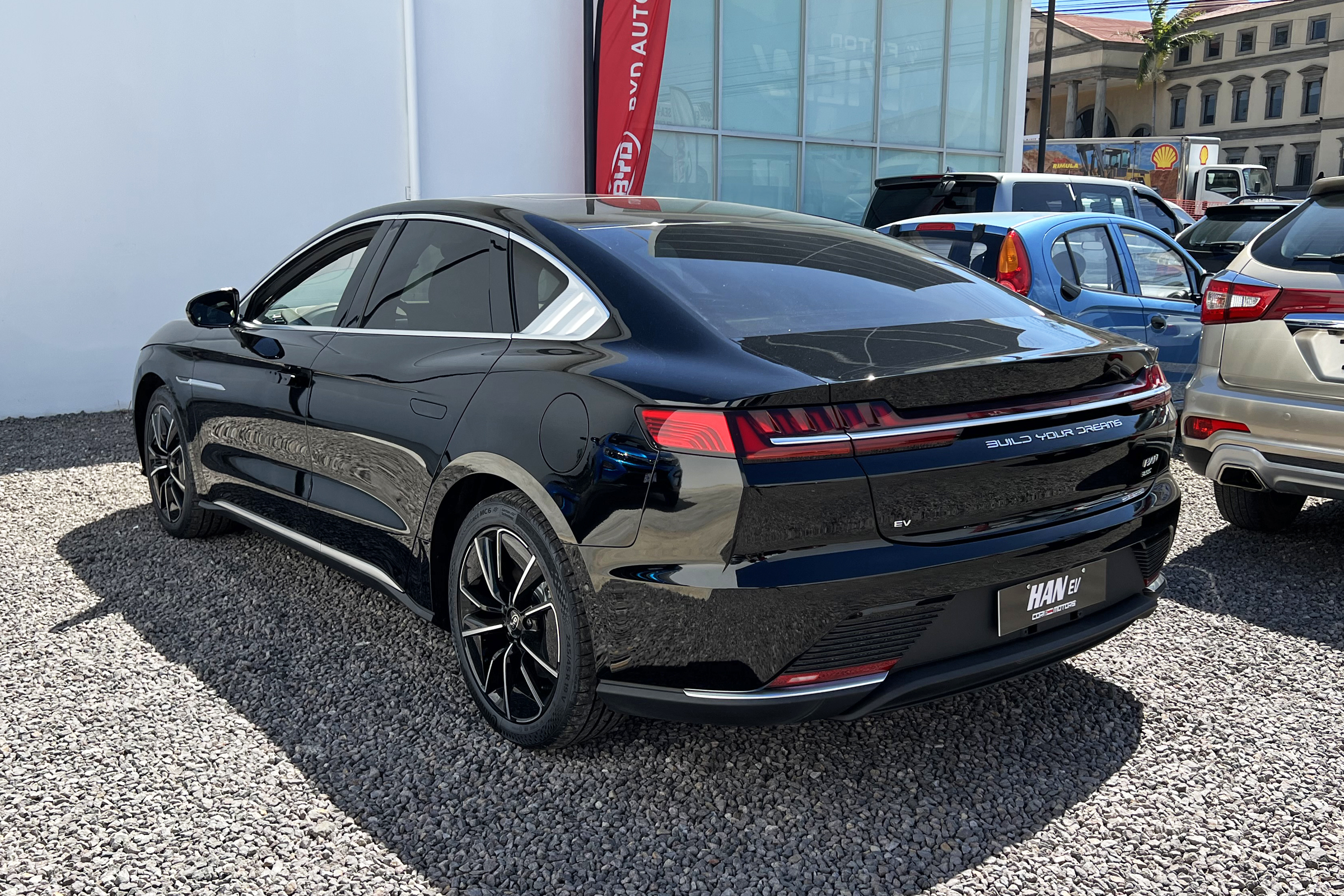
Rear view

==== Powertrain ====
Type	Battery	Layout	Electric motor		Power	Torque	0–100 km/h (0–62 mph) (claimed)	Range (claimed)	Calendar years
Type	Battery	Layout	Electric motor		Power	Torque	0–100 km/h (0–62 mph) (claimed)	CLTC	Calendar years
Standard	64.8 kWh LFP Blade battery	FWD	Front	PMSM	163 kW (219 hp)	330 N⋅m (33.7 kg⋅m; 243 lb⋅ft)	7.9 seconds	506 km (314 mi)	2021–2022
605 km	76.9 kWh LFP Blade battery	FWD	Front	PMSM	163 kW (219 hp)	330 N⋅m (33.7 kg⋅m; 243 lb⋅ft)	7.9 seconds	605 km (376 mi)	2020–2022
550 km Flagship AWD	85.44 kWh LFP Blade battery	AWD	Front	PMSM	163 kW (219 hp)	330 N⋅m (33.7 kg⋅m; 243 lb⋅ft)	3.9 seconds	550 km (342 mi)	2020–2022
550 km Flagship AWD	85.44 kWh LFP Blade battery	AWD	Rear	PMSM	200 kW (268 hp)	350 N⋅m (35.7 kg⋅m; 258 lb⋅ft)	3.9 seconds	550 km (342 mi)	2020–2022
550 km Flagship AWD	85.44 kWh LFP Blade battery	AWD	Combined:		363 kW (487 hp)	680 N⋅m (69.3 kg⋅m; 502 lb⋅ft)	3.9 seconds	550 km (342 mi)	2020–2022

=== 2022 facelift ===
BYD released the updated versions of the Han, which includes the Han EV Founding Edition, Han EV Green Edition, Han DM-i and Han DM-p in April 2022.

==== Han DM-i and Han DM-p ====
The Han DM-i is the facelift replacing the original Han DM and focuses on fuel economy with four versions available, three of which have a battery range of 121 km (75 mi) and one with a battery range of 242 km (150 mi). The DM-i model has a combined range of up to 1,300 km (808 mi). The Han DM-p (p for 'performance') has a 0–100 km/h (0–62 mph) acceleration time of 3.7 seconds.

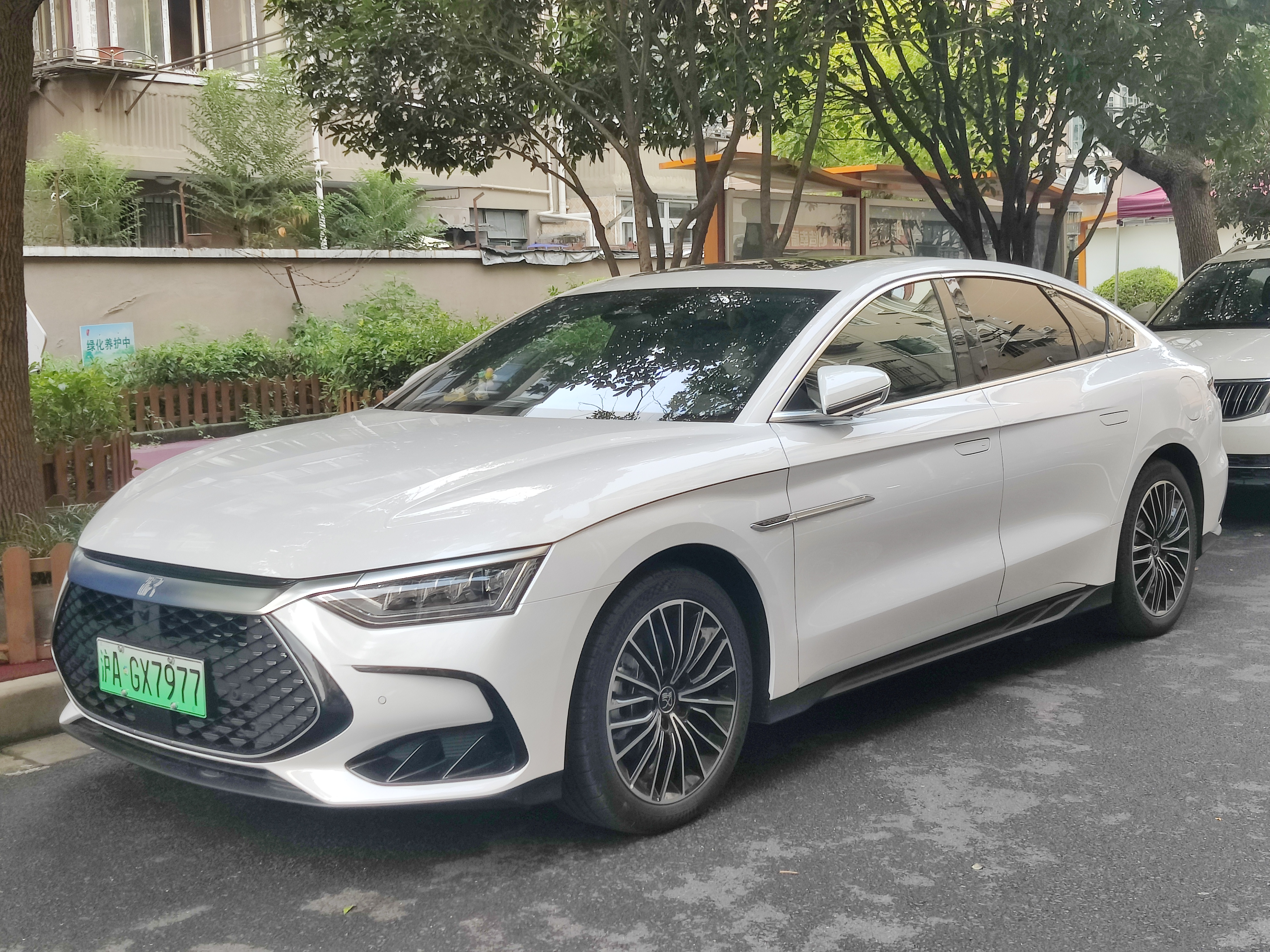
Han DM-i

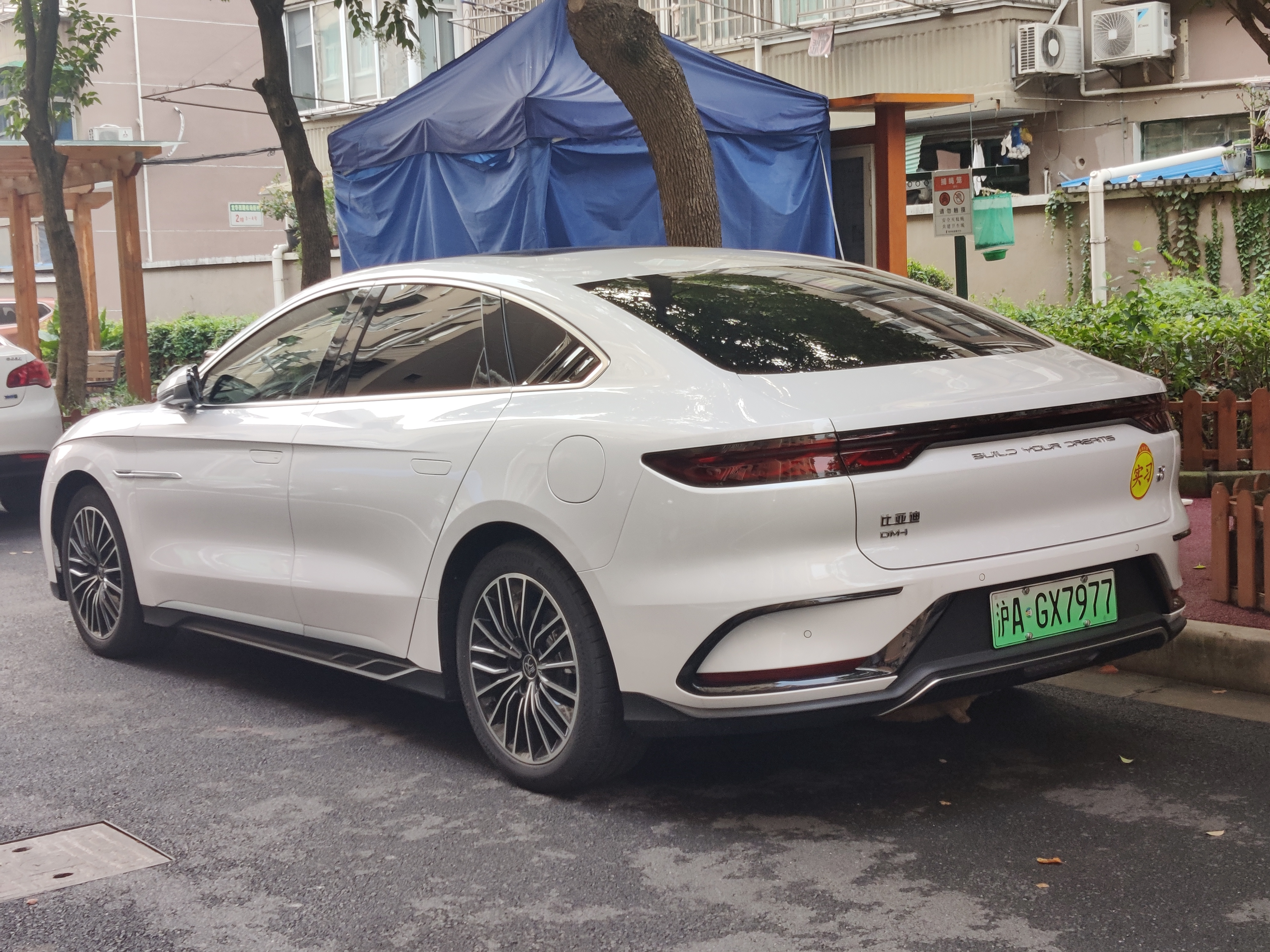
Rear view

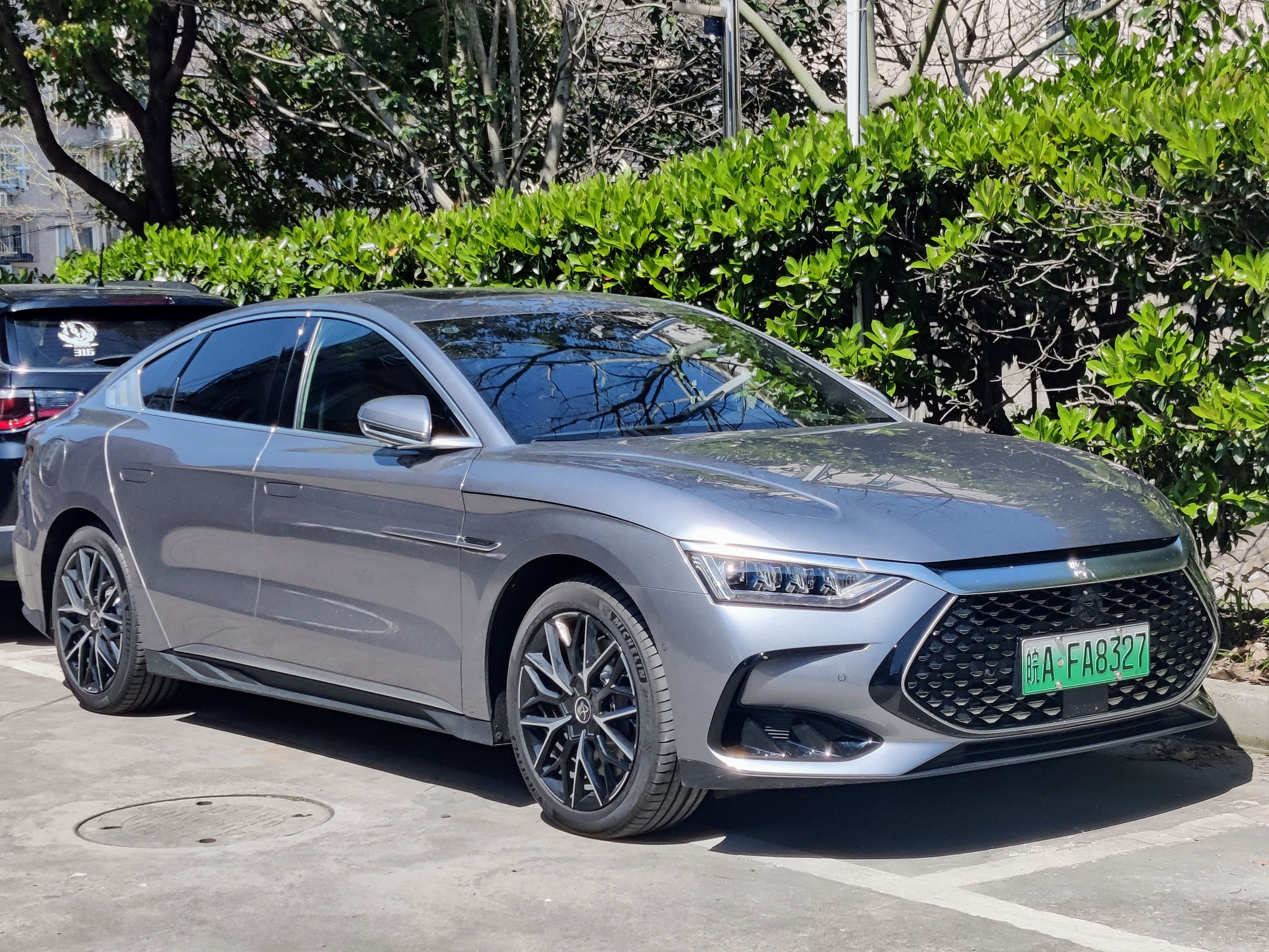
Han DM-p

===== Powertrain =====
Type	Engine			Trans.	Battery	Layout	Electric motor			0–100 km/h (0–62 mph) (claimed)	Electric range (claimed)		Calendar years
Type	Type	Power	Torque	Trans.	Battery	Layout	Type	Power	Torque	0–100 km/h (0–62 mph) (claimed)	NEDC	WLTC	Calendar years
DM-i 965	BYD476ZQC 1,497 cc (1.5 L) I4 turbo	102 kW (137 hp)	231 N⋅m (23.6 kg⋅m; 170 lb⋅ft)	E-CVT	18.32 kWh LFP	FWD	Front PMSM	145 kW (194 hp)	316 N⋅m (32.2 kg⋅m; 233 lb⋅ft)	7.9 seconds	121 km (75 mi)	101 km (63 mi)	2022–present
DM-i 1040	BYD476ZQC 1,497 cc (1.5 L) I4 turbo	102 kW (137 hp)	231 N⋅m (23.6 kg⋅m; 170 lb⋅ft)	E-CVT	30.77 kWh LFP	FWD	Front PMSM	160 kW (215 hp)	325 N⋅m (33.1 kg⋅m; 240 lb⋅ft)	7.9 seconds	200 km (124 mi)	170 km (106 mi)	2022–present
DM-p 970 4WD	BYD476ZQC 1,497 cc (1.5 L) I4 turbo	102 kW (137 hp)	231 N⋅m (23.6 kg⋅m; 170 lb⋅ft)	E-CVT	36.01 kWh LFP	AWD	Front PMSM	160 kW (215 hp)	325 N⋅m (33.1 kg⋅m; 240 lb⋅ft)	3.7 seconds	200 km (124 mi)	170 km (106 mi)	2022–present
DM-p 970 4WD	BYD476ZQC 1,497 cc (1.5 L) I4 turbo	102 kW (137 hp)	231 N⋅m (23.6 kg⋅m; 170 lb⋅ft)	E-CVT	36.01 kWh LFP	AWD	Rear PMSM	200 kW (268 hp)	350 N⋅m (35.7 kg⋅m; 258 lb⋅ft)	3.7 seconds	200 km (124 mi)	170 km (106 mi)	2022–present

==== Han EV ====
The updated Han EV features restyled front lower bumper and the updated rear end also shared with the updated DM-i and DM-p variants and was launched with the Han EV Founding Edition, including one variant with a range of 610 kilometres (379 mi) and two variants with a range of 715 kilometres (444 mi).

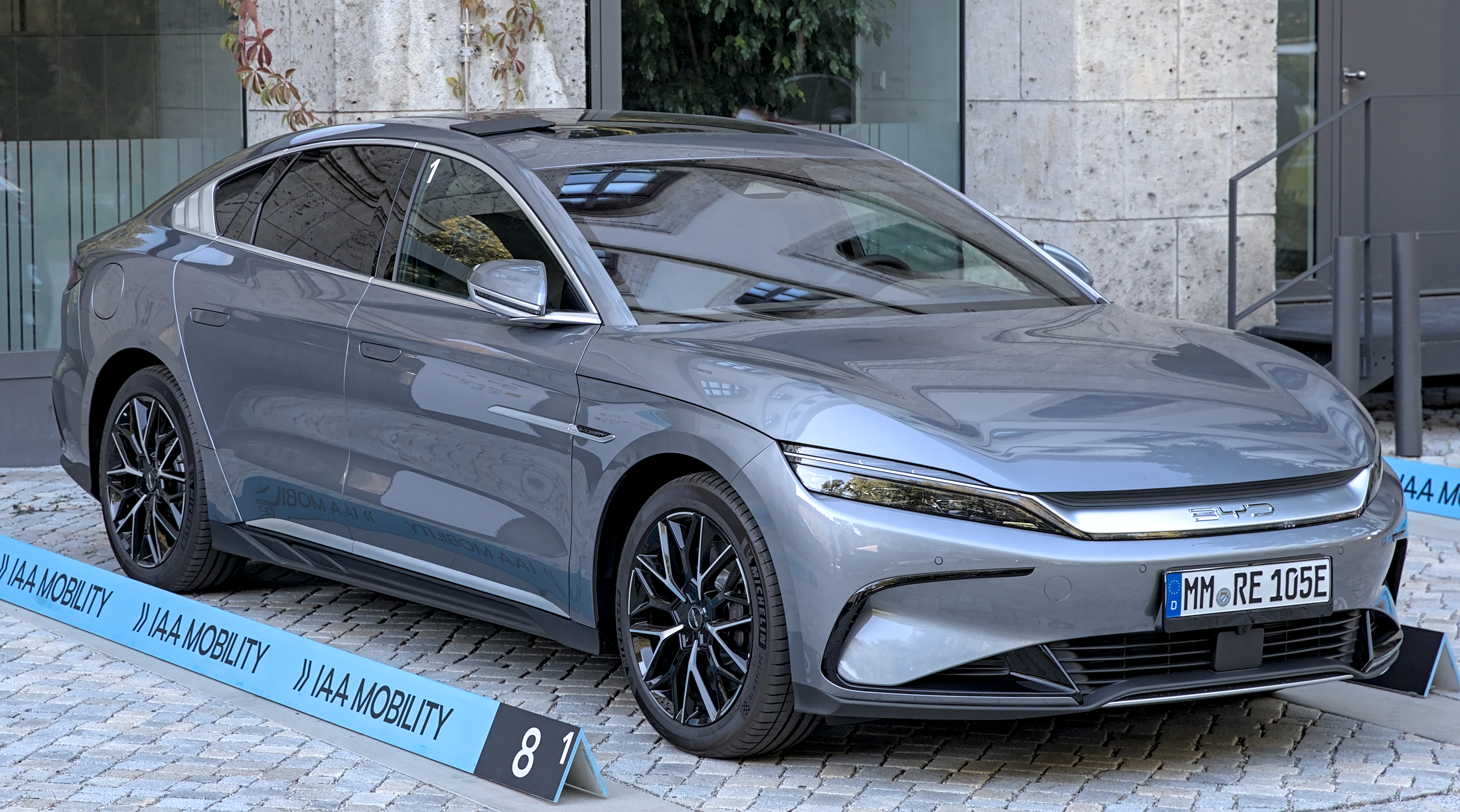
BYD Han EV (2022 facelift)

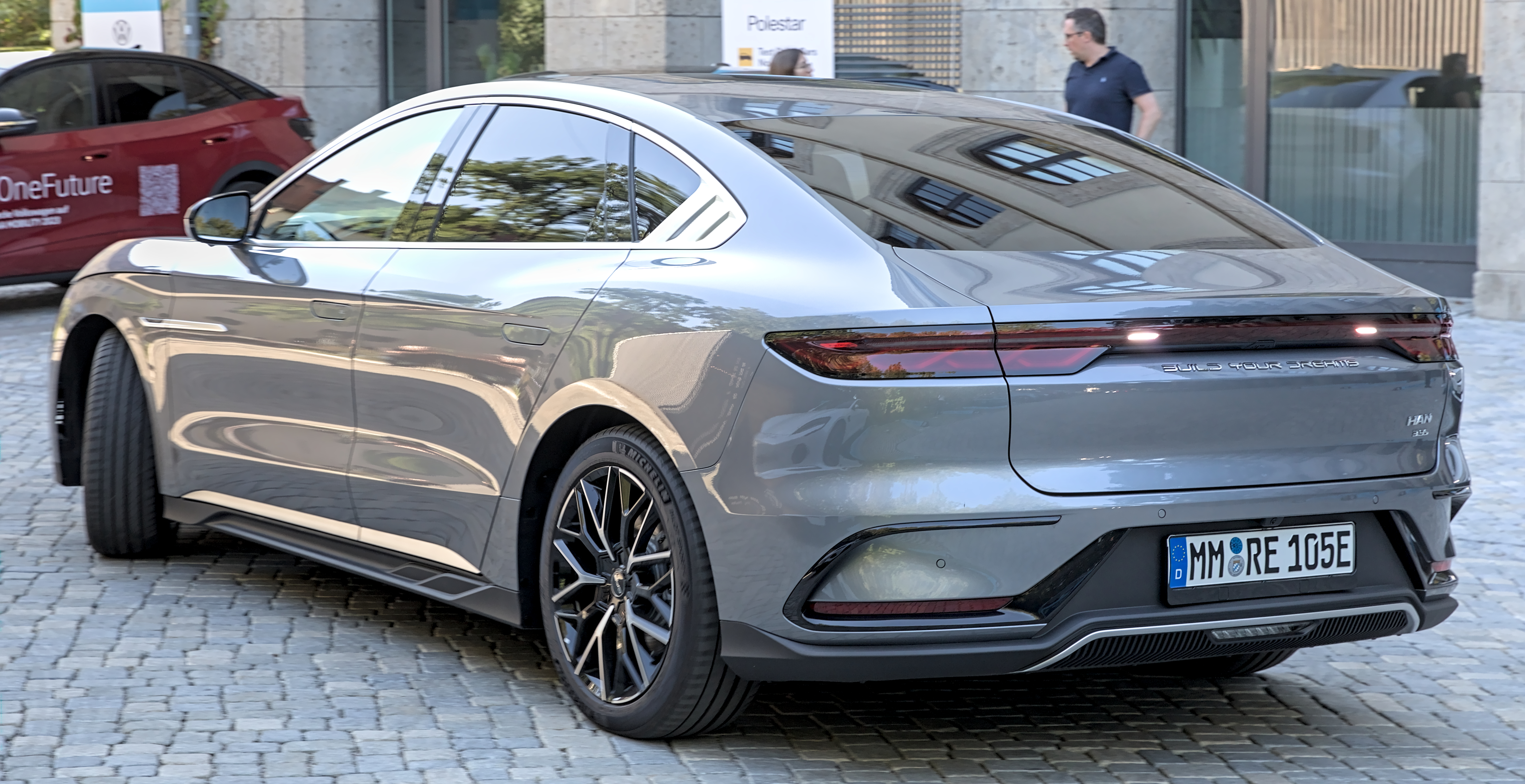
Rear view

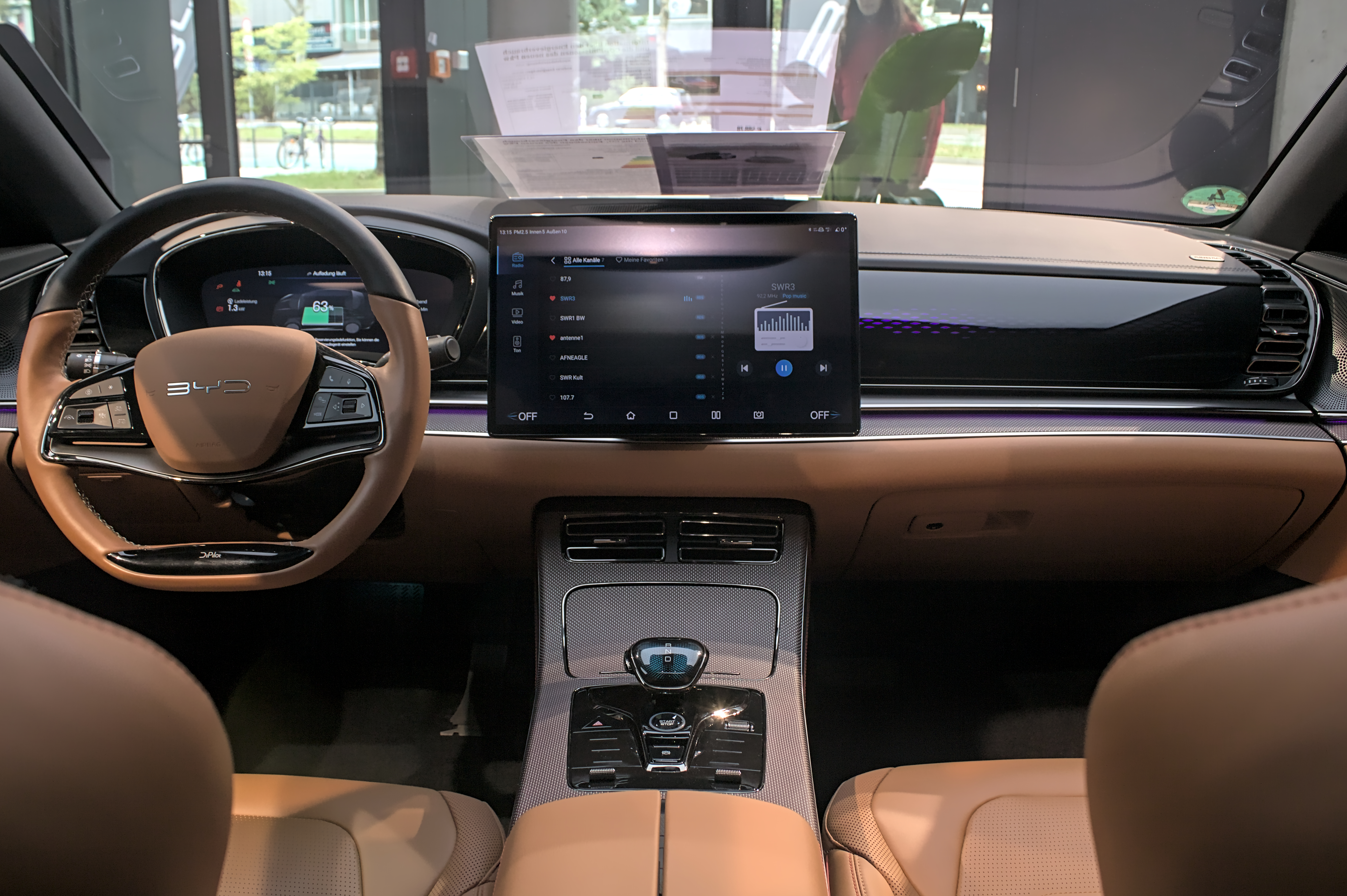
Interior

===== Powertrain =====
Type	Battery	Layout	Electric motor		Power	Torque	0–100 km/h (0–62 mph) (claimed)	Range (claimed)	Calendar years
Type	Battery	Layout	Electric motor		Power	Torque	0–100 km/h (0–62 mph) (claimed)	CLTC	Calendar years
506 km	60.48 kWh LFP Blade battery	FWD	Front	PMSM	150 kW (201 hp)	310 N⋅m (31.6 kg⋅m; 229 lb⋅ft)	7.9 seconds	506 km (314 mi)	2023–present
605 km	72 kWh LFP Blade battery	FWD	Front	PMSM	168 kW (225 hp)	350 N⋅m (35.7 kg⋅m; 258 lb⋅ft)	7.9 seconds	605 km (376 mi)	2023–present
715 km	85.44 kWh LFP Blade battery	FWD	Front	PMSM	180 kW (241 hp)	350 N⋅m (35.7 kg⋅m; 258 lb⋅ft)	7.9 seconds	715 km (444 mi)	2022–present
610 km AWD	85.44 kWh LFP Blade battery	AWD	Front	PMSM	180 kW (241 hp)	350 N⋅m (35.7 kg⋅m; 258 lb⋅ft)	3.9 seconds	610 km (379 mi)	2022–present
610 km AWD	85.44 kWh LFP Blade battery	AWD	Rear	PMSM	200 kW (268 hp)	350 N⋅m (35.7 kg⋅m; 258 lb⋅ft)	3.9 seconds	610 km (379 mi)	2022–present
610 km AWD	85.44 kWh LFP Blade battery	AWD	Combined:		380 kW (510 hp)	700 N⋅m (71.4 kg⋅m; 516 lb⋅ft)	3.9 seconds	610 km (379 mi)	2022–present

=== 2024 refresh ===
BYD introduced the 2025 model year Han in September 2024, while reducing its prices. While previously the Han plug-in hybrid and EV version has different front clip design, since the 2025 model year all Han models shares the same front fascia adopted from the Han EV. Unlike most new BYD models, the 2025 model Han retains "Build Your Dreams" at the back while other models received the new BYD logo along with red backlights. The plug-in hybrid system of the Han DM-i was upgraded to the latest DM-i 5.0 platform.

The 2025 Han is also equipped with BYD's DiPilot 300 advanced driver assistance system with LiDAR and Nvidia Orin-X system-on-a-chip, that offers highway and urban pilot assistance. It also includes the DiSus-C intelligent damping system, which adjusts suspension for comfort or stability.

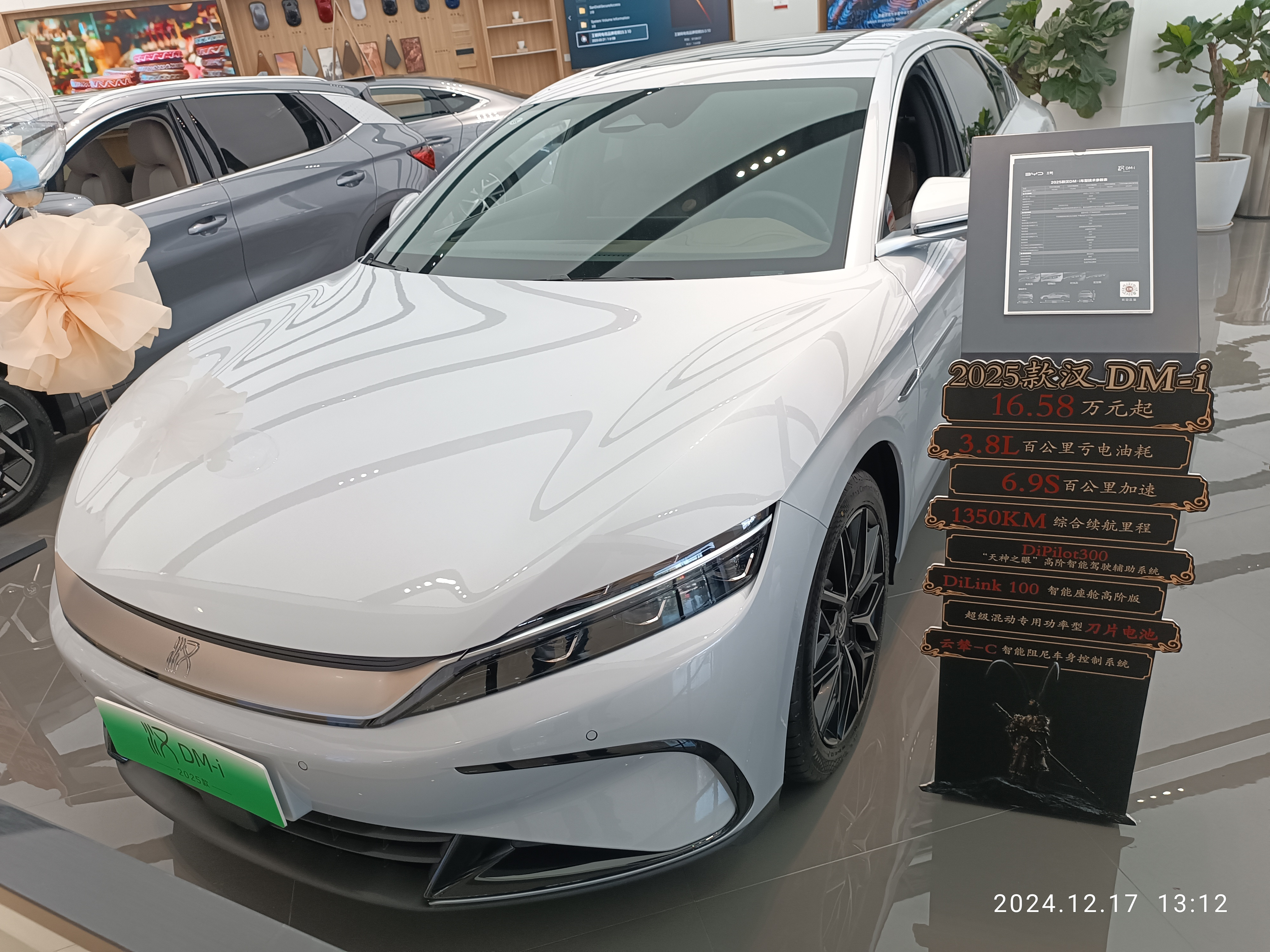
BYD Han DM-i (2024 facelift)

=== Awards ===
The Han EV won the 2021 iF Design Award, the first ever sedan model from a Chinese car brand.

=== BYD e9 (2021) / Linghui e9 (2026) ===
The BYD e9 was officially launched in March 2021, complimenting other e-series products such as the e2, e3, e5 and e6. It being pitched against medium and large pure electric sedans for the high-end online ride-hailing market. The e9 is largely based on the Han EV and features the Han DM front end styling, with different grille insert and logos. It also uses conventional door handles.

The e9 is available with a single-motor two-front wheel drive model with a maximum power of 163 kW (219 hp; 222 PS), a maximum torque of 330 N⋅m (33.7 kg⋅m; 243 lb⋅ft), an NEDC cruising range of 506 km (314 mi), and an acceleration from 0–100 km/h (0–62 mph) in 7.9 seconds. It takes 30 minutes to charge the power from 30% to 80% with fast charge mode.

On January 9, 2026, BYD released a new ride-hailing sub-brand, Linghui. Photos of a new Linghui e9 revealed by the MIIT, it is essentially a rebadged BYD e9 with new grille on a front bumper, different rear trunk lid taillights shape from the original Han and a new Linghui logo.

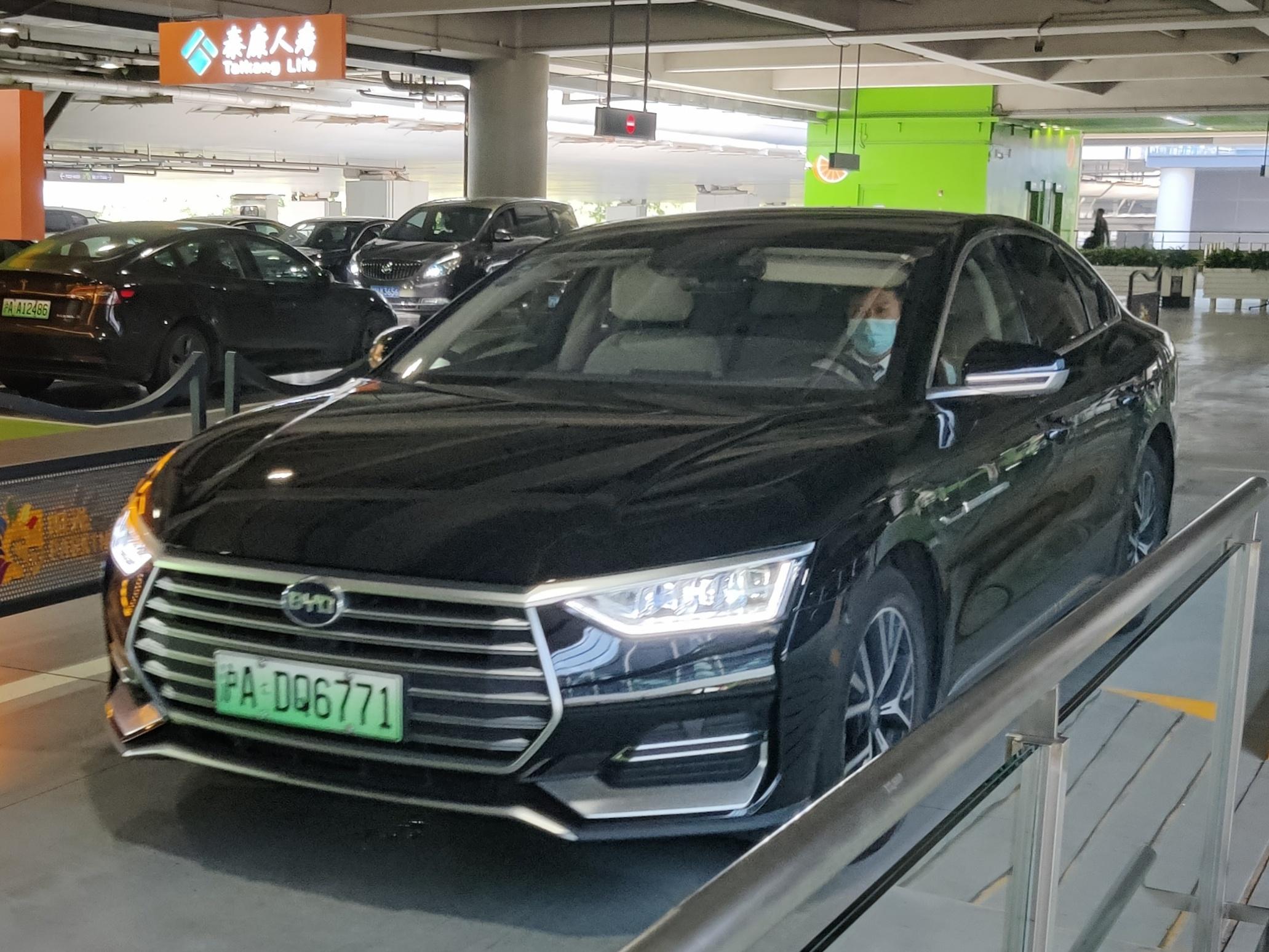
BYD e9 (pre-facelift)

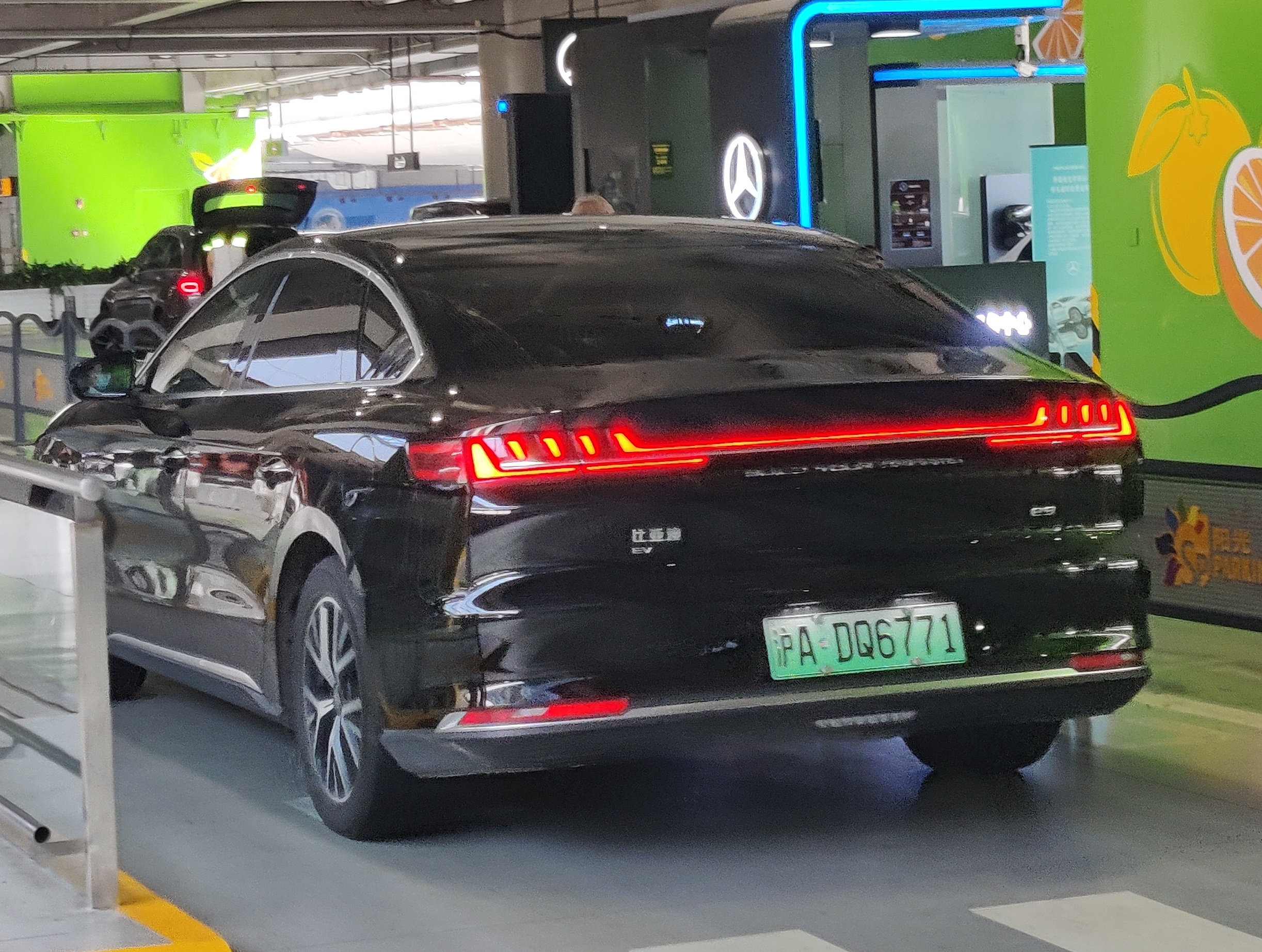
Rear view (pre-facelift)

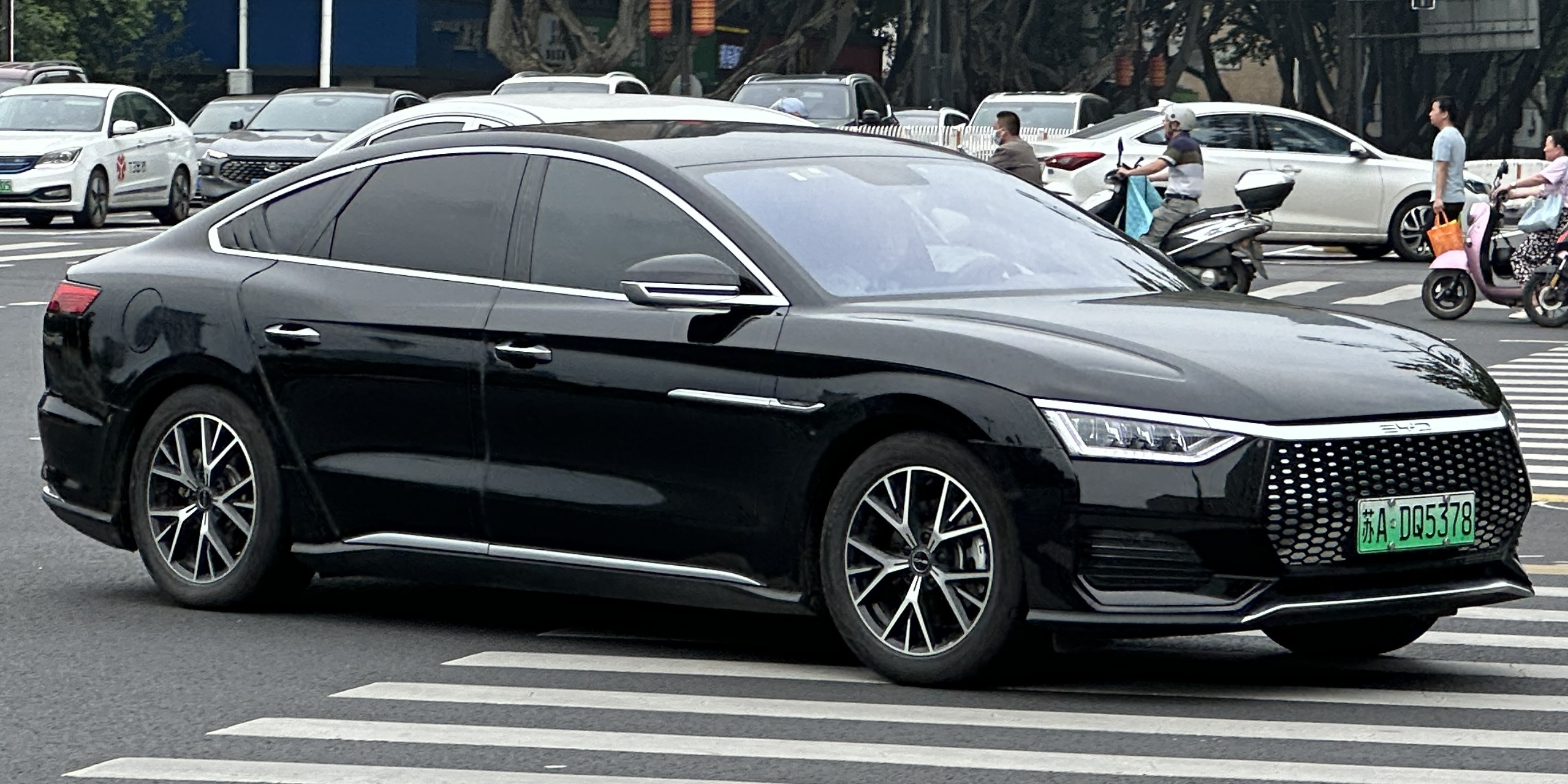
BYD e9 (facelift)

== Second generation (2026) ==
Second generation

Overview
- Production: 2026 (to commence)
- Designer: Under the lead of Wolfgang Egger

Body and chassis
- Body style: 4-door sedan
- Layout: EV: Rear-motor, rear-wheel-drive; Dual-motor, all-wheel-drive; PHEV: Front-engine, rear-motor, rear-wheel-drive
- Platform: e-Platform 3.0 (Electric)
- Related: BYD Dahan

Powertrain
- Engine: Petrol plug-in hybrid: 1.5 L BYD472ZQB turbo I4

Dimensions
- Wheelbase: 3,030 mm (119.3 in)
- Length: 5,156 mm (203.0 in)
- Width: 1,969 mm (77.5 in)
- Height: 1,507 mm (59.3 in)

The second generation Han was revealed through China's MIIT filings on 16 October 2026. Dimensionally, it is considerably larger than its predecessor, slotting between the smaller Han L and the larger, flagship Dahan. This relationship is similar to that of the Tang L, third-generation Tang and flagship Datang.

=== Design ===
The second generation Han continues to use an evolution of the Loong (dragon) face design language, with a similar face, side profile and taillights as the Han L and Dahan. Wheel sizes range from 18 to 20 inches.

=== Powertrain ===
The second generation Han is available with multiple battery electric (EV) and plug-in hybrid (DM-i) powertrains, all of which use BYD's LFP second generation blade battery.

Model	Drive	Motor	Power	Engine		Top speed	Kerb weight
Model	Drive	Motor	Power	Type	Power	Top speed	Kerb weight
BYD7150CE6HEV1	RWD	Single (rear)	200 kW (270 hp)	1.5-liter turbocharged	110 kW (150 hp)	200 km/h (124 mph)	2,115 kg (4,663 lb)
BYD7000CEBEV2	RWD	Single (rear)	245 kW (329 hp)	N/A		240 km/h (149 mph)	2,005 kg (4,420 lb)
BYD7000CEBEV3	RWD	Single (rear)	300 kW (400 hp)	N/A		240 km/h (149 mph)	2,125 kg (4,685 lb)
BYD7000CEBEV1	AWD	Dual	200 kW (270 hp) + 320 kW (430 hp)	N/A		270 km/h (168 mph)	2,351 kg (5,183 lb)

== Han L (2025) ==
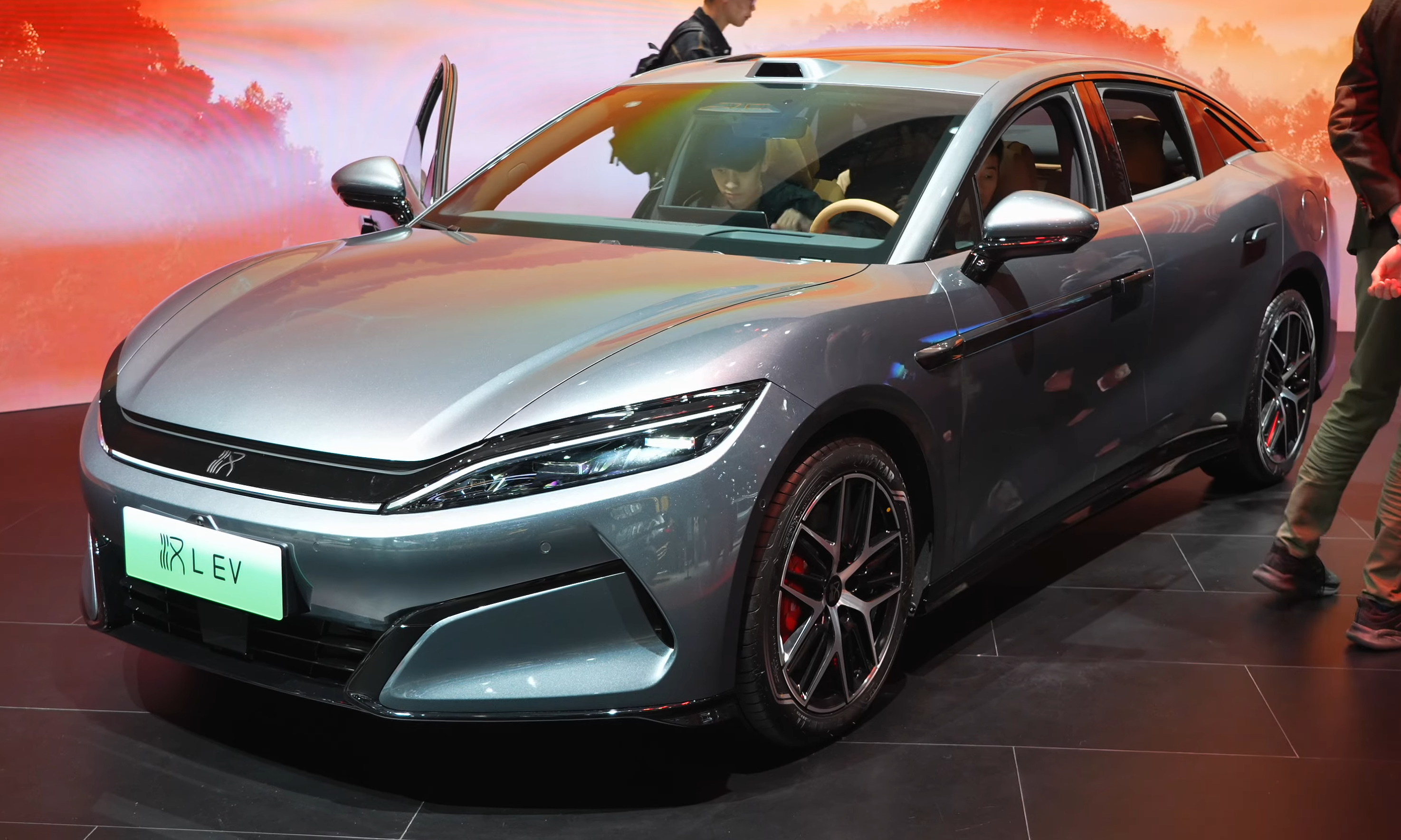
2025 BYD Han L EV

The Han L is a plug-in hybrid and battery-electric sedan belonging to the E-segment (mid-size) and was sold since 2025, based on the DM-i 5.0 platform and Super e platform.

== Dahan (2026) ==
2026 BYD Dahan

The BYD Dahan, alternatively known in English as the BYD Great Han (Chinese: 大汉) is a full-size sedan belong to the F-segment (full-size) (Chinese "D-segment", Chinese: D级). It is BYD's flagship sedan, outsizing the Han and Han L.

== Sales ==
Year	China		
Year	Han DM	Han EV	Total
2020	11,783	28,773	40,556
2021	30,476	87,189	117,665
2022	128,524	143,938	272,462
2023	121,859	105,887	227,746
2024	141,284	87,429	228,713
2025	71,673	48,148	119,821

== See also ==
- List of BYD Auto vehicles
