= Bite (show) =

Show logo

Bite was a production show which opened at the Stratosphere Las Vegas Hotel & Casino in August 2004 and closed October 2013. Tim Molyneux was the creator, writer, director and producer of Bite. The choreographers were Mic Thompson, Gary Thomas, Dar Brzezinski and Sarah Fazio.

The show featured vampire mythology with classic rock music, human flying, magic, dancing, live singing, martial arts, and contortion. Bite was an 18 years or older show and featured topless dancers. Bite was produced by Molyneux Entertainment and played six nights a week in the Theatre of the Stars at the Stratosphere Las Vegas.

The Bite Las Vegas production increased its fan base and continued to keep the popularity of vampires growing along with the Twilight book series and blockbuster movie and the HBO original series, True Blood.

The show's final performance was on Halloween night, October 31, 2013, at 10:30 pm.

== Story ==
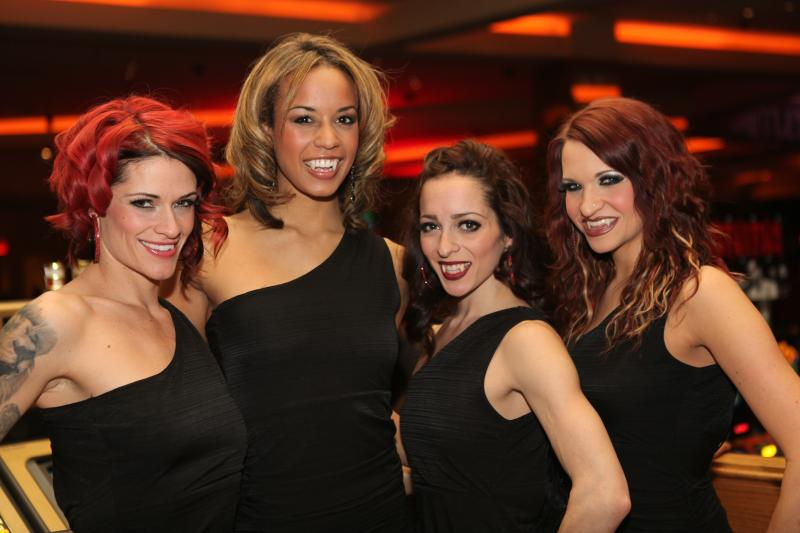
Performers from Bite

There is no dialogue in Bite. The story is told through action, dance and the use of some classic rock 'n' roll songs—more than 40 in all. Bite takes its audience on the Lord Vampire's quest for his long lost love; whom he has to convince and seduce into becoming his eternal Queen of the Night. Aiding the Lord Vampire is his coven of sultry and nimble dancers, the Erotic Rock Angels.
