= Byte (retailer) =

Defunct British computer store chain

Byte Computer Superstores Ltd
- Trade name: Byte
- Company type: Privately held company
- Industry: Retail
- Founded: 1993
- Founder: Peter Rigby
- Defunct: 1998
- Fate: Acquired
- Successor: PC World (retailer)
- Headquarters: Birmingham, United Kingdom
- Number of locations: 16 superstores, plus 46 concessions within Office World stores
- Area served: United Kingdom
- Products: Computers, software, and computer accessories
- Owner: Specialist Computer Holdings Ltd (SCH)
- Number of employees: 500 (1998)
- Website: www.byte.co.uk

Byte Computer Superstores (Byte) was a British retail chain of computer stores across the United Kingdom which from 1993 sold primarily computer hardware, software and accessories in large stores on retail parks, (similar to PC World). The company was acquired by PC World in 1998 who re-branded or closed each store - leaving the Byte name to no longer exist.

== History ==
The company was founded in 1993 after Sir Peter Rigby, having taken a trip to the United States, decided there was an opportunity in the UK market for a high quality computer retail chain that offered good products, advice, customer service and repairs.

In 1993 Byte Computer Superstores was launched.

These stores where large, stocked with the latest in computer hardware, software and accessories and offered a level of customer service and knowledge in personal computers that was not available at that time in the UK. In 1993, Peters son Steve Rigby helped found the Byte Computer Superstore chain and was promoted to Managing Director in 1996, a position he held until the company's sale to PC World in 1998.

The company grew and by Christmas 1996 was Britain's largest computer retailer with over 61 locations including 13 superstores. The company was acquired by PC World in 1998 who re-branded each store leaving the Byte name to no longer exist.

In April 2012, a UK based Entrepreneur successfully applied for and was granted the Byte trademark. In January 2013 Byte Technology Ltd was incorporated with the intention of relaunching the Byte brand which by now had not been seen in the UK for over 15 years. Byte was officially relaunched as an on-line retailer (www.byte.co.uk) in January 2015 with a range of Apple Certified accessories, and consumer electronics, but was subsequently closed.
