= Bright Ideas Trust =

British social enterprise charity

Bright Ideas Trust (BIT) was a registered charity founded in 2007 by Richard Morris as a social enterprise for Tim Campbell to help those not in education, employment or training (NEETs) aged 16 to 30 build their own businesses. It went on to be awarded $1,000,000 by the Bank of America - one of the largest single donations to be given to a UK charity. BIT was launched by David Cameron when he was Leader of the Opposition and later by Boris Johnson when he was Mayor of London.

== Target group ==
The charity was established to encourage young people from disadvantaged backgrounds to get involved in enterprise.

Bright Ideas Trust provided (it has since closed) end-to-end business start-up support, mentoring and access to funding to disadvantaged 16- to 30-year-olds, including those who are not in employment, education or training (NEET).

== Charitable activities ==
Despite being a charity, Bright Ideas Trust does not give away grants but instead helps beneficiaries access start-up finance via start-up loans.

The charity provides bespoke support for young people who want to start their own business. Each young person is matched with a mentor, who works with them during the business planning stage and for at least the first twelve months of the business trading. Mentors are usually experienced entrepreneurs from a wide variety of sectors.

Every 2 months Bright Ideas Trust hosts an informal networking event for young people and people interested in helping them set up in business. Each event includes an interview with a young person the charity has helped, a guest speaker who is usually an established business owner and an expert business panel q&a session.

Bright Ideas Trust also delivers enterprise awareness workshops and events in schools, colleges, universities and other youth organisations to help young people make fully informed decisions regarding their career choice.

Bright Ideas Trust also engages with prisons, youth offending teams, housing associations and other organisations supporting employability projects for young people.
