= Byton (company) =

Chinese car manufacturer

- Type: Public
- Industry: Automotive, Electric Vehicles
- Founded: 2016; 10 years ago
- Founder: Carsten Breitfeld; Daniel Kirchert
- Defunct: 2021; 5 years ago
- Fate: Defunct (Bankruptcy)
- Headquarters: Nanjing, China
- Key people: Ding Qingfen (Acting CEO)
- Products: Electric Vehicles
- Number of employees: more than 10 worldwide (July 2020)
- Parent: China Harmony New Energy Auto Holding Ltd
- Website: byton.com

Byton was a Chinese-German all-electric vehicle automotive brand established in 2017 and incorporated in Hong Kong, co-founded by former BMW and Nissan executives. Byton unveiled its first concept car to the public in January 2018. It planned to introduce its M-Byte SUV model first, with the start of production and sales scheduled for late 2019, however developmental delays and financial troubles repeatedly pushed back the launch.

In June 2020, the company decided to suspend operations for corporate reorganization for a planned six-month period. In 2021, Byton entered bankruptcy, and its work with manufacturing partner Foxconn was halted indefinitely.

== History ==
In 2016, Tencent, together with Foxconn and luxury-car dealer Harmony New Energy Auto started a new joint venture called Future Mobility, a car startup that aimed to sell all-electric fully autonomous premium cars in 2020.

The company was co-founded by Carsten Breitfeld, CEO, and Daniel Kirchert, president. It was a subsidiary of China Harmony New Energy Auto Holding Limited.

In January 2017, the company announced its first manufacturing facility would be located in Nanjing, China at a cost of US$1.7 billion and an initial production capacity of 150,000 cars. Around 2017, Future Mobility was renamed to Byton. In 2018, Chinese state owned First Auto Works invested a "significant amount of money" into Byton.

CEO and co-founder Carsten Breitfeld left Byton in April 2019. Fellow co-founder Daniel Kirchert subsequently assumed the position of CEO. Breitfeld later revealed that he had left Byton over the active interference with the company by the Chinese government through FAW.

In April 2020, the company furloughed about half of the 450 employees who worked at its North American headquarters. In June 2020, the company decided to suspend operations for corporate reorganization for a planned six-month period.

On September 9, 2020, Nanjing Shengteng Automobile Technology Co, Ltd. was established as the new owner of the brand. FAW Equity Investment (Tianjin) Co., Ltd. holds 23.333% of the shares in Byton, and Duan Lianxiang holds another 6.6667%. In October 2020, it was announced that CEO and co-founder Daniel Kirchert had left the company due to its continued financial troubles.

In January 2021, it was announced that Taiwanese manufacturer Foxconn would enter into a strategic partnership with Byton. Foxconn planned on investing US$200 million into Byton. Foxconn was expected to assist Byton with manufacturing and supply chain management.

In April 2021, Byton's German subsidiary entered bankruptcy. In July 2021, Byton suspended operations in China. In September 2021, Nikkei reported that Byton's manufacturing partner Foxconn was putting the project on hold due to continuing financial issues at Byton, effectively putting operations on hold indefinitely.

== Products ==
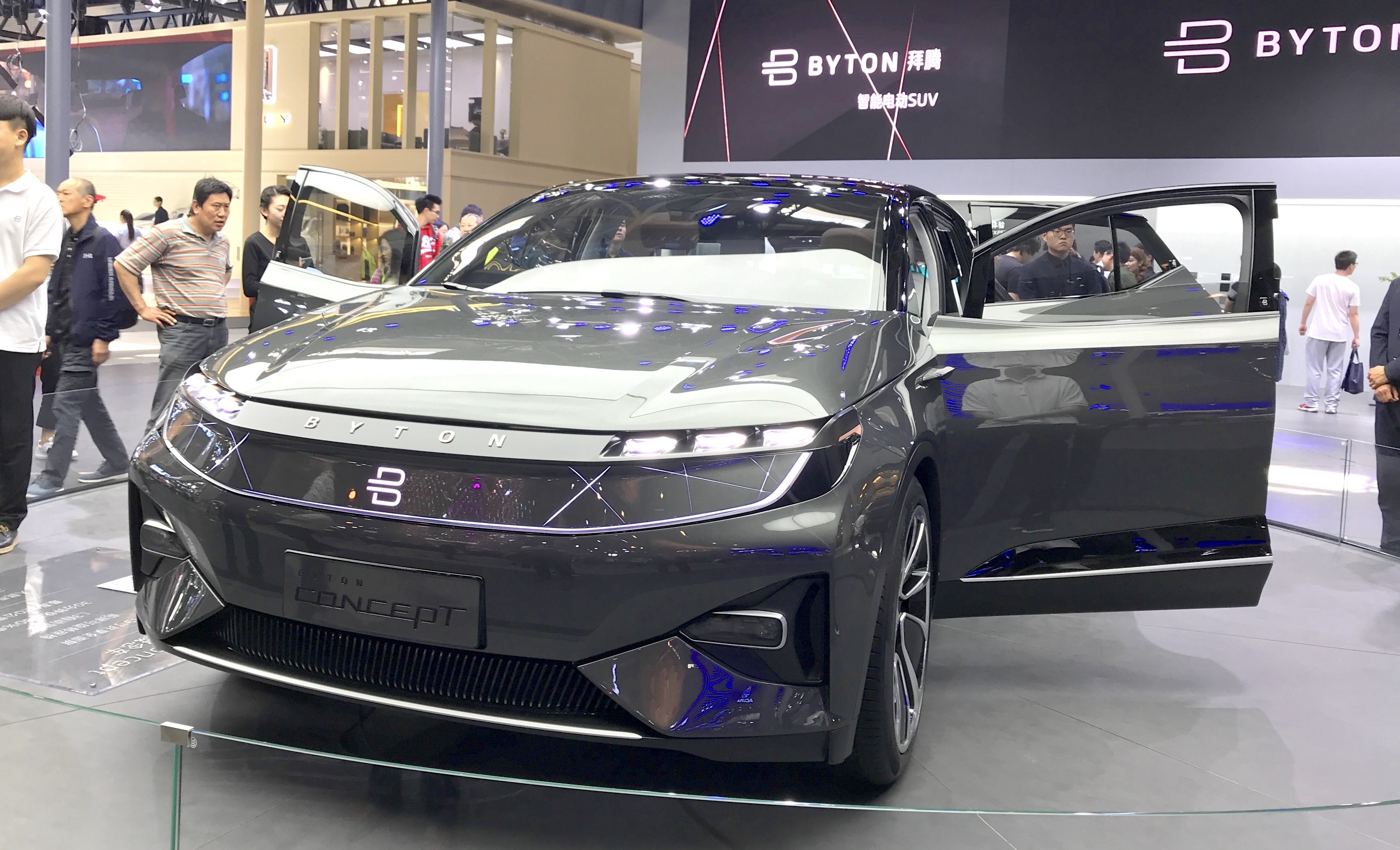
Byton M-Byte (formerly Concept)

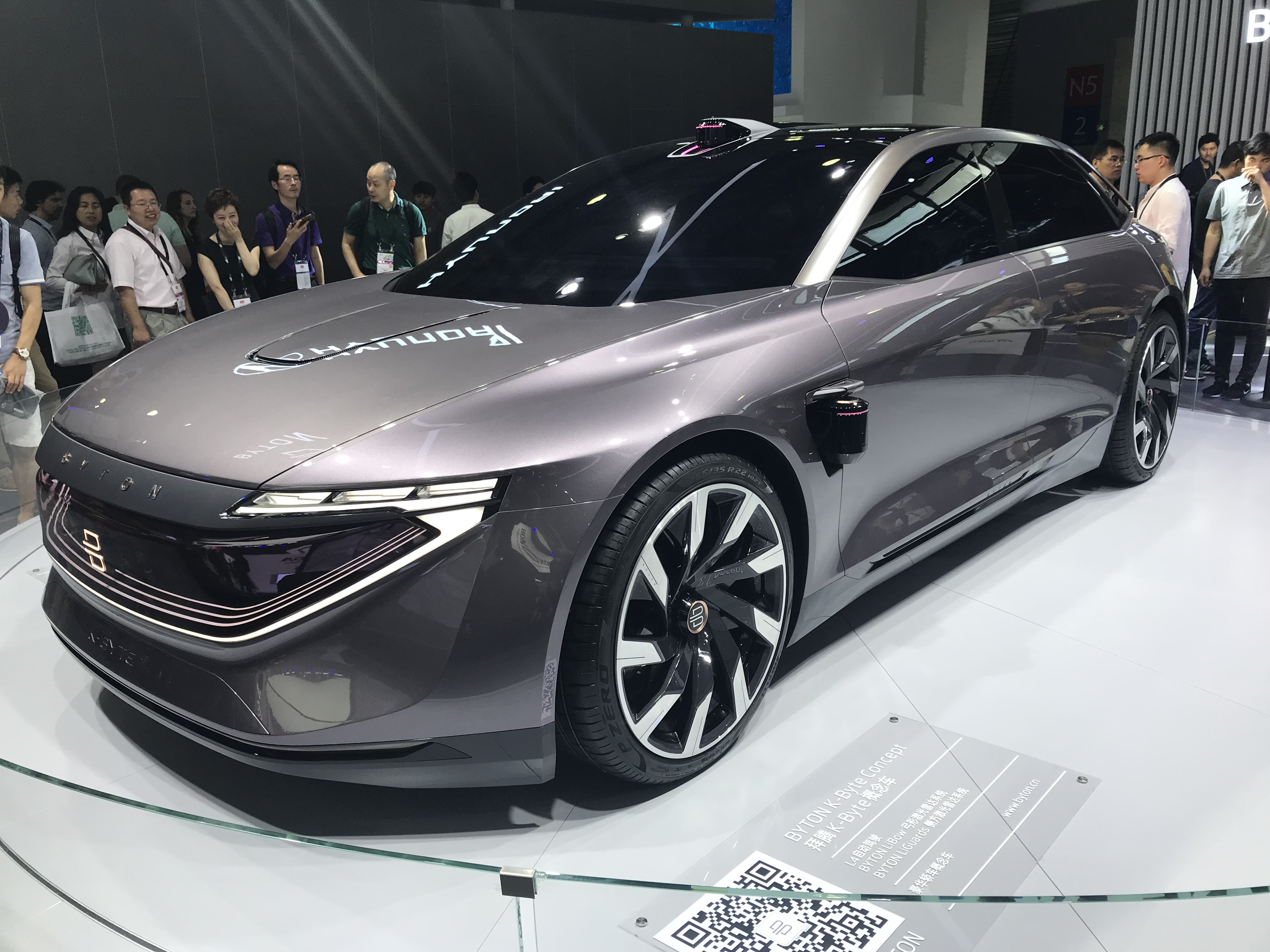
Byton K-Byte Concept

The company announced its ambition to launch three electric car models by 2022.

=== Byton M-Byte ===
The Byton M-Byte is an all-electric battery-powered SUV concept car. It was first announced is the mid-sized Byton crossover, but only in concept form, with sales expected to commence in the fourth quarter of 2019 in China, Europe and the US. It was unveiled at the Consumer Electronic Show (CES) in Las Vegas on 7 January 2018.

=== Byton K-Byte ===
The Byton K-Byte is an all-electric battery-powered sedan concept car. In June 2018, Byton unveiled the Byton K-Byte Concept sedan at CES Asia previewing a luxury electric sedan.

== See also ==
- Li Auto
- Nio Inc.
- Polestar
- Tesla, Inc.
- XPeng
- Aptera Motors
