= Bit (disambiguation) =

A bit is a symbol used for communication or, equivalently, a unit of information storage on a computer. A bit is also used as a unit of information.

Bit or BIT may also refer to:

== Tools and engineering ==
- Drill bit, for drilling holes
- Screwdriver bit
- Tool bit, for lathe turning
- Bit key, a key with a distinct part that engages the locking mechanism. The shape described by the bitting.
- Bit (horse), part of horse tack placed in the mouth
- The cutting edge of an axe
- The heated part of a soldering iron

== Arts and entertainment ==
- Unit of action or bit, in acting
- Bit part, a minor role
- Bit (comedy), material from a standup comedian's repertoire
- Bit, in the list of Tron characters
- Bit (film), a 2019 vampire film

== Organisations ==
- Behavioural Insights Team, a social engineering organization
- Bit Corporation, a video game company
- Bipolar Integrated Technology, a former American semiconductor company
- BIT Teatergarasjen, Norwegian theatre and dance company
- Bright Ideas Trust, British social enterprise

=== Education ===
- Bearys Institute of Technology, a private technical co-educational college, Mangalore, India
- Bangalore Institute of Technology, an institution of higher learning in India
- Beijing Institute of Technology, a university in China
- Birla Institute of Technology, Mesra, an engineering institute in Ranchi, India
- Birla Institute of Technology, Patna, an engineering institute in Patna, India
- BIT International College, formerly the Bohol Institute of Technology or BIT, in Bohol, Philippines
- BIT Sathy or Bannari Amman Institute of Technology, India
- Bhilai Institute of Technology – Durg, in Central India
- Bangladesh International Tutorial- A school in Dhaka

== Science and technology ==
- Built-in test, in electronics
- BIT (alternative information centre), a communal information service which derived its name from the smallest unit of computer information
- Benzisothiazolinone, a biocide
- BIT Numerical Mathematics a journal of mathematics
- Binary indexed tree, a data structure
- .bit, the former file extension for .mp3 before 1995

== Other uses ==
- BiT City agglomeration in Poland, Bydgoszcz–Toruń metropolitan area
- Bit people, an ethnic group in Laos
  - Bit language, spoken by the Bit people
- Bit (money)
- Bachelor of Information Technology, a degree
- Bilateral investment treaty
- Bit or Bitburger, the beer of the Bitburger brewery
- Bit, magazine for owners of home computers published by Ultrasoft
- Beijing Institute of Technology F.C., an association football club in China
- BIT, the National Rail station code for Bicester Village railway station, Oxford, England
- Bittern railway station, Melbourne

== See also ==
- BITS (disambiguation)
- Bitts, paired vertical posts used to secure a ship's mooring lines, ropes, hawsers, or cables
- Bitten (disambiguation)
