= Scream (Six Flags drop tower) =

Series of tower rides at Six Flags parks

Scream!
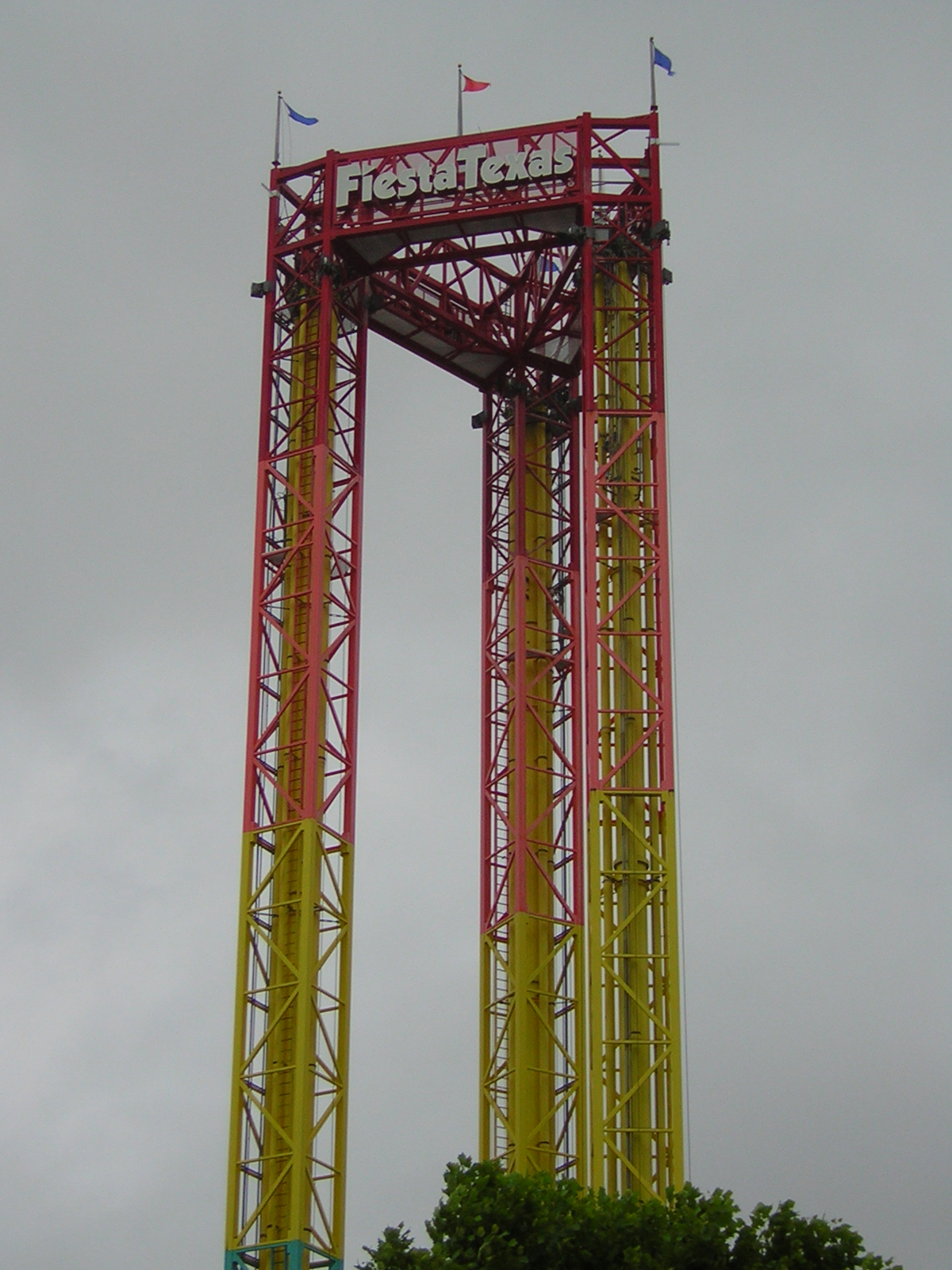
- Scream at Six Flags Fiesta Texas

Six Flags Fiesta Texas
- Area: Rockville
- Status: Operating
- Opening date: March 13, 1999 (third tower opened May 28, 1999)

Six Flags New England
- Area: Main Street
- Status: Operating
- Opening date: 1998 (2 towers added in 2000)

Ride statistics
- Attraction type: Space Shot; Turbo Drop
- Manufacturer: S&S Worldwide
- Model: Combo Tower
- Height restriction: 52 in (132 cm)
- Fast Lane available

Scream! is a drop tower ride at Six Flags Fiesta Texas in San Antonio, Texas and Six Flags New England in Agawam, Massachusetts. Designed by S&S Worldwide, the ride propels riders up in the air, drops them halfway, brings them back up and finally brings them down to ground level. Both rides are nearly 20 stories high. Three additional drop towers installed at other Six Flags parks are known as Superman: Tower of Power.

== Six Flags Fiesta Texas ==
Scream at Six Flags Fiesta Texas in San Antonio, Texas opened on March 13, 1999, in the Rockville section of the park. While it first opened with two towers, a third tower opened on May 28, 1999. The third tower was built along with the ride originally, however its only function was to act as a support beam. The ride was shut down roughly a month and a half later to construct the third tower due to the lines for only two towers averaging wait times of roughly 3 to 5 hours. It was the very first "combo tower" from S&S Power, combining the ride actions of both a Turbo Drop and Space Shot in one ride cycle. These towers also have the capability of running both actions separately via a control switch on the operator booth. The ride was fabricated by Intermountain Lift, Inc.

== Six Flags New England ==
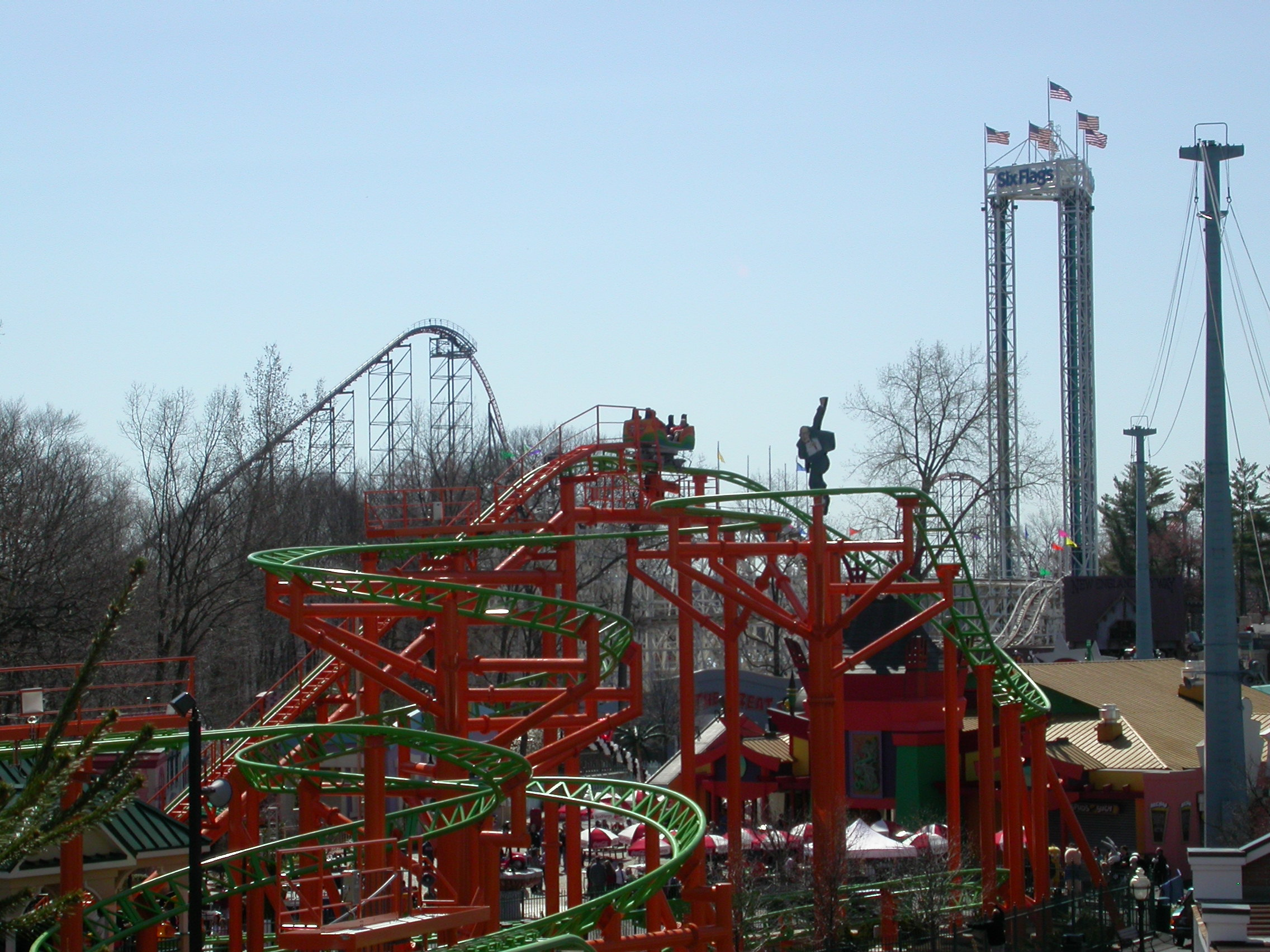
Scream with Pandemonium in the foreground at Six Flags New England

A second ride at Six Flags New England in Agawam, Massachusetts opened in 1998, in the Main Street section, named Hellevator and painted red. In 2000, the ride was expanded, featuring two more towers and repainting the ride white. The two new towers then featured Turbo Drop, Space Shot, and Combo modes, while the original tower can only operate the Turbo Drop mode.
