= SkyJump Las Vegas =

Amusement ride

SkyJump
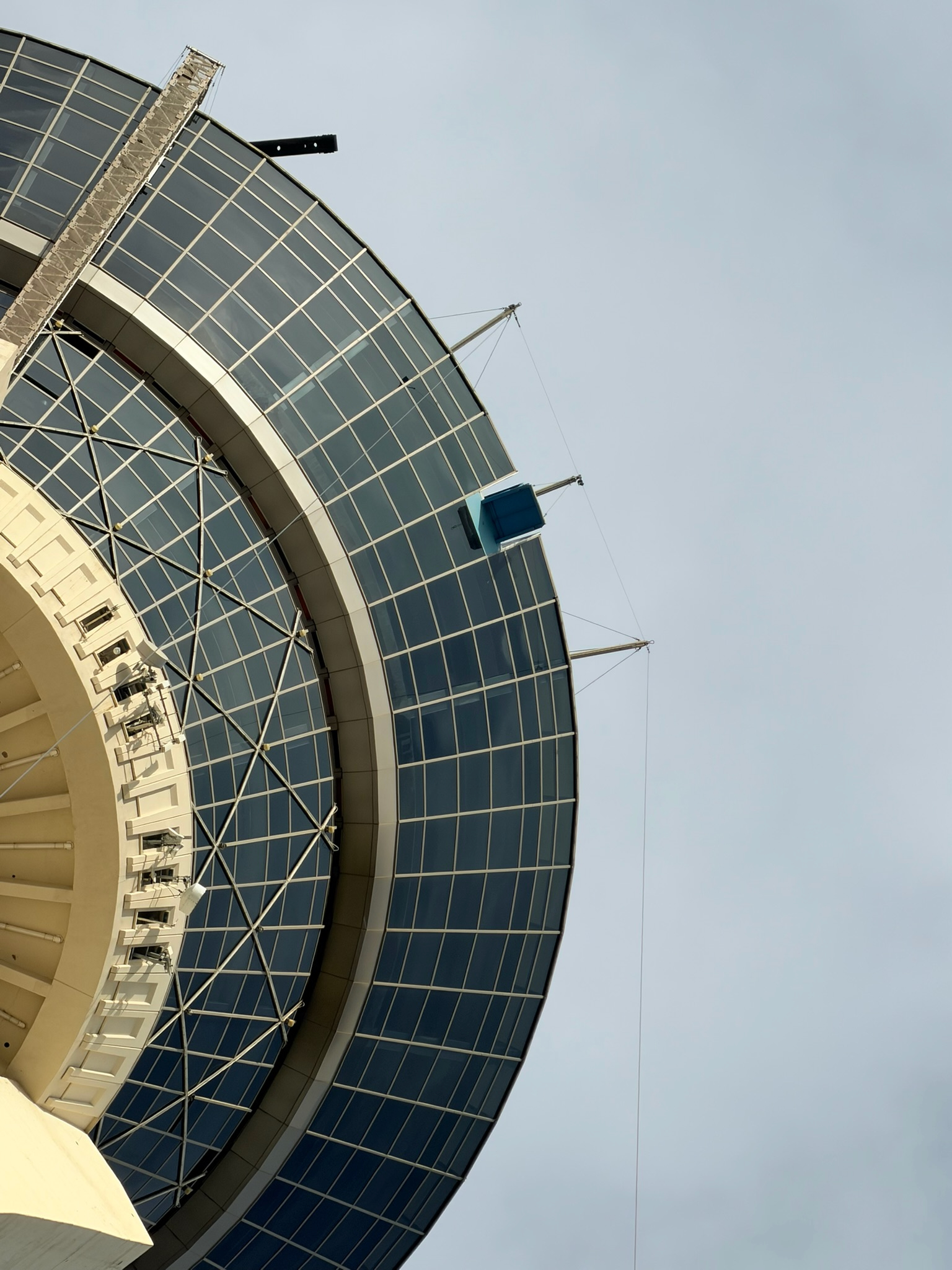
- SkyJump viewed from the ground (it is the blue square directly overhead)

The Strat
- Coordinates: 36°08′51″N 115°09′19″W
- Status: Operating
- Opening date: April 20, 2010

Ride statistics
- Attraction type: SkyJump
- Manufacturer: JumpTechnics Ltd
- Height: 855 ft (261 m)
- Speed: 40 mph (64 km/h)
- Height restriction: 52 in (132 cm)

SkyJump Las Vegas is a commercial decelerator located at The Strat on the Las Vegas Strip. It holds the Guinness World Record for highest commercial decelerator descent with an official height of 829 ft (253 m). As part of its grand opening event, Las Vegas Mayor Oscar Goodman presented a written proclamation deeming April 20, 2010 as SkyJump Day in Las Vegas.

== Ride experience ==
SkyJump Las Vegas is a controlled decelerator descent. Riders of SkyJump Las Vegas are given a short safety lesson and suited up in a The Strat custom “jump suit”. The rider is then connected to a patented highspeed “descender” machine and led to the edge of a small platform where they will leap out and descend the Strat SkyPod. The effect is similar to bungee jumping. Guide wires keep riders from straying off course. Just prior to reaching the rapidly approaching ground, the machine slows the rider down, bringing them to a controlled landing.

== See also ==
- Big Shot
- Insanity
- High Roller
- X-Scream
