= Big Shot (ride) =

Amusement ride, opened 1996, on top of the Stratosphere Las Vegas tower

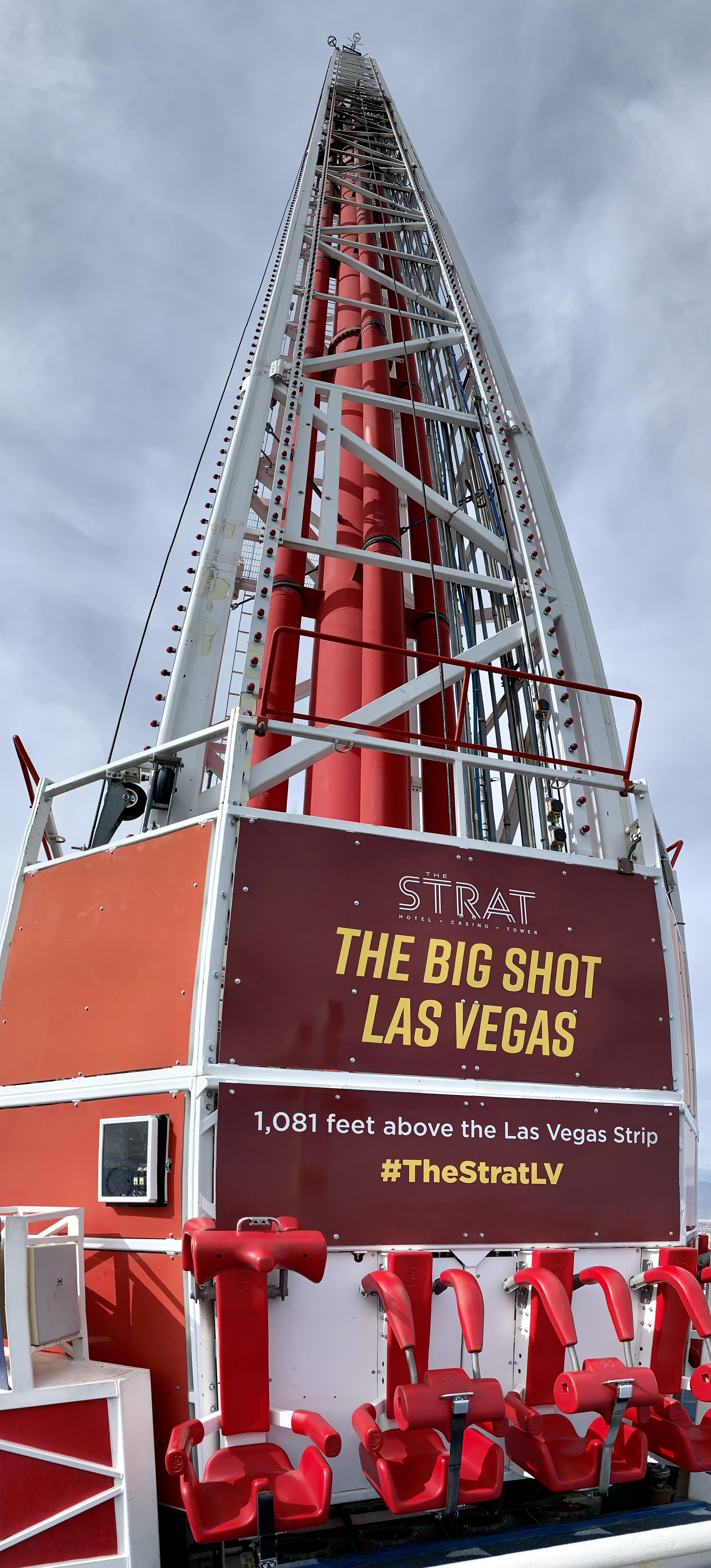
- The Big Shot in 2021

The Strat
- Coordinates: 36°8′50.59″N 115°9′19.40″W
- Status: Operating
- Opening date: April 29, 1996

Ride statistics
- Attraction type: Space Shot
- Manufacturer: S&S Worldwide
- Designer: Stan Checketts
- Model: Space Shot
- Height: 160 ft (49 m)
- Speed: 45 mph (72 km/h)
- G-force: 4
- Duration: 0:35
- Height restriction: 48 in (122 cm)

Big Shot (Formerly known as Space Shot) is a pneumatically powered tower ride. It was the world's highest amusement ride in terms of overall elevation above ground level, but has since been surpassed by the Sky Drop ride atop the Canton Tower in Guangzhou. The 160 feet (49 m) tower is built atop the 921 feet (281 m) high deck of The Strat in Las Vegas, Nevada. It remains the world's second highest thrill ride as of 2025.

== History ==
The ride opened on April 29, 1996, in a special VIP gala opening, one day before the ride and casino opened to the general public. While it may not have been the first Space Shot to open in the United States, this one does appear to be the first one built. Big Shot was one of the first two amusement rides to open on the Stratosphere tower at the casino opening (the other being High Roller). Even initially, Stratosphere guests exhibited considerably greater excitement over the Big Shot gravity drop tower than they did over High Roller.

== Ride experience ==
Big Shot is a pneumatically powered tower ride, featuring a rapid ascent from an elevation of 921 ft (281 m) to 1,081 ft (329 m). The ride accelerates to 45 miles per hour (72 km/h). The ride generates 4Gs during the rapid ascent.

== See also ==
- High Roller
- Insanity
- SkyJump Las Vegas
- X-Scream
