= X-Scream =

Roller Coaster in Las Vegas

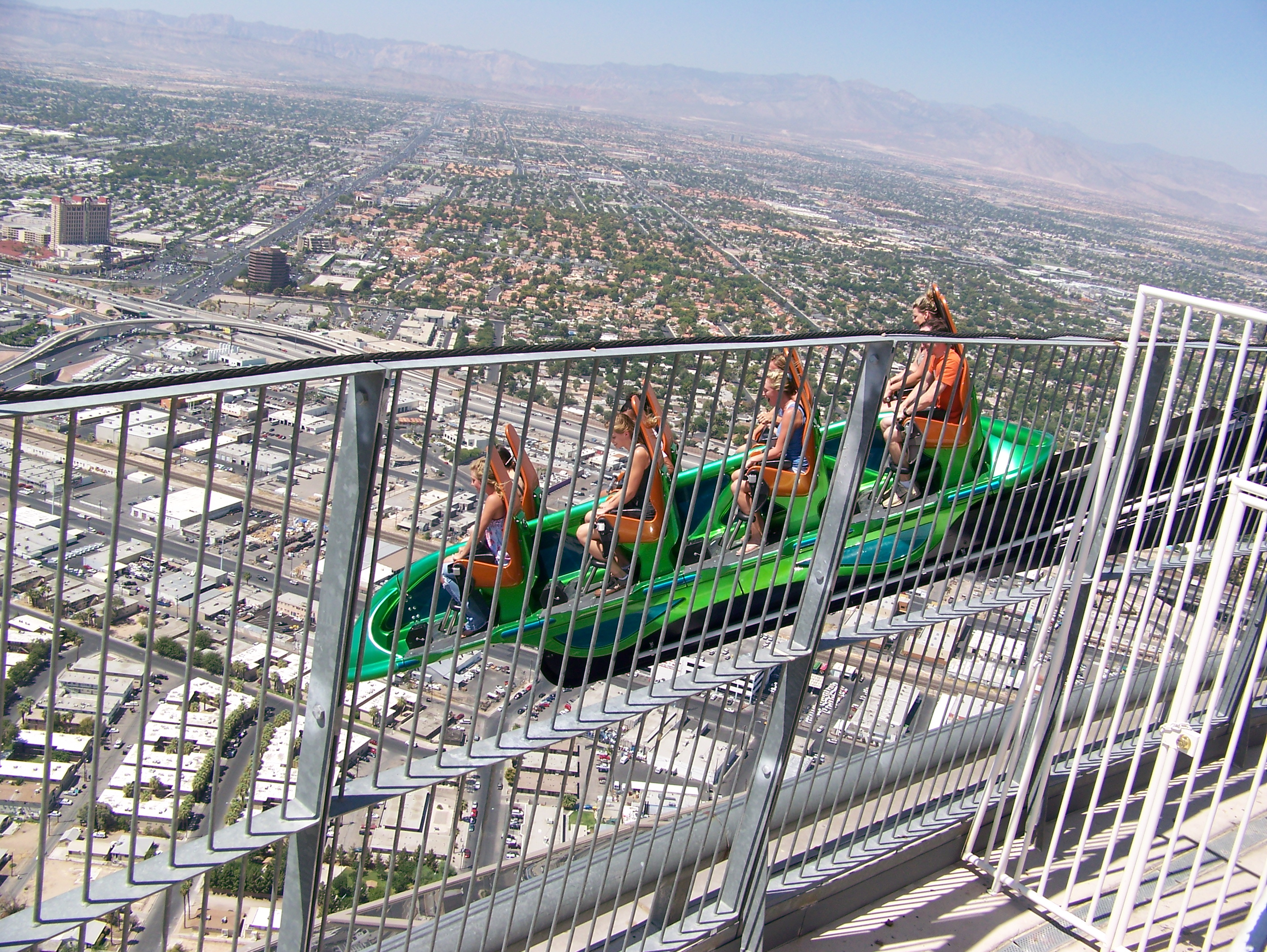

The Strat
- Coordinates: 36°08′51″N 115°09′19″W
- Status: Operating
- Opening date: October 31, 2003

Ride statistics
- Attraction type: Thrill ride
- Manufacturer: Interactive Rides Inc.
- Model: Project X Sky
- Height: 866 ft (264 m)
- Speed: 30 mph (48 km/h)
- Capacity: 360 riders per hour
- Vehicles: 1
- Riders per vehicle: 8
- Height restriction: 52 in (132 cm)

X-Scream is a ride at the top of the Strat SkyPod in Las Vegas, Nevada. At a height of approximately 866 feet (264 m), the world's third highest amusement ride, located on top of The Strat. The name of the ride is a play on the word extreme.

== Ride experience ==
X-Scream consists of a 68 ft (21 m) straight piece of track similar to that of a conventional roller coaster, which carries a single open-top car. Riders are secured by lap bar restraints. The trackway pivots vertically in a see-saw motion, letting the car roll backward and forward along the length. The ride car is allowed to roll quickly forward to the end of the track, 27 feet (8.2 m) past the edge of the building, before braking sharply. The rolling back and forth of the car and the rocking of the track is programmed to take the rider by surprise and feel like they are at risk of falling from the precipice of the building.

== See also ==
- Big Shot
- Insanity
- High Roller
- SkyJump Las Vegas
