= Insanity (ride) =

Roller Coaster in Las Vegas

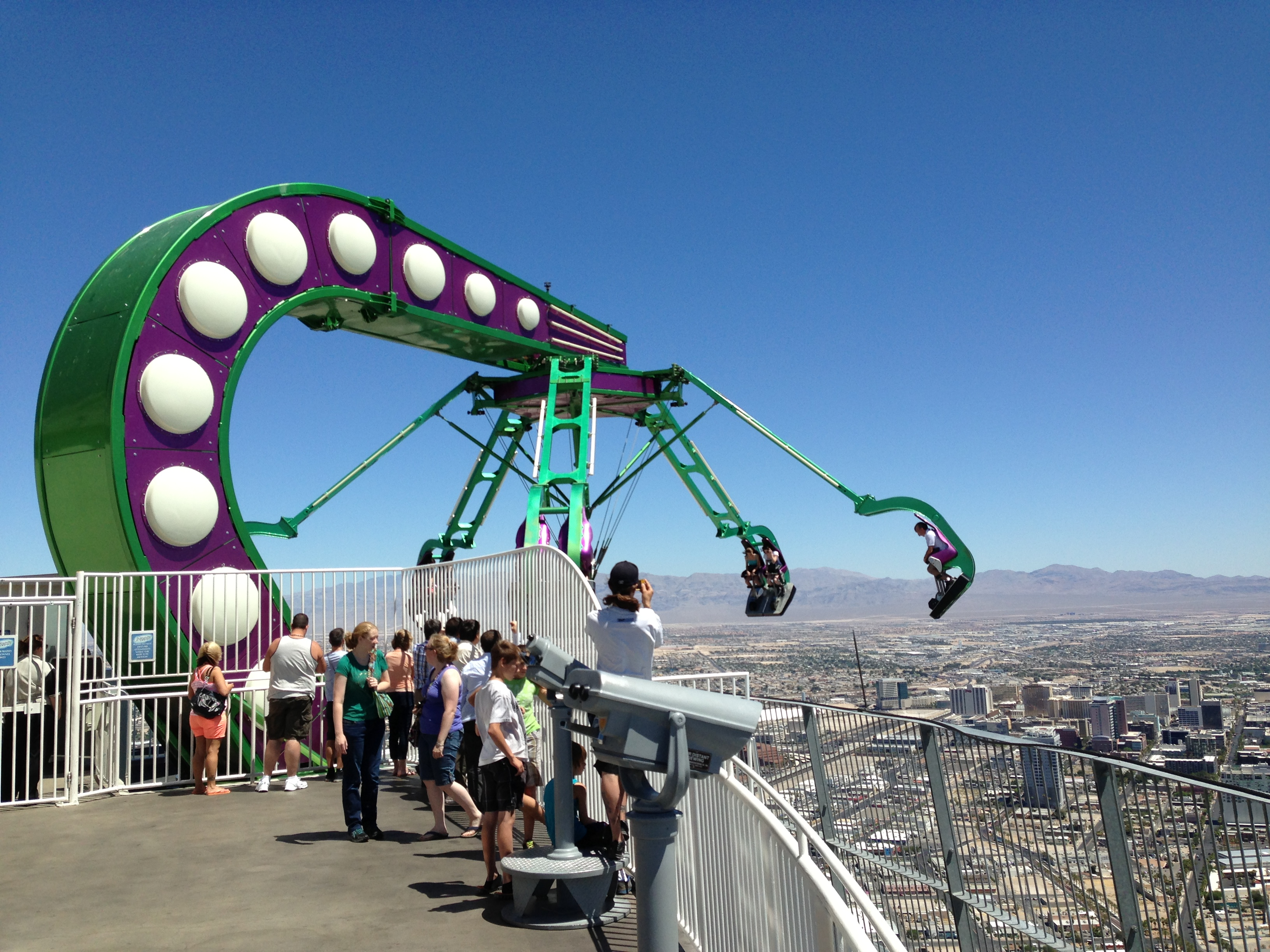

The Strat
- Coordinates: 36°08′52″N 115°09′19″W
- Status: Closed

Ride statistics
- Attraction type: Thrill ride
- Manufacturer: Interactive Rides
- Height: 900 ft (270 m)
- Speed: 40 mph (64 km/h)
- G-force: 3
- Vehicles: 1
- Riders per vehicle: 10
- Height restriction: 52 in (132 cm)

Insanity is an inactive thrill ride located 900 ft (270m) above ground at the top of The Strat in Las Vegas, Nevada that opened in 2005. As of March 2023, Insanity is closed until further notice, and has been removed from the list of thrill rides at the resort.

== Ride experience ==
Riders are seated under a large mechanical arm, secured by lap bar restraints. The arm dangles the seats over the edge of the tower, tilts them 70 degrees facing down, and spins them at 40 mph.

== 2005 incident ==
Shortly after opening in 2005, riders were stranded several hundred feet in the air for nearly an hour and a half when Insanity shut down; it was programmed to cease operation if a fault or problem was detected by the ride's control system. Strong winds caused the system to trigger the emergency stop.

== See also ==
- Big Shot
- X-Scream
- High Roller
- SkyJump Las Vegas
