= Space Shot (ride) =

Type of drop tower amusement ride

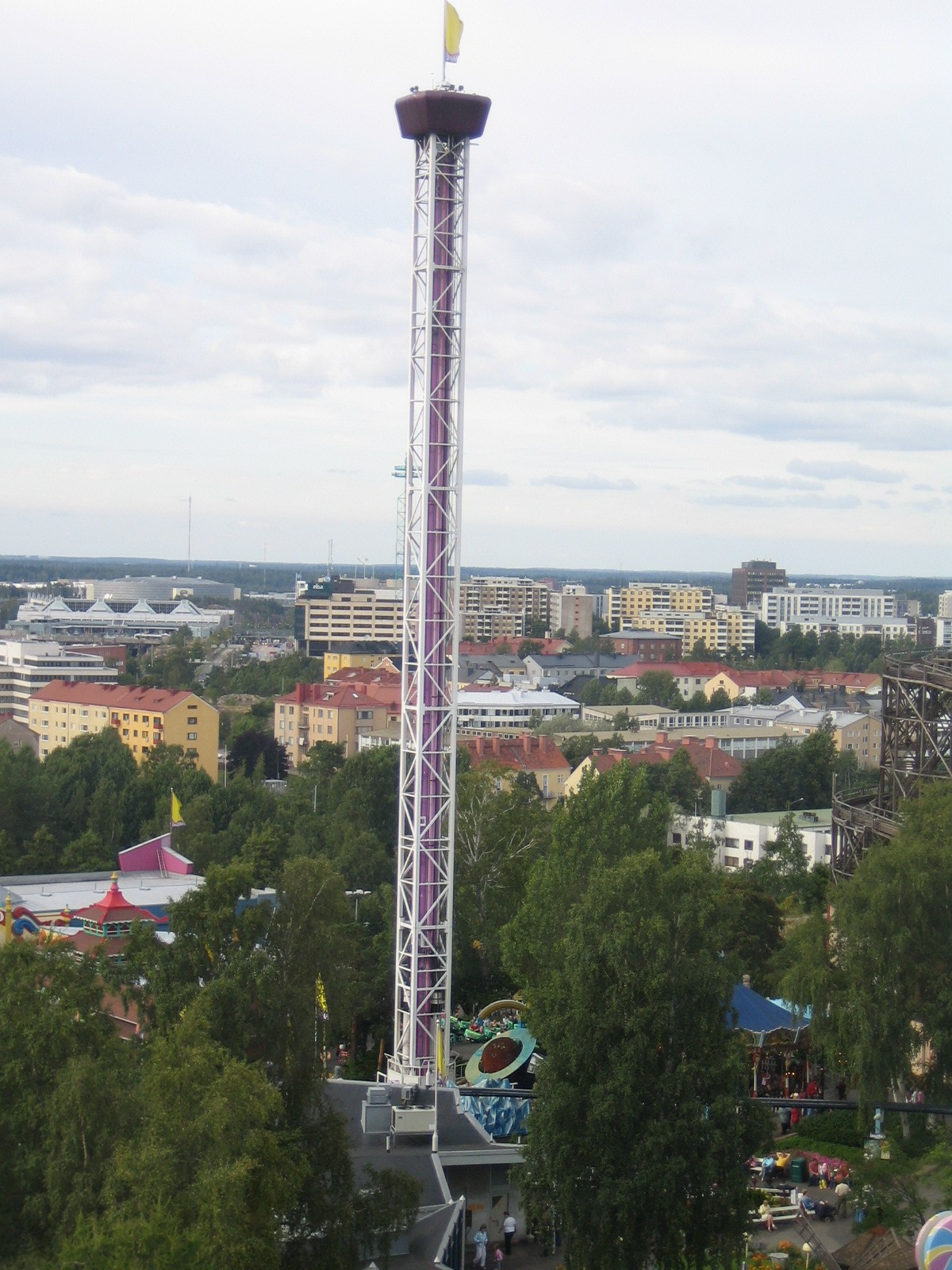
- Raketti (formerly known as Space Shot) in Linnanmäki amusement park in Finland
- Status: In production
- First manufactured: 1994–present

Space Shot is a type of amusement ride manufactured by S&S - Sansei Technologies.

The ride is a drop tower type attraction that uses compressed air to rapidly propel riders up the tower then gently lower them with a series of air-cushioned bounces back to the loading platform.

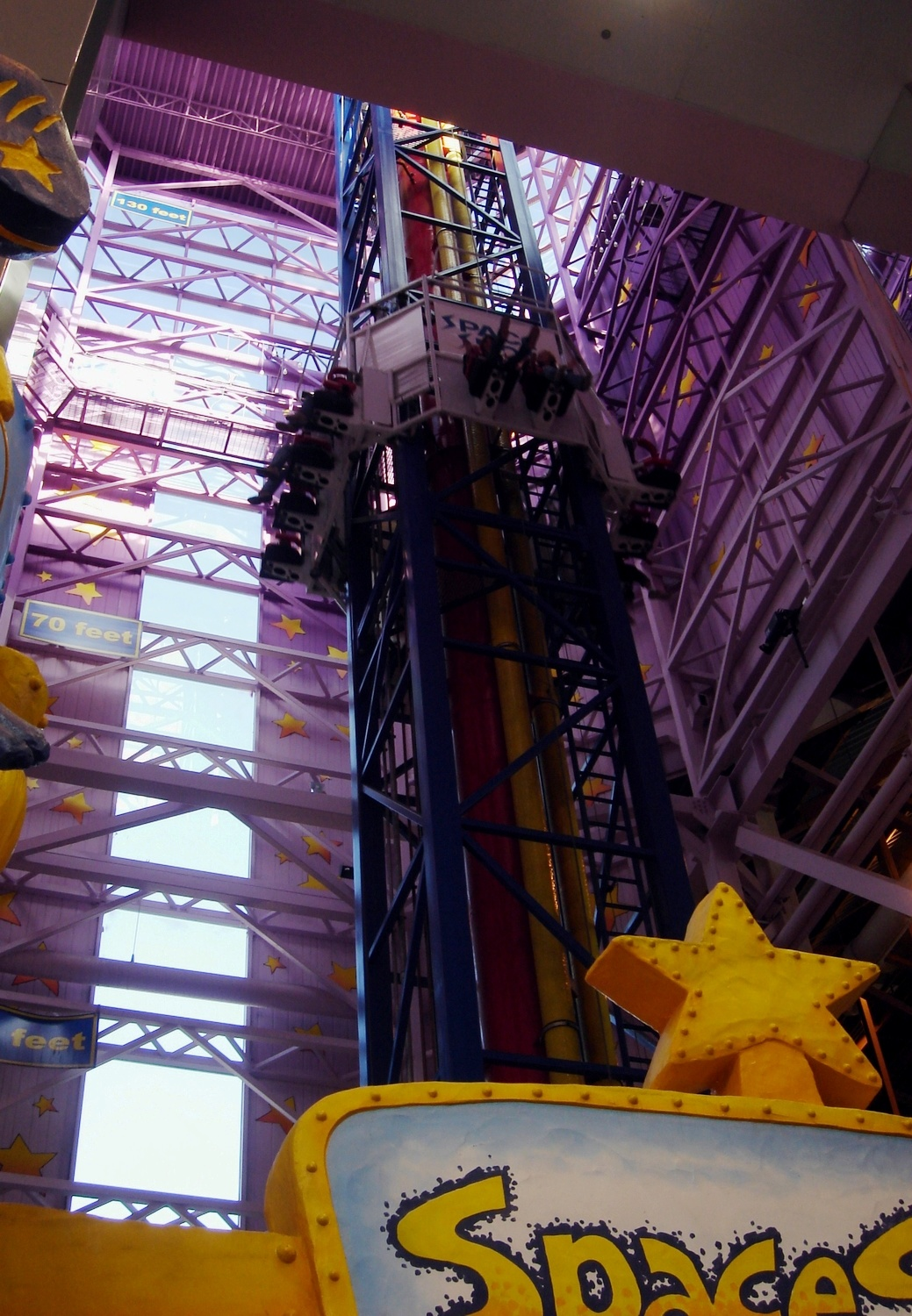
The Space Shot at Galaxyland in Edmonton, Alberta, Canada was the tallest indoor tower ride in the world at 120 feet (37 m) until Nickelodeon Skyline Scream opened on October 25, 2019, at American Dream.

== Statistics ==
Space Shot has the following stats:

- Ride Speed: 60 miles per hour (98 kilometers per hour)
- Capacity: 12 or 16 per tower, depending on seating configuration
- Altogether passenger minimum weight: 222 pounds
- Total passenger maximum weight: 2,500 pounds (1090 kilograms)
- Total passenger minimum height: 48 inches (1.22 meters)
- Ride duration: 50 seconds
- Height: Varies from 90 feet (28 meters) to over 300 feet (92 meters)
- Footprint: 7 feet 6 inches for 12 seats (2.28 meters), 10 feet (3 meters) for 16 seat configuration
- Weight (empty): 120,000 pounds (52,320 kilogram)

== Ride mechanism ==
Ride movement

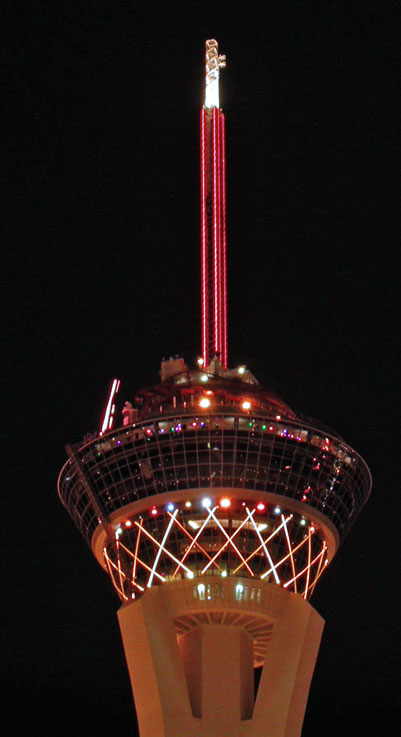
Red track of Big Shot atop Stratosphere Las Vegas

The mechanism consists of a central tower around which rows of seats are placed with the riders facing outward away from the tower. In the center of the tower is a large columnar pipe system. Threaded through the main pipe column is a cable that is attached to a piston on one end, looped over a pulley at the top of the tower and attached to the seat carriage on the other.

In the loading position, the seat carriage is at the base of the tower and the piston is at the top of the pipe column. Once the ride has been loaded, the seats are lifted slightly off the ground and loaded seats are weighed in order to calculate the air pressure needed to safely propel the seats up the tower. Upon charging the air system to the correct pressure, compressed air is injected into the central column pushing the piston rapidly downward. As the piston moves down, it pulls the cable downward over the pulley at the top, propelling the seat carriage up the outside of the tower.

Upon exhausting the air from the pressure system, the carriage descends, drawing the piston back up the pipe column. As the piston moves up, the air inside the pipe column alternately compresses and expands, causing the carriage to bounce several times. With each bounce, a pressure relief valve at the top of the pipe column releases some of the compressed air making each successive bounce smaller until the carriage reaches the loading platform.

Visual representation of the ride cycle

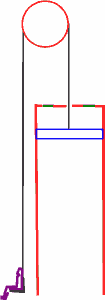
Carriage and piston at load positions

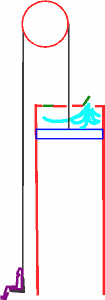
Injection of air into column

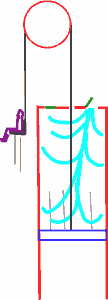
Piston descends, pulling carriage up

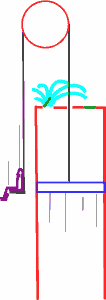
Carriage descends, pulling piston up and releasing air from top of column

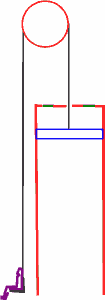
Carriage and piston return to load positions

== Double Shot ==
Double Shot is a type of amusement ride manufactured by S&S – Sansei Technologies.

The ride is a drop tower type attraction that uses compressed air to rapidly propel riders up the tower then gently lower them with a series of air-cushioned bounces back to the loading platform.

The ride is very similar to the Space Shot ride, also manufactured by S&S, but the Double Shot features an extra "shot" while riders are falling down after the first one.

=== Statistics ===
- Ride Speed: 30–35 miles per hour (50-55 kilometers per hour)
- Capacity: 12-16 per tower
- Ride duration: 40 seconds
- Height: Varies from 80 feet to over 125 feet

=== Locations ===
==== Standard 85 ft Rides ====
- Canobie Lake Park, Salem, New Hampshire, US
- Keansburg Amusement Park, Keansburg, New Jersey, US
- Playland, Rye, New York, US
- Playland's Castaway Cove, Ocean City, New Jersey, US
- Wild Adventures, Valdosta, Georgia, US
- Silver Dollar City, Branson, Missouri, US
- Navy Pier, Chicago, Illinois, US (relocated from Pleasure Island Family Theme Park in the UK)

==== Other rides ====
- Extreme Scream, located at Washington State Fair, Puyallup, Washington, US
- Double Shot, 125 ft, located at Santa Cruz Beach Boardwalk, Santa Cruz, California, US
- Shore Shot, 125 ft, located at Casino Pier, Seaside Heights, New Jersey, US
- Brain Drain - relocated at Wild Waves and Enchanted Village, Federal Way, Washington, US
- Dragons Tower - located at Castle Park, Riverside, California, US
- Liberty Launch - located at Holiday World, Santa Claus, Indiana, US,
- Tårngyset - located at Bakken, Denmark
- Free Fall - located at Showcenter Haedo, Buenos Aires, Argentina (defunct)
- Space Shot (2) - Approx 120 ft, located at Galaxyland, West Edmonton Mall, Edmonton, Alberta, Canada
- Starblaster - located at Canobie Lake Park, Salem, New Hampshire, US
- Pemburu Badai, 125 ft, located at Trans Studio Bandung, Bandung, West Java, Indonesia
- Dare 2 Drop, 131 ft, located at Imagicaa, Khopoli, India
- Hershey Triple Tower, located at Hersheypark, Hershey, Pennsylvania, US

== Turbo Drop ==
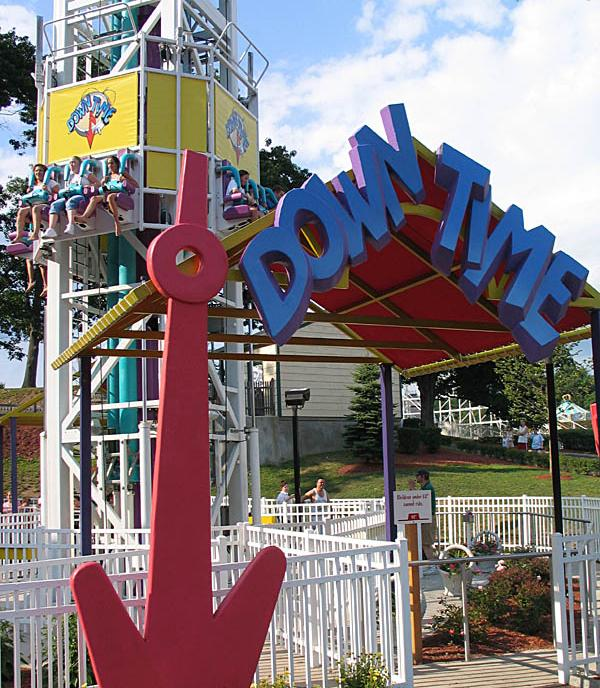
Down Time, a Turbo Drop operating at Lake Compounce

Turbo Drop is a model of tower-based amusement ride manufactured by S&S - Sansei Technologies, similar to the company's Space Shot.

== Design and operation ==
The ride is a vertical drop tower. It uses compressed air to slowly lift a 12-16 seat car to the top of the tower, at an approximate and average speed of 12 miles per hour (19 km/h). The car is held for multiple seconds, before it is launched downwards with a force of 1.5G, dropping almost to the ground. The compressed air 'bounces' the car back to halfway, before it is lowered to the loading dock. As the tower is four-sided, up to sixteen passengers can ride simultaneously.

== Appearances ==
- The Abyss Turbo Drop at Ocean Park in Hong Kong
- Dominator at Dorney Park & Wildwater Kingdom in Allentown, Pennsylvania, US
- Discovery at Mirabilandia in Savio di Ravenna, Italy
- Down Time at Lake Compounce in Bristol, Connecticut, US
- Dragon's Descent at Funtown Splashtown USA In Saco, Maine, US
- Det Gyldne Tårn at Tivoli Gardens in Copenhagen, Denmark
- Hellevator at Playland in Vancouver, Canada
- Höjdskräcken at Liseberg in Gothenburg, Sweden
- Hysteria at Dunia Fantasi in Jakarta, Indonesia
- Kilahuea at Six Flags Mexico in Mexico City, Mexico
- Power Tower at Cedar Point in Sandusky, Ohio, US
- Power Tower at Valleyfair in Shakopee, Minnesota, US
- The Rocket at Lagoon Amusement Park in Farmington, Utah, US
- Sasquatch at Six Flags Great Escape and Hurricane Harbor in Queensbury, New York, US
- Scream! at Six Flags New England in Agawam, Massachusetts, US
- Scream! at Six Flags Fiesta Texas in San Antonio, Texas, US
- Skyborne at Lost Island Theme Park in Waterloo, Iowa, US
- Superman: Tower of Power at Six Flags Over Texas in Arlington, Texas, US
- Supreme Scream at Knott's Berry Farm in Buena Park, California, US
- Turbo Drop at Buffalo Bill's Hotel and Casino in Primm, Nevada, US
