= High Roller (Stratosphere) =

Defunct steel rollercoaster at Stratosphere Tower, Las Vegas

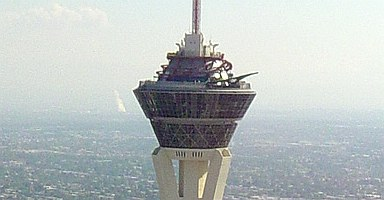
- The High Roller at the top of Stratosphere Las Vegas

Stratosphere Tower
- Location: Stratosphere Tower
- Coordinates: 36°8′50.59″N 115°9′19.40″W
- Status: Removed
- Opening date: April 29, 1996
- Closing date: December 30, 2005
- Cost: $900,000

General statistics
- Type: Steel
- Manufacturer: S&MC
- Designer: Premier Rides
- Model: Family Coaster
- Track layout: Helix
- Lift/launch system: Tires
- Drop: 20 ft (6.1 m)
- Length: 865 ft (264 m)
- Speed: 30 mph (48 km/h)
- Inversions: 0
- Duration: 0:40
- Max vertical angle: 13°
- Capacity: 700 riders per hour
- Acceleration: 5 mrsn
- G-force: 2
- Height restriction: 48 in (122 cm)
- Trains: Single train with 7 cars; riders arranged 2 across in 2 rows for a total of 28 riders per train
- High Roller at RCDB

The High Roller (also known as the Let it Ride High Roller) was a steel roller coaster constructed 1,070 feet (330 m) over the Las Vegas Strip. It was the highest roller coaster in the world when compared to the surrounding terrain. It was located on top of the Stratosphere Tower, Las Vegas, Nevada, which is the tallest free-standing observation tower in the United States. The coaster was manufactured by S&MC GmbH Structures and Machines.

== History ==
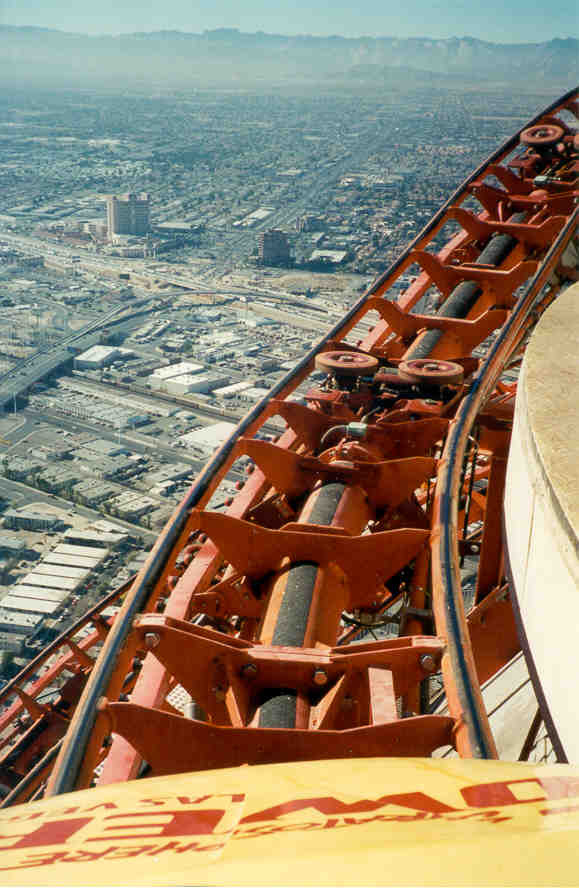
View of Las Vegas from the High Roller

The ride opened on April 29, 1996, in a special VIP gala opening, one day before the ride and casino opened to the general public. High Roller was one of the first two amusement rides to open on the Stratosphere tower at the casino opening (the other being Big Shot). Even initially, Stratosphere guests exhibited considerably greater excitement over the Big Shot gravity drop tower than they did over High Roller.

As with the other rides at the Stratosphere Las Vegas, admission to the High Roller was typically charged per ride, as opposed to a single pass that allowed for unlimited rides as is typically the case in most United States amusement parks. The cost to ride the High Roller was $5 per rider in 2001 (barring residency and other discounts). This price was later lowered to $4.

=== Closure and removal ===
High Roller was closed on December 30, 2005, and dismantled. The ride was in need of refurbishing that would cost over $500,000 and was the least popular of the Stratosphere rides, leading to the decision to remove it. It was initially estimated that removal of the ride would take three months and be accomplished largely by crane, but the use of plasma cutting, as opposed to gas cutting, sped the removal of the coaster (the lack of need to transport flammable acetylene canisters for gas cutting also improved safety). The 300 lb (140 kg) track segments were also removed by elevator as opposed to being removed by crane.

== Ride experience ==
The High Roller sat high on top of the tower's observation pod and its track wound around the central mast. Due to these design limitations, the High Roller was neither a fast nor intense ride experience; the height alone was the primary thrill element. The height of the ride itself from base to top was quite modest, only having a drop of 20 feet (6.1 m). Some writers described the ride as being bumpy while the coaster banks sharply around the tower. While it seemed to riders that there was nothing between the track and the Las Vegas Strip below, a platform was present underneath the ride.

The ride garnered generally poor reviews from its riders. For example, it was ranked as the 8th most overrated roller coaster by About.com's Arthur Levine, who criticized High Roller for its low speed and acceleration, as well as its lack of drops and inversions. Aggregated reviews on themeparkcritic.com gave the ride an average of 2.77 out of 5.0, compared to Stratosphere's other rides—Big Shot, X-Scream and Insanity—which all garnered ratings above 4.0 out of 5.0.

Although there were never any serious incidents or injuries on the High Roller, the ride was well known for its frequent break-downs, and all the rides on Stratosphere would frequently shut down temporarily due to high winds (greater than 45 mph). Notable incidents early in High Roller's operation included a drive cylinder breaking loose and cracking safety glass in an observation level below, and an incident where two wheels came loose—derailing the train and forcing riders to be rescued. One major break-down in 1996 necessitated in High Roller being re-engineered.

== See also ==
- SkyJump Las Vegas
- Big Shot
- Insanity
- X-Scream
