= Superman: Tower of Power =

Drop tower at Six Flags parks

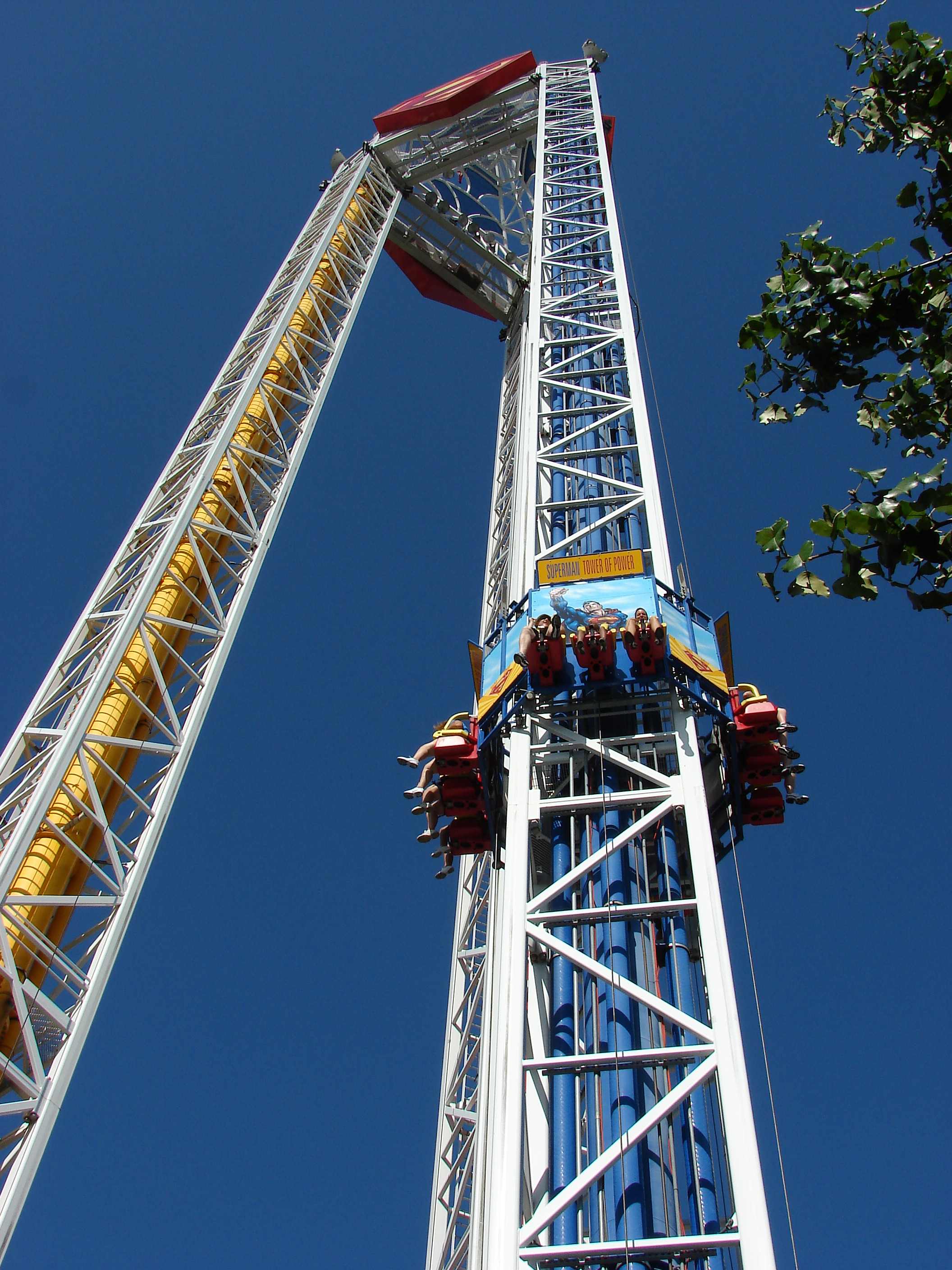
- Superman: Tower of Power ride at Six Flags Over Texas in 2010

Six Flags St. Louis
- Area: Illinois
- Status: Removed
- Opening date: May 19, 2006
- Closing date: 2020
- Replaced by: Catwoman Whip

Six Flags Over Texas
- Area: Tower
- Status: Operating
- Opening date: March 29, 2003

Six Flags Over Georgia
- Area: DC Super Friends
- Status: Operating
- Opening date: May 27, 2016

Six Flags Kentucky Kingdom
- Status: Removed
- Opening date: October 13, 1995
- Closing date: June 21, 2007

Ride statistics
- Attraction type: Drop tower
- Theme: Superman
- Manufacturer: Intamin (Kentucky Kingdom and Six Flags St. Louis); S&S Worldwide (Six Flags Over Texas); Zamperla (Six Flags Over Georgia)
- Fast Lane available
- Must transfer from wheelchair

Superman: Tower of Power is a drop tower ride located at Six Flags Over Georgia and Six Flags Over Texas. S&S Worldwide (S&S) manufactured the installment at Six Flags Over Texas, which opened on March 29, 2003, while the version at Six Flags Over Georgia was built by Zamperla, and opened on May 27, 2016. Additional drop towers of the same model by S&S have been installed at other Six Flags parks.

Intamin built the earliest installment at Kentucky Kingdom in 1995, followed by a second one at Six Flags AstroWorld in 1997, which was moved to Mid America Adventure (then known as Six Flags St. Louis) in 2006 following the closure of Six Flags AstroWorld. Both installations have since been removed. At Kentucky Kingdom (known as Six Flags Kentucky Kingdom at the time), the feet of a 13-year-old rider were severed in an accident in 2007, resulting in the removal of the ride at the park. At Six Flags St. Louis, the ride operated through the 2020 season.

== Six Flags Kentucky Kingdom ==
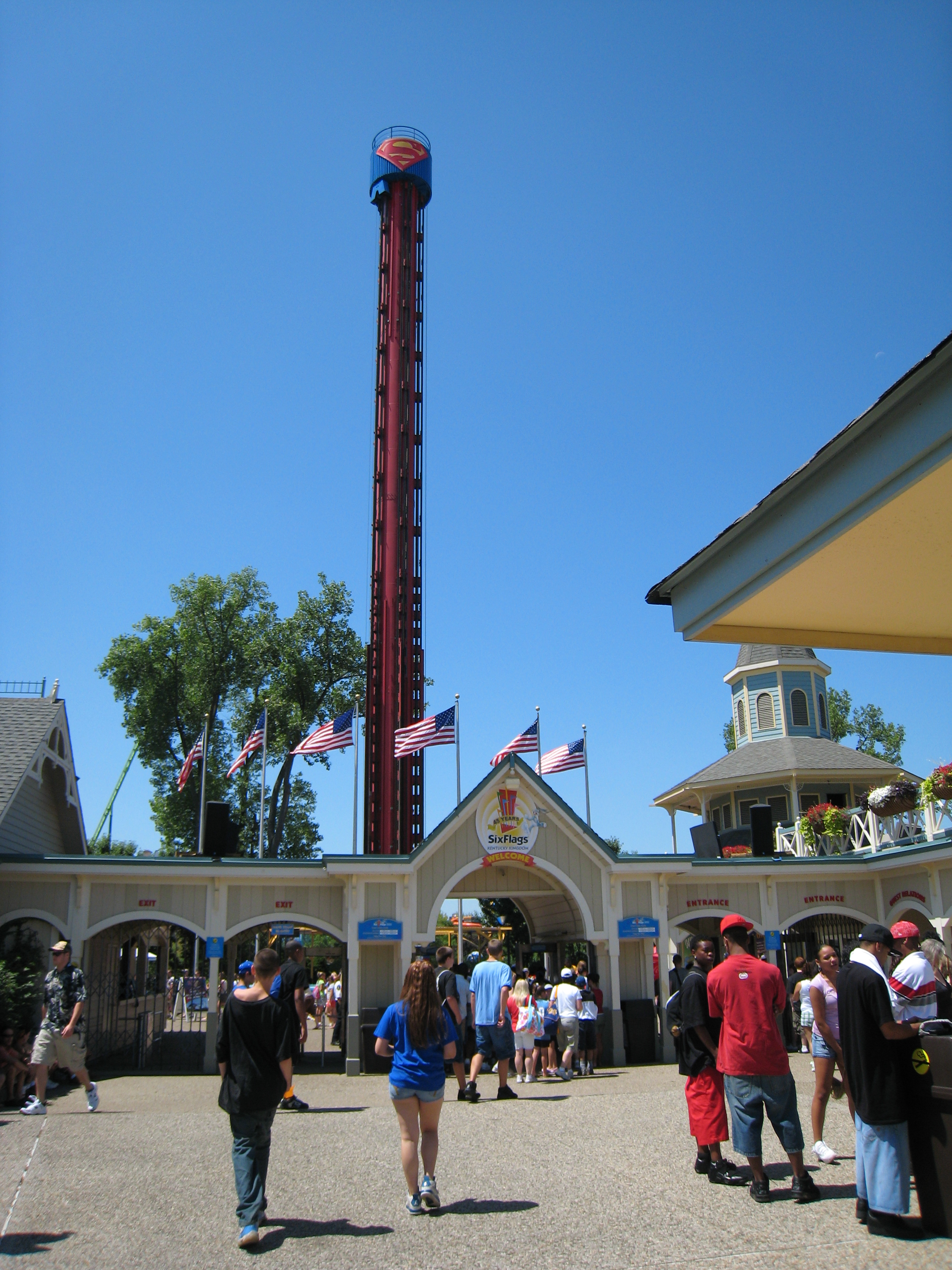
Superman Tower of Power at Kentucky Kingdom on June 9, 2007

Superman: Tower of Power at Kentucky Kingdom (known later as Six Flags Kentucky Kingdom) in Louisville, Kentucky, was an Intamin Giant Drop model. It opened in 1995 as the first ride of its kind, and was originally named Hellevator. The ride was constructed by Martin & Vleminckx. It was rethemed to Superman: Tower of Power in 2007, and received a fresh coat of paint at the top of the ride. The same year it was refurbished, its life was cut short after a major accident took place. The ride was dismantled in 2008.

=== Rider experience ===
Riders sit in one of four seats in several cars attached to the tower. They are quickly taken 177 feet (54 m) in the air at 12 mph (19 km/h), held at the top for several seconds, and then dropped around 154 feet (47 m) at speeds of 54 mph (87 km/h), before being stopped 23 feet (7.0 m) from the ground by magnetic brakes.

=== Statistics ===
- Opened: October 13, 1995 (as Hellevator)
- Closed: June 21, 2007
- Height: 177 feet (54 m)
- Drop height: 154 feet (47 m)
- Maximum speed: 54 mph (87 km/h)
- Lift speed: 12 mph (19 km/h)
- Manufacturer: Intamin
- Height restriction: 48 in (122 cm)

=== Incidents ===
On June 21, 2007, 13-year-old Kaitlyn Lassiter was severely injured on Superman: Tower of Power when a cable snapped shortly after the ride began, striking the passengers in Section 3 of the ride, where she was located. The cable wrapped around Lassiter's feet during the drop, shattering her left femur and severing both of her feet. Ride operators heard the cable snap and acknowledged unusual screaming as the car climbed, but failed to press the emergency stop button until after the ride had already dropped. The ride cannot be stopped once the carriage begins to drop. Surgeons later successfully reattached her right foot, but her left foot required amputation below the knee.

Following the accident, the ride was closed indefinitely. Around the country, other drop tower rides of a similar make temporarily closed for inspection, including Drop Tower rides at five Cedar Fair parks. On November 29, 2007, Six Flags Kentucky Kingdom announced that Superman: Tower of Power would be demolished. The attraction was removed prior to the 2008 season.

On May 14, 2008, the Lassiter family spoke publicly and gave support for a bill introduced by Massachusetts State Representative Ed Markey, which would have allowed the federal government to oversee permanent rides at amusement parks. The family sued Six Flags and reached a confidential settlement on November 21, 2008, with one of the terms requiring Six Flags to provide a lifetime of care for the injured girl.

== Six Flags Over Georgia ==
Superman: Tower of Power at Six Flags Over Georgia in Mableton, Georgia is located in the DC Super Friends themed area.

=== Statistics ===
- Opened: May 27, 2016
- Height: 65 ft (20 m)
- Manufacturer: Zamperla
- Height restriction: 42 in (107 cm)

== Six Flags Over Texas ==
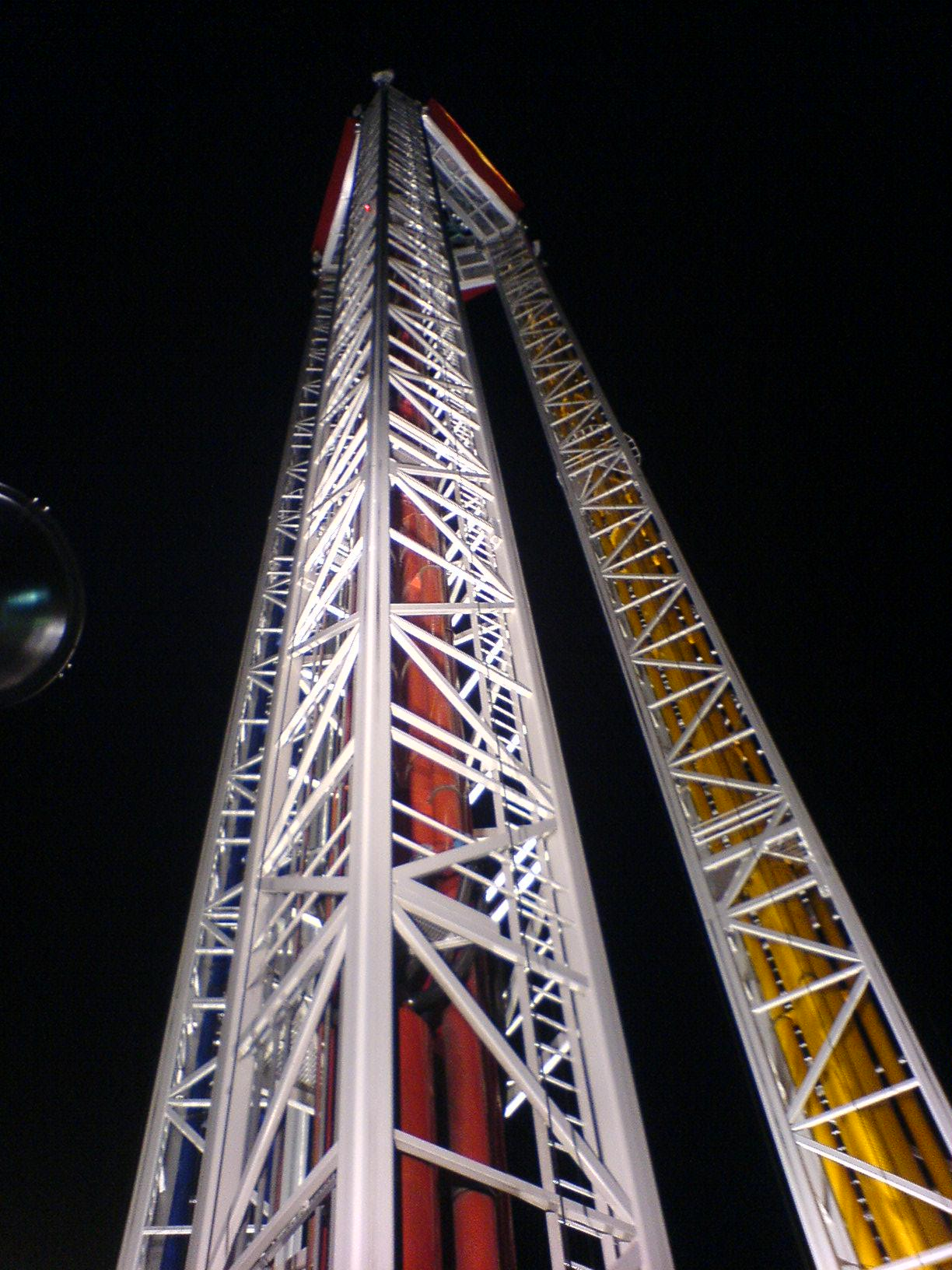
Superman: Tower of Power at Six Flags Over Texas illuminated at night

Superman: Tower of Power at Six Flags Over Texas in Arlington, Texas was added to the Tower section of the park in 2003. With a structural height of 325 feet (99 m), it was the tallest ride in the park until the opening of Texas Sky Screamer. Superman: Tower of Power is also the tallest ride to use both space shot and turbo drop pneumatic (air powered) sequences in the United States, as well as the second tallest of its kind in the world (the tallest being La Venganza Del Enigma at Parque Warner Madrid with a height of 377 feet (115 m)).

It features three towers: blue, red, and yellow. Riders sit facing outward and are strapped using air-locked shoulder restraints and a safety belt that attaches the restraint to the seat. The ride begins with the weigh process. During this time the cart is raised and lowered as the ride's computer determines the amount of air pressure to use for the ride cycle. Once completed, there is a brief pause before riders are launched up the tower (Space Shot), and slow just before reaching the top. The vehicle falls halfway down the tower, and is brought back up to the top to complete the Turbo Drop portion of the ride. Once at the top, the car locks into the brakes and is held for several seconds. It is then released from the brakes, and riders are dropped again. The riders are then bounced halfway up the tower and dropped for a final time, until they are slowly brought back down to be unloaded.

=== Statistics ===
- Opened: March 29, 2003
- Total height: 325 feet (99 m)
- Structural height: 313 feet (95 m)
- Drop height: 245 feet (74 m)
- Maximum speed: 55 mph (89 km/h)
- G-force: -1.0 g, +4.0 g
- Manufacturer: S&S Worldwide
- Height restriction: 52 in (132 cm)

== Six Flags St. Louis ==
Superman: Tower of Power at Six Flags St. Louis (now Mid America Adventure) was manufactured by Intamin, and was one of Intamin's Giant Drop models. Riders sat in open-air ski lift style seats that faced away from the tower. Once a ride cycle began, the car quickly accelerated to 12 mph (19 km/h) as it climbed to the top of the tower. Riders were held at the top for several seconds. The cars were then released in a random order and free-fell before being stopped by the brakes and lowered to the ground slowly for unloading.

The ride originally operated at Six Flags AstroWorld in Houston, Texas, where it was known as Dungeon Drop. When AstroWorld closed in 2005, Dungeon Drop was relocated to Six Flags St. Louis. The ride was closed for several days as a precaution following the incident which occurred on the Six Flags Kentucky Kingdom installation in 2007.

=== Stats ===
- Opened: May 19, 2006
- Closed: 2020
- Height: 227 ft (69 m)
- Drop height: 217 ft (66 m)
- Maximum speed: 65 mph (104.607 km/h)
- Manufacturer: Intamin
- Height restriction: 48 in (122 cm)
